= Tina =

Tina may refer to:

== People ==
- Tina (given name), including a list of people and fictional characters with the name

== Places ==
- Tina, Iran, a village in Khuzestan Province, Iran
- Tina (Sudan), a town in North Darfur, Sudan
- Tina, Tunisia, a town in Sfax Governorate, Tunisia
- Tina, Guadalcanal, Solomon Islands
- Al-Tina, a Palestinian Arab village depopulated in 1948
- el-Tina railway station, see List of railway stations in Egypt
- El Tina Castle, see List of Egyptian castles, forts, fortifications and city walls
- Tina, a village in Livezi Commune, Vâlcea County, Romania

=== United States ===
- Tina, Missouri, a village in Carroll County
- Tina, Kentucky, an unincorporated community
- Tina, West Virginia, a former settlement

== Acronyms ==
- There is no alternative, a political slogan of Margaret Thatcher
- This Is Not Art, Newcastle event
- Truth in Advertising (organization), also called TINA.org or truthinadvertising.org
- Truth in Negotiations Act, a 1962 US law
- Twisted intercalating nucleic acid

== Music ==
- Tina!, a 2008 compilation album by Tina Turner
- T.I.N.A. (album), a 2014 album by British-Ghanaian singer-rapper Fuse ODG
- Tina (musical), a 2018 jukebox musical

=== Songs ===
- "T.I.N.A." (song), by Fuse ODG, 2014
- "Tina" (song), by the Game and Kanye West, 2025
- "Tina", by Camper Van Beethoven from Telephone Free Landslide Victory, 1985
- "Tina", by The Mekons from Journey to the End of the Night, 2000
- "Tina", by Flyleaf, a bonus track on the Japanese release of Flyleaf, 2005
- "Tina", by Tyler, the Creator from the album Bastard, 2009
- "Tina", by Pulp from the album More, 2025

== Other uses ==
- Tina (plant), genus in the family Sapindaceae
- Tina (moth), genus of moths
- Tina, slang term for methamphetamine, sometimes used specifically for the smokable form
- Tina language, Sambalic language
- TINA (software), SPICE based electronics design and training software
- A name variant of Tinia, Etruscan god
- Tina (film), 2021 documentary about Tina Turner
- Tinā, 2024 New Zealand movie
- Tina (Yugoslav magazine), youth magazine in Yugoslavia
- Tina (German magazine), woman magazine in Germany
- Tina and Milo, the mascot of the 2026 Winter Olympics
- TINA, a tram manufactured by Stadler Rail

== See also ==
- The dictionary definition of Appendix:Variations of "tina" at Wiktionary
- Teena (disambiguation)
- Thina (disambiguation)
