= Taba =

Taba or TABA may refer to:

== Places ==
Egypt

- Taba, Egypt, a town in Egypt near the Gulf of Aqaba
  - Taba Border Crossing, a border crossing between Taba in Egypt and Eilat in Israel
  - Taba International Airport, an international airport serving Taba and the nearby area
  - Taba Summit, a series of negotiations between Israel and the Palestinian Authority held in Taba, Egypt in 2001

Rwanda

- Taba, Rwanda, a commune in Rwanda

Solomon Islands

- Taba, Solomon Islands, a village in Guadalcanal, Solomon Islands

== Others ==
Languages

- Taba language, an Austronesian language spoken in the northern Maluku Islands of Indonesia

Others

- The Taba Game, a game with Greek origins popular among Argentinian gauchos
- TABA – Transportes Aéreos Bandeirantes, a Brazilian airline from 1945 to 1950
- TABA – Transportes Aéreos da Bacia Amazônica, a Brazilian airline from 1976 to 1999
