= A. guttula =

A. guttula may refer to:

- Abacetus guttula, a ground beetle
- Anacrusis guttula, a moth found in Ecuador
