= Templemania millistriata =

Scientific classification
- Domain: Eukaryota
- Kingdom: Animalia
- Phylum: Arthropoda
- Class: Insecta
- Order: Lepidoptera
- Family: Tortricidae
- Genus: Templemania
- Species: T. millistriata

Binomial name
- Templemania millistriata (Walsingham, 1914)

Synonyms
- Tortrix millistriata Walsingham, 1914

Species of moth

Templemania millistriata is a species of moth of the family Tortricidae. It is found in Veracruz, Mexico.
