= Anacrusis thunberghiana =

Scientific classification
- Domain: Eukaryota
- Kingdom: Animalia
- Phylum: Arthropoda
- Class: Insecta
- Order: Lepidoptera
- Family: Tortricidae
- Genus: Anacrusis
- Species: A. thunberghiana

Binomial name
- Anacrusis thunberghiana (Stoll, 1782)

Synonyms
- thunberghiana Stoll, 1782

Species of moth

Anacrusis thunberghiana is a species of moth of the family Tortricidae. It is found in Suriname.
