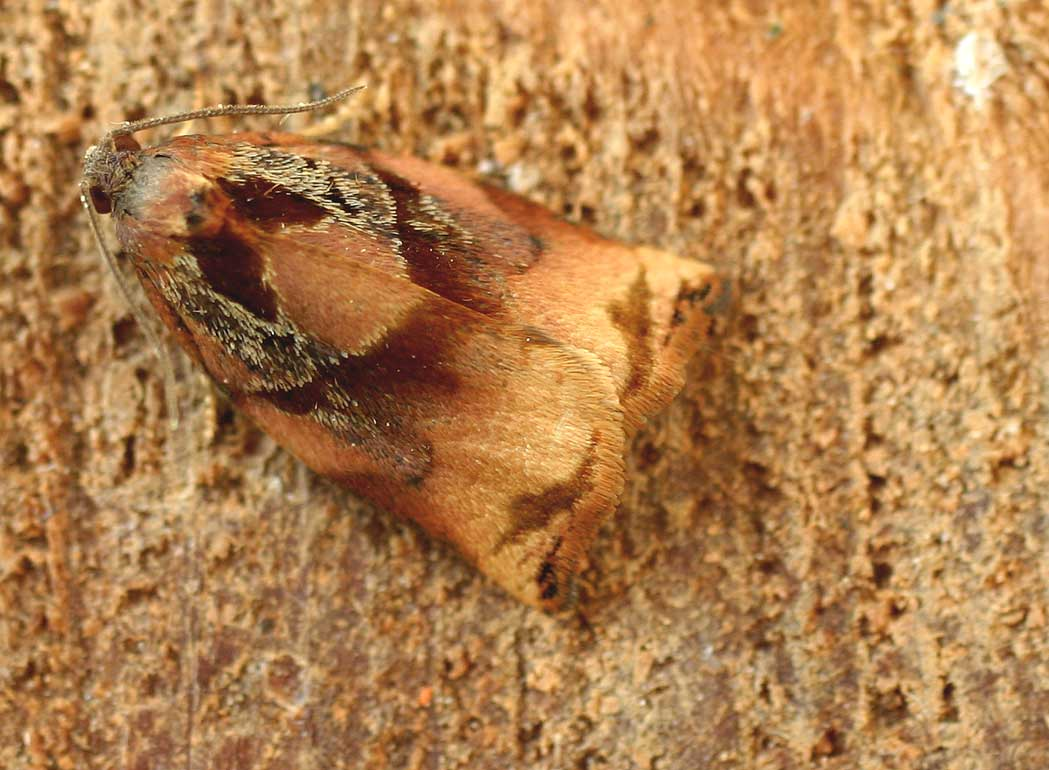

Scientific classification
- Kingdom: Animalia
- Phylum: Arthropoda
- Clade: Pancrustacea
- Class: Insecta
- Order: Lepidoptera
- Family: Tortricidae
- Subfamily: Tortricinae
- Tribe: Atteriini; Busck, 1932

= Atteriini =

Tribe of moths

The Atteriini are a tribe of tortrix moths.

== Genera ==
- Anacrusis
- Archipimima
- Atteria
- Holoptygma
- Sisurcana
- Templemania
- Tina
- Tinacrucis

== Unplaced species ==
- Capua ruficapilla Meyrick, 1932
