= 2014 Taba bus bombing =

Terrorist attack in Taba, Egypt on 16 February 2014

- Part of the Sinai insurgency
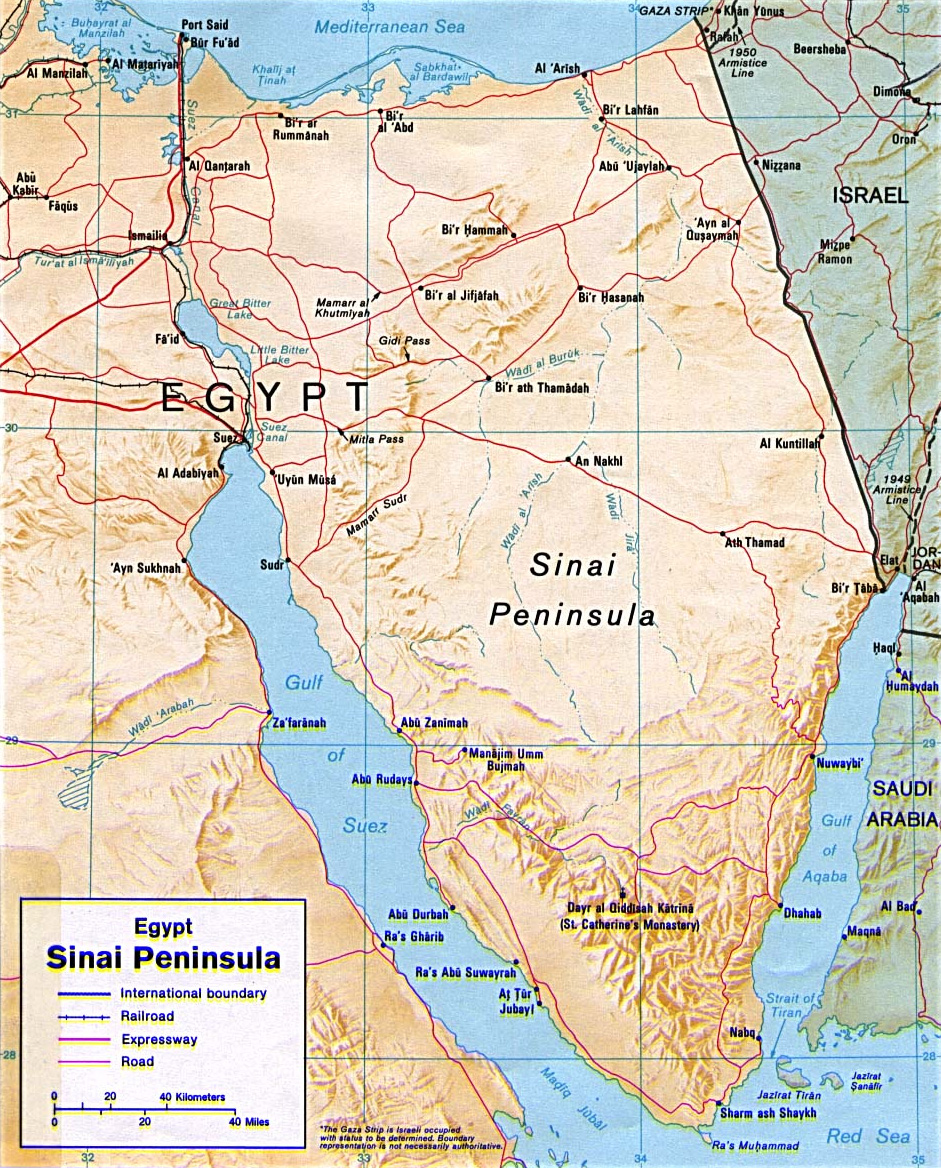
- Location: 29°29′35.35″N 34°53′47.46″E; Taba, Egypt
- Date: 16 February 2014
- Attack type: Suicide bombing
- Deaths: 4
- Injuries: 17
- Perpetrator: Islamic State of Iraq and the Levant – Sinai Province

A terrorist attack on a tourist coach in Taba, Egypt took place on 16 February 2014. The bus had been parked, waiting to cross into Israel at the Taba Border Crossing, when a lone suicide bomber entered the open bus and detonated his explosives. Four people – three South Koreans and the Egyptian bus driver were killed, and 17 others injured.

The attack was seen as marking a potential shift in the strategy of jihadist groups in the Sinai insurgency by broadening their campaign against Egyptian security forces to include tourists.

== Victims ==
The bomber detonated his device on a tour bus carrying more than 30 members of a South Korean church group. They had traveled from Cairo to Saint Catherine's Monastery in the Sinai Peninsula. The bus was waiting to cross into Israel when the explosion occurred. The South Korean tourists belonged to the Jincheon Jungang Presbyterian Church. They had reportedly "saved for years to visit Biblical sites on the 60th anniversary of their church".

== Responsibility ==
The day following the bombing, the Sinai-based jihadist group Ansar Bait al-Maqdis claimed responsibility for the attack in a statement released on jihadist forums. In the statement, Ansar declared, "One of the heroes of Ansar Beit al-Maqdis carried out the attack on a tourist bus heading towards the Zionist entity (Israel)." The group said the attack was "part of our economic war against this regime of traitors ... which kills the innocent, destroys houses, ransacks properties and lays waste to land on the border with the Zionist enemy".

On February 18, an affiliated Twitter account of Ansar told tourists to leave Egypt by February 20 or else they would be attacked.

Egyptian Islamist groups, including the Muslim Brotherhood, al-Gama'a al-Islamiyya and the National Alliance to Support Legitimacy, condemned the attack.

== Impact ==
Issandr El Amrani of the International Crisis Group said, "A continuation in attacks on tourists would mean a shift in strategy by jihadist groups that until now targeted the military and police... but that cannot be judged after one attack".

Following the attack, many tourist operators cancelled trips to the Sinai. The tourism industry is a key sector of the Egyptian economy.

== International response ==
European Union - EU High Representative Catherine Ashton condemned the “terrorist attack on a tourist bus in Sinai,” expressing solidarity with victims and supporting Egypt’s democratic transition.

United States - The U.S. State Department criticized what spokeswoman Jen Psaki called a “cowardly attack” targeting innocent tourists in Taba. The department offered condolences to the victims’ families.

United Kingdom - Foreign Office Minister Hugh Robertson issued a statement strongly condemning the bombing, extending the British government’s “deepest condolences” to the families of the victims.

France - A spokesperson for the French foreign ministry, Romain Nadal, said that France stood in solidarity with Egypt and Korea, condemned the attack, and reiterated support for Egypt’s stabilization and democratic transition.

South Korea - Seoul’s Foreign Ministry described the bombing as an “inhuman and unethical act,” voicing shock, condemnation, and appreciation for Egypt and Israel’s swift medical response. It introduced a travel ban for its citizens visiting Sinai and surrounding regions.

Arab League - Secretary-General Nabil al‑Arabi strongly denounced the bombing, characterizing it as an assault on Egyptian tourism and the broader region’s stability.

United Nations - UN Secretary-General Ban Ki‑moon issued a strong condemnation, offered condolences to Egypt and South Korea, and called for those responsible to be brought to justice. The UN Security Council similarly condemned the attack, emphasizing terrorism’s threat to international peace.

== See also ==
- October 2014 Sinai attacks
- January 2015 Sana'a bombing
- Sinai insurgency
