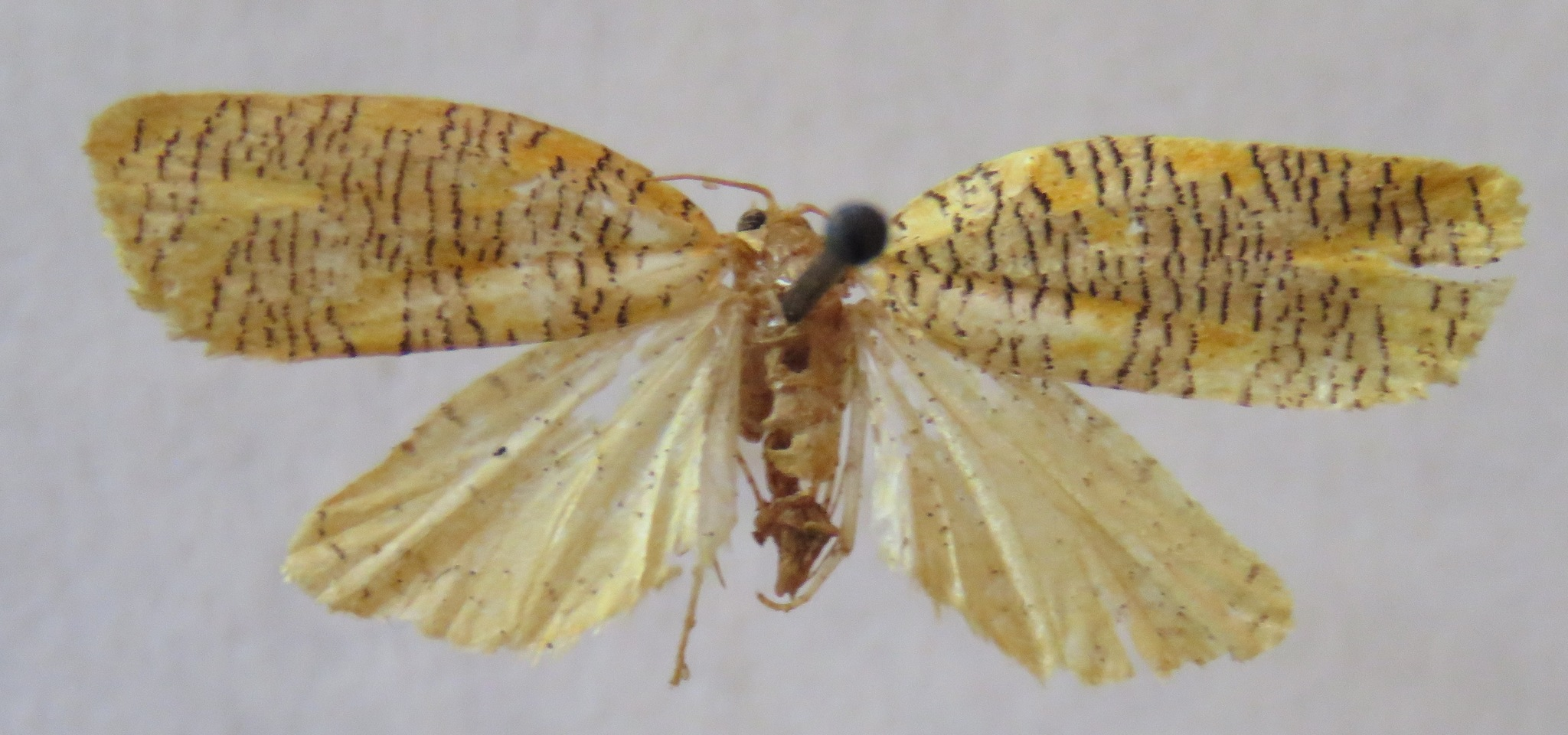

Scientific classification
- Kingdom: Animalia
- Phylum: Arthropoda
- Class: Insecta
- Order: Lepidoptera
- Family: Tortricidae
- Genus: Templemania
- Species: T. animosana

Binomial name
- Templemania animosana (Busck, 1907)

Synonyms
- Tortrix animosana Busck, 1907

= Templemania animosana =

Species of moth

Templemania animosana is a species of moth in the family Tortricidae. It is found in Veracruz, Mexico.
