= Anacrusis nephrodes =

Scientific classification
- Domain: Eukaryota
- Kingdom: Animalia
- Phylum: Arthropoda
- Class: Insecta
- Order: Lepidoptera
- Family: Tortricidae
- Genus: Anacrusis
- Species: A. nephrodes

Binomial name
- Anacrusis nephrodes (Walsingham, 1914)

Synonyms
- Tortrix nephrodes Walsingham, 1914

Species of moth

Anacrusis nephrodes is a species of moth of the family Tortricidae. It is found in Panama.
