= Anacrusis napoensis =

Scientific classification
- Kingdom: Animalia
- Phylum: Arthropoda
- Class: Insecta
- Order: Lepidoptera
- Family: Tortricidae
- Genus: Anacrusis
- Species: A. napoensis

Binomial name
- Anacrusis napoensis Razowski & Pelz, 2007

Species of moth

Anacrusis napoensis is a species of moth of the family Tortricidae. It is found in Napo Province, Ecuador.
