= Anacrusis erioheir =

Scientific classification
- Domain: Eukaryota
- Kingdom: Animalia
- Phylum: Arthropoda
- Class: Insecta
- Order: Lepidoptera
- Family: Tortricidae
- Genus: Anacrusis
- Species: A. erioheir

Binomial name
- Anacrusis erioheir Razowski & Wojtusiak, 2006

Species of moth

Anacrusis erioheir is a species of moth of the family Tortricidae. It is found in Ecuador (Morona-Santiago Province and Napo Province).

The wingspan is about 30 millimetres (1.2 in).

== Etymology ==
The species name refers to termination of the uncus and is derived from Greek erio (meaning a strengthening prefix, meaning very and heir (meaning claw)).
