= Anacrusis marriana =

Scientific classification
- Domain: Eukaryota
- Kingdom: Animalia
- Phylum: Arthropoda
- Class: Insecta
- Order: Lepidoptera
- Family: Tortricidae
- Genus: Anacrusis
- Species: A. marriana

Binomial name
- Anacrusis marriana (Stoll, in Cramer, 1782)

Synonyms
- Phalaena (Tortrix) marriana Stoll, in Cramer, 1782

Species of moth

Anacrusis marriana is a species of moth of the family Tortricidae. It is found in Santa Catarina, Brazil.
