= Anacrusis epidicta =

Scientific classification
- Kingdom: Animalia
- Phylum: Arthropoda
- Clade: Pancrustacea
- Class: Insecta
- Order: Lepidoptera
- Family: Tortricidae
- Genus: Anacrusis
- Species: A. epidicta

Binomial name
- Anacrusis epidicta Razowski & Becker, 2011

Species of moth

Anacrusis epidicta is a species of moth of the family Tortricidae. It is found in Bahia, Brazil.

The wingspan is about 28 mm.

== Etymology ==
The species name refers to the colouration of the species and is derived from Greek near and Latin dicta, from dico (meaning marked).
