= Tina audaculana =

Scientific classification
- Kingdom: Animalia
- Phylum: Arthropoda
- Class: Insecta
- Order: Lepidoptera
- Family: Tortricidae
- Genus: Tina
- Species: T. audaculana

Binomial name
- Tina audaculana (Busck, 1907)

Synonyms
- Archips audaculana Busck, 1907

Species of moth

Tina audaculana is a species of moth of the family Tortricidae. It is found in Veracruz, Mexico.
