= Holoptygma sarahpelzae =

Scientific classification
- Kingdom: Animalia
- Phylum: Arthropoda
- Class: Insecta
- Order: Lepidoptera
- Family: Tortricidae
- Genus: Holoptygma
- Species: H. sarahpelzae

Binomial name
- Holoptygma sarahpelzae Razowski & Pelz, 2007

Species of moth

Holoptygma sarahpelzae is a species of moth of the family Tortricidae. It is found in Ecuador.
