= Atteria transversana =

Scientific classification
- Kingdom: Animalia
- Phylum: Arthropoda
- Class: Insecta
- Order: Lepidoptera
- Family: Tortricidae
- Genus: Atteria
- Species: A. transversana

Binomial name
- Atteria transversana (Walker, 1863)

Synonyms
- Gauris transversana Walker, 1863

Species of moth

Atteria transversana is a species of moth of the family Tortricidae. It is found in Venezuela.
