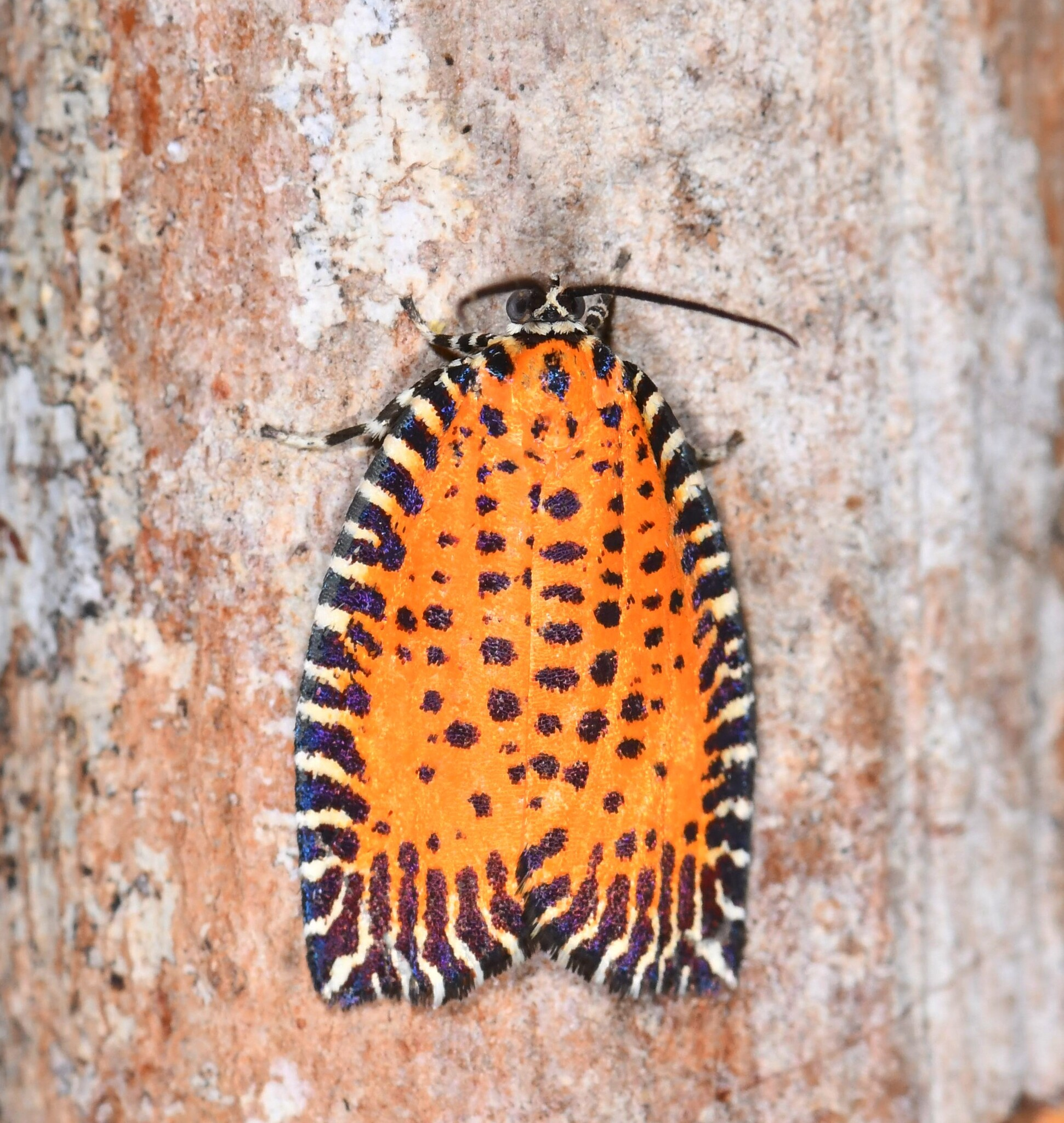

Scientific classification
- Kingdom: Animalia
- Phylum: Arthropoda
- Class: Insecta
- Order: Lepidoptera
- Family: Tortricidae
- Genus: Atteria
- Species: A. drucei

Binomial name
- Atteria drucei Walsingham, 1914

= Atteria drucei =

Species of moth

Atteria drucei is a species of moth in the family Tortricidae. It is found in Panama.
