= Anacrusis rubida =

Scientific classification
- Domain: Eukaryota
- Kingdom: Animalia
- Phylum: Arthropoda
- Class: Insecta
- Order: Lepidoptera
- Family: Tortricidae
- Genus: Anacrusis
- Species: A. rubida

Binomial name
- Anacrusis rubida Razowski, 2004

Species of moth

Anacrusis rubida is a species of moth of the family Tortricidae. It is found in Ecuador.

The wingspan is about 14 mm for males and about 30 mm for females.

== Etymology ==
The species name refers to the colouration of the forewing and is derived from rubida (meaning red).
