= Anacrusis subruptimacula =

Scientific classification
- Kingdom: Animalia
- Phylum: Arthropoda
- Clade: Pancrustacea
- Class: Insecta
- Order: Lepidoptera
- Family: Tortricidae
- Genus: Anacrusis
- Species: A. subruptimacula

Binomial name
- Anacrusis subruptimacula Razowski & Becker, 2011

Species of moth

Anacrusis subruptimacula is a species of moth of the family Tortricidae. It is found in Ecuador in the provinces of Carchi and Napo.

The wingspan is about 30 mm.
