= Atteria strigicinctana =

Scientific classification
- Kingdom: Animalia
- Phylum: Arthropoda
- Clade: Pancrustacea
- Class: Insecta
- Order: Lepidoptera
- Family: Tortricidae
- Genus: Atteria
- Species: A. strigicinctana

Binomial name
- Atteria strigicinctana Walker, 1863

Species of moth

Atteria strigicinctana is a species of moth of the family Tortricidae. It is found in Colombia. According to Józef Razowski and co-authors, Atteria strigicinctana was described from Venezuela.
