= Anacrusis gutta =

Scientific classification
- Domain: Eukaryota
- Kingdom: Animalia
- Phylum: Arthropoda
- Class: Insecta
- Order: Lepidoptera
- Family: Tortricidae
- Genus: Anacrusis
- Species: A. gutta

Binomial name
- Anacrusis gutta Razowski & Wojtusiak, 2009

Species of moth

Anacrusis gutta is a species of moth of the family Tortricidae. It is found in Pichincha Province, Ecuador.

The wingspan is about 28 mm.

== Etymology ==
The species name refers to the drop shaped forewing blotch and is derived from Latin gutta (meaning a drop).
