= Anacrusis aerobatica =

Scientific classification
- Kingdom: Animalia
- Phylum: Arthropoda
- Class: Insecta
- Order: Lepidoptera
- Family: Tortricidae
- Genus: Anacrusis
- Species: A. aerobatica

Binomial name
- Anacrusis aerobatica (Meyrick, 1917)

Synonyms
- Cacoecia aerobatica Meyrick, 1917

Species of moth

Anacrusis aerobatica is a species of moth of the family Tortricidae. It is found in Colombia and Ecuador.
