= Tina, Guadalcanal =

Tina
- Village
- Location in Guadalcanal
- Coordinates: 9°16′19″S 159°39′53″E
- Country: Solomon Islands
- Province: Guadalcanal
- Island: Guadalcanal
- Time zone: UTC+11 (UTC)

Tina is a village just south of Taba near the northwest coast of Guadalcanal, Solomon Islands. It is located 43.8 kilometres (27.2 mi) by road northwest of Honiara.
