= Capua ruficapilla =

"Capua" ruficapilla

Scientific classification
- Kingdom: Animalia
- Phylum: Arthropoda
- Clade: Pancrustacea
- Class: Insecta
- Order: Lepidoptera
- Family: Tortricidae
- Subfamily: Tortricinae
- Tribe: Atteriini
- Genus: incertae sedis
- Species: "C." ruficapilla

Binomial name
- "Capua" ruficapilla Meyrick, 1932

Species of moth

"Capua" ruficapilla is a species of moth of the family Tortricidae. It is found in Bolivia.
