= Anacrusis (moth) =

Scientific classification
- Kingdom: Animalia
- Phylum: Arthropoda
- Clade: Pancrustacea
- Class: Insecta
- Order: Lepidoptera
- Family: Tortricidae
- Tribe: Atteriini
- Genus: Anacrusis; Zeller, 1877

Genus of tortrix moths

Anacrusis is a genus of moths belonging to the subfamily Tortricinae of the family Tortricidae.

== Species ==
- Anacrusis aerobatica (Meyrick, 1917)
- Anacrusis atrosparsana Zeller, 1877
- Anacrusis aulaeodes (Meyrick, 1926)
- Anacrusis brunnorbis Razowski & Wojtusiak, 2008
- Anacrusis epidicta Razowski & Becker, 2011
- Anacrusis erioheir Razowski & Wojtusiak, 2006
- Anacrusis gutta Razowski & Wojtusiak, 2009
- Anacrusis guttula Razowski & Wojtusiak, 2010
- Anacrusis marriana (Stoll, in Cramer, 1782)
- Anacrusis napoensis Razowski & Pelz, 2007
- Anacrusis nephrodes (Walsingham, 1914)
- Anacrusis rhizosema (Meyrick, 1931)
- Anacrusis rubida Razowski, 2004
- Anacrusis ruptimacula (Dognin, 1904)
- Anacrusis russomitrana Razowski & Becker, in Razowski, 2004
- Anacrusis securiferana (Walker, 1866)
- Anacrusis stapiana (Felder & Rogenhofer, 1875)
- Anacrusis subruptimacula Razowski & Becker, 2011
- Anacrusis thunberghiana (Stoll, 1782)
- Anacrusis turrialbae Razowski & Becker, 2011
- Anacrusis yanayacana Razowski & Wojtusiak, 2010

== See also ==
- List of Tortricidae genera
