= Templemania rhythmogramma =

Scientific classification
- Domain: Eukaryota
- Kingdom: Animalia
- Phylum: Arthropoda
- Class: Insecta
- Order: Lepidoptera
- Family: Tortricidae
- Genus: Templemania
- Species: T. rhythmogramma

Binomial name
- Templemania rhythmogramma (Meyrick, 1924)

Synonyms
- Cacoecia rhythmogramma Meyrick, 1924; Templemania rhymogramma Razowski, 2000

Species of moth

Templemania rhythmogramma is a species of moth of the family Tortricidae. It is found in Zacualpan, Mexico.
