= Holoptygma lingunca =

Scientific classification
- Domain: Eukaryota
- Kingdom: Animalia
- Phylum: Arthropoda
- Class: Insecta
- Order: Lepidoptera
- Family: Tortricidae
- Genus: Holoptygma
- Species: H. lingunca

Binomial name
- Holoptygma lingunca Razowski & Wojtusiak, 2011

Species of moth

Holoptygma lingunca is a species of moth of the family Tortricidae. It is found in the Western Cordillera of Colombia.

The wingspan is about 24.5 mm.
