= Atteria =

Scientific classification
- Kingdom: Animalia
- Phylum: Arthropoda
- Class: Insecta
- Order: Lepidoptera
- Family: Tortricidae
- Tribe: Atteriini
- Genus: Atteria; Walker, 1863

Genus of tortrix moths

Atteria is a genus of moths belonging to the subfamily Tortricinae of the family Tortricidae.

== Species ==
- Atteria docima Druce, 1912
- Atteria drucei Walsingham, 1914
- Atteria pavimentata Meyrick, 1913
- Atteria strigicinctana Walker, 1863
- Atteria transversana (Walker, 1863)

== See also ==
- List of Tortricidae genera
