= List of extreme points of Israel =

This is a list of extreme points and elevation in Israel. The "base" listing includes East Jerusalem and the Golan Heights. Relative to the "base" listing, no changes are made by including the West Bank; the Gaza Strip is not included owing to Israel's official withdrawal in 2005.

== Elevation ==
- The Lowest point: Dead Sea: −430.5 metres (−1,412 ft) (Also, the lowest point on Earth)
- The Highest point: Mount Hermon: 2,236 metres (7,336 ft)
- Within the Green Line: Mount Meron: 1,204 metres (3,950 ft)

== Extreme points ==
- Northernmost point (including Golan Heights): Mount Hermon: 33°19′N 35°46′E
  - Northernmost point (excluding Golan Heights): on the border with Lebanon, north of Metula: 33°17′N 35°34′E (within the Green Line)
- Southernmost point: Taba Border Crossing: 29°29′N 34°54′E
- Easternmost point (including Golan Heights): On the Blue Line border with Syria, near Al-Rafid, Syria (in the Israeli-controlled Golan Heights, unilaterally annexed in 1981): 32°56′N 35°53′E
  - Easternmost point (excluding Golan Heights): the border with the Golan Heights (near Kibbutz Dan, Israel, on Si'on River): 33°14′N 35°40′E (within the Green Line)
- Westernmost point: Tripoint border with Egypt and the Gaza Strip: 31°13′12″N 34°16′03″E

== See also ==
- Extreme points of Earth
