= Atteria pavimentata =

Scientific classification
- Kingdom: Animalia
- Phylum: Arthropoda
- Class: Insecta
- Order: Lepidoptera
- Family: Tortricidae
- Genus: Atteria
- Species: A. pavimentata

Binomial name
- Atteria pavimentata Meyrick, 1913

Species of moth

Atteria pavimentata is a species of moth of the family Tortricidae. It is found in Peru.
