= Anacrusis aulaeodes =

Scientific classification
- Kingdom: Animalia
- Phylum: Arthropoda
- Class: Insecta
- Order: Lepidoptera
- Family: Tortricidae
- Genus: Anacrusis
- Species: A. aulaeodes

Binomial name
- Anacrusis aulaeodes (Meyrick, 1926)

Synonyms
- Eulia aulaeodes Meyrick, 1926

Species of moth

Anacrusis aulaeodes is a species of moth of the family Tortricidae. It is found in Colombia.
