= Holoptygma lurida =

Scientific classification
- Kingdom: Animalia
- Phylum: Arthropoda
- Class: Insecta
- Order: Lepidoptera
- Family: Tortricidae
- Genus: Holoptygma
- Species: H. lurida

Binomial name
- Holoptygma lurida (Meyrick, 1912)

Synonyms
- Ctenopseustis lurida Meyrick, 1912

Species of moth

Holoptygma lurida is a species of moth of the family Tortricidae. It is found in Colombia, Ecuador and Costa Rica.
