= Steigenberger Hotel & Nelson Village =

Resort hotel in Taba, Egypt

Coordinates: 29.4904°N 34.8994°E

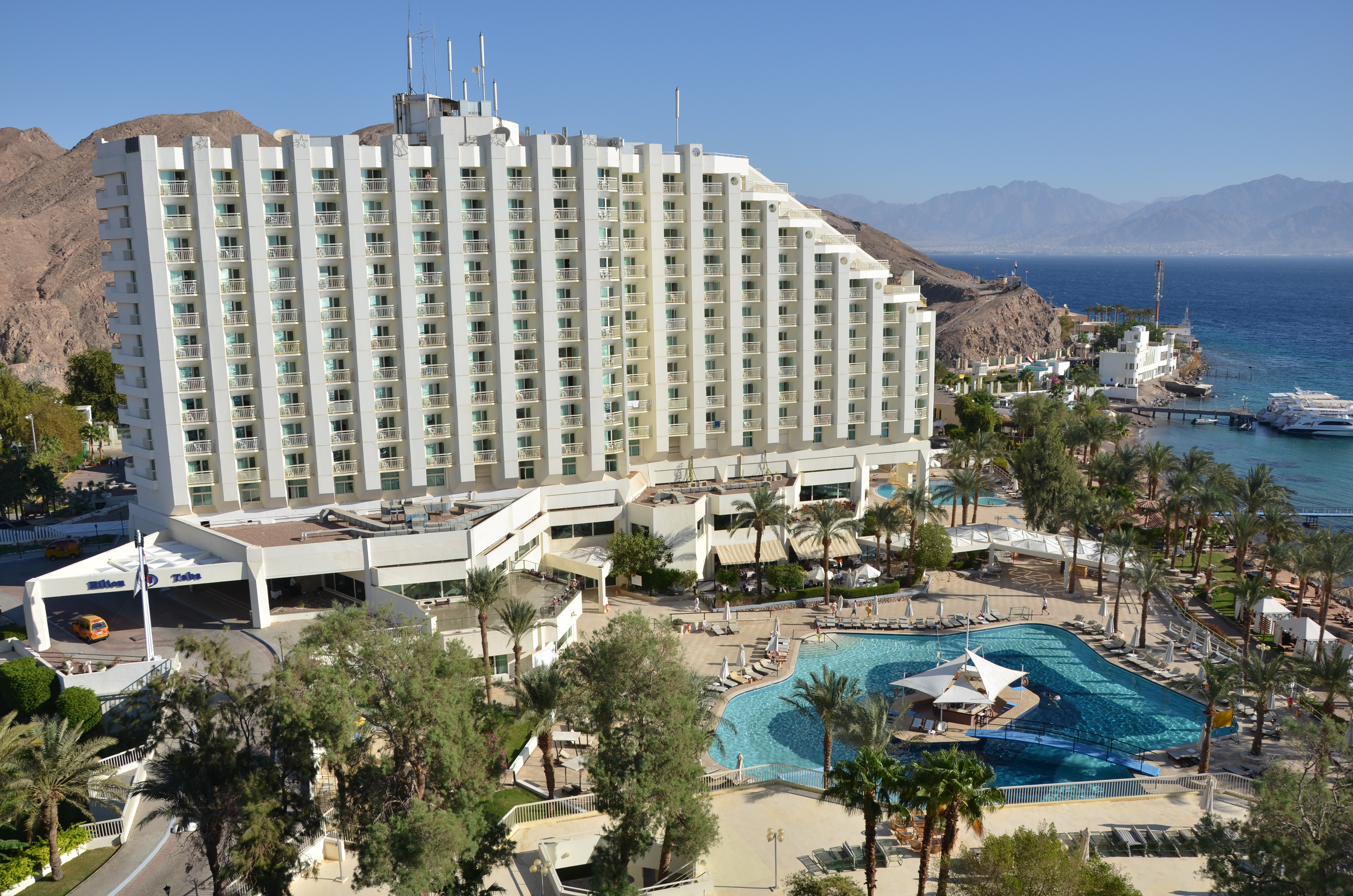
- Former names: Sonesta Hotel & Kfar Nelson

General information
- Location: Taba, Egypt
- Opening: November 1, 1982
- Owner: Taba Tourism Development Company
- Operator: Steigenberger Hotels

Other information
- Number of rooms: 400

Website
- Official website

The Steigenberger Hotel & Nelson Village (Arabic: هيلتون طابا) is a resort hotel in Taba, Egypt, just over 100 metres from the Taba Border Crossing.

== History ==
Eliyahu Paposchado began construction of the Aviya-Sonesta Beach Hotel in 1979, while the Sinai was under Israeli control. The hotel was located 6 km (3.7 mi) from Eilat and next to Rafi Nelson's Nelson Village, also known as Rafi Nelson's Holiday Village. The village was a center for musical and cultural activity and attracted Israel's who's who in the late 1960s and 1970s.

After the peace agreements were signed in 1979 between the two nations, the status of the incomplete hotel and the village were to be decided by future negotiations. Due to a disagreement over the correct location of the boundary markers, it was the stumbling block in negotiations between Israel and Egypt over the final border between the two countries.

The hotel received its first guests on November 1, 1982 and celebrated its grand opening on November 15, 1982. On the bottom floor, there is an 8.5 m (28 ft) high wall relief, made in 1980–81 with a Hebrew inscription by the Jerusalem sculptor, Daniel Kafri.

In 1986, after months of negotiation, an international arbitration panel decided to return the tiny strip of land to Egyptian control, but allowed Israelis to freely visit the tiny strip without paying a tax (to this day tourists do not pay a tax when travelling between Eilat and the hotel). The hotel was sold to Egypt for $35 million. In January 1989 the hotel and adjacent village were turned over to Egypt.

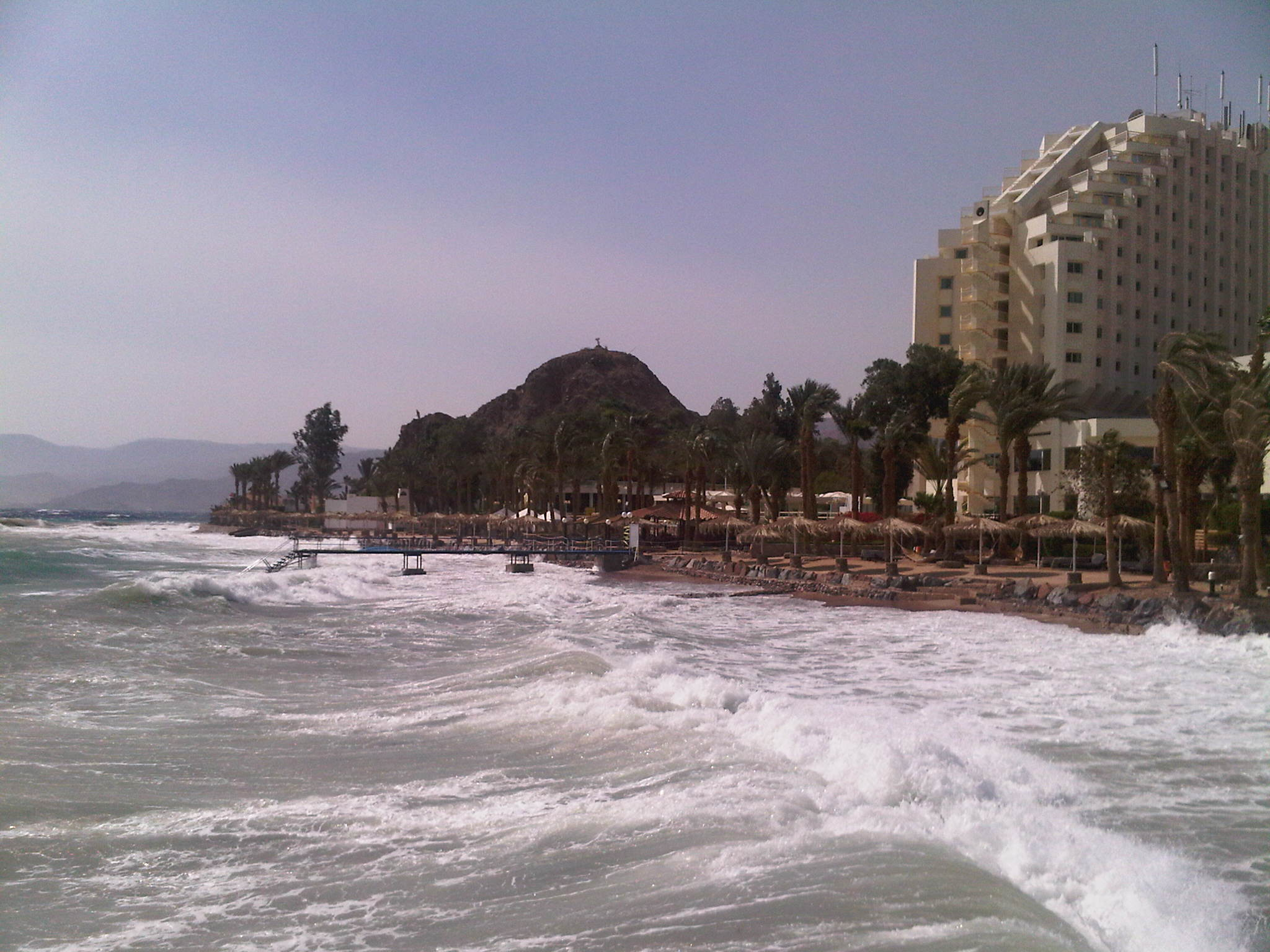
Hilton Taba (view from the Gulf of Aqaba)

The hotel became the Hilton Taba on September 1, 1989. It was very popular with Israeli tourists until it was targeted by terrorists in the 2004 Sinai bombings in which 34 people died and hundreds were wounded in the attack. Afterward, the hotel underwent major renovations, but saw a drastic drop in Israeli tourists. Hilton International denied liability to the victims of the terror attack on its grounds and refused to compensate its guests. Some victims sought compensation through legal challenges in Miami and New York, but the lawsuits were ultimately dismissed for forum non conveniens. Subsequently, an Israeli court ruled that the victims were not entitled to compensation by Hilton.

In 2017, Deutsche Hospitality signed a management contract with the hotel's owner, Taba Tourism Development Company, which renovated and reopened the hotel as the Taba Hotel & Nelson Village, managed by DH's Steigenberger Hotels and Resorts brand. In 2023, the hotel was renamed Steigenberger Hotel & Nelson Village, following another renovation.

== See also ==
- 2004 Sinai bombings
