= Templemania =

Scientific classification
- Domain: Eukaryota
- Kingdom: Animalia
- Phylum: Arthropoda
- Class: Insecta
- Order: Lepidoptera
- Family: Tortricidae
- Tribe: Atteriini
- Genus: Templemania; Busck, 1940

Genus of tortrix moths

Templemania is a genus of moths belonging to the subfamily Tortricinae of the family Tortricidae.

== Species ==
- Templemania animosana (Busck, 1907)
- Templemania millistriata (Walsingham, 1914)
- Templemania rhythmogramma (Meyrick, 1924)
- Templemania sarothrura (Felder & Rogenhofer, 1875)

== See also ==
- List of Tortricidae genera
