= Templemania sarothrura =

Scientific classification
- Domain: Eukaryota
- Kingdom: Animalia
- Phylum: Arthropoda
- Class: Insecta
- Order: Lepidoptera
- Family: Tortricidae
- Genus: Templemania
- Species: T. sarothrura

Binomial name
- Templemania sarothrura (Felder & Rogenhofer, 1875)

Synonyms
- Tortrix sarothrura Felder & Rogenhofer, 1875; Tortrix auricomana Busck, 1907

Species of moth

Templemania sarothrura is a species of moth of the family Tortricidae. It is found in Mexico (Distrito Federal, Veracruz).
