= Anacrusis ruptimacula =

Scientific classification
- Domain: Eukaryota
- Kingdom: Animalia
- Phylum: Arthropoda
- Class: Insecta
- Order: Lepidoptera
- Family: Tortricidae
- Genus: Anacrusis
- Species: A. ruptimacula

Binomial name
- Anacrusis ruptimacula (Dognin, 1904)

Synonyms
- Tortrix ruptimacula Dognin, 1904

Species of moth

Anacrusis ruptimacula is a species of moth of the family Tortricidae. It is found in Ecuador in Loja and Napo provinces.
