= Anacrusis turrialbae =

Scientific classification
- Kingdom: Animalia
- Phylum: Arthropoda
- Clade: Pancrustacea
- Class: Insecta
- Order: Lepidoptera
- Family: Tortricidae
- Genus: Anacrusis
- Species: A. turrialbae

Binomial name
- Anacrusis turrialbae Razowski & Becker, 2011

Species of moth

Anacrusis turrialbae is a species of moth of the family Tortricidae. It is found in Costa Rica.

The wingspan is about 27 mm for males and 31 mm for females.
