= Anacrusis atrosparsana =

Scientific classification
- Kingdom: Animalia
- Phylum: Arthropoda
- Clade: Pancrustacea
- Class: Insecta
- Order: Lepidoptera
- Family: Tortricidae
- Genus: Anacrusis
- Species: A. atrosparsana

Binomial name
- Anacrusis atrosparsana Zeller, 1877

Species of moth

Anacrusis atrosparsana is a species of moth of the family Tortricidae. It is found in Brazil.
