= Holoptygma =

Scientific classification
- Kingdom: Animalia
- Phylum: Arthropoda
- Clade: Pancrustacea
- Class: Insecta
- Order: Lepidoptera
- Family: Tortricidae
- Tribe: Atteriini
- Genus: Holoptygma; Powell, 1986

Genus of tortrix moths

Holoptygma is a genus of moths belonging to the family Tortricidae.

== Species ==
- Holoptygma braulio Razowski & Becker, 2011
- Holoptygma lingunca Razowski & Wojtusiak, 2011
- Holoptygma lurida (Meyrick, 1912)
- Holoptygma sarahpelzae Razowski & Pelz, 2007

== See also ==
- List of Tortricidae genera
