= Atteria docima =

Scientific classification
- Domain: Eukaryota
- Kingdom: Animalia
- Phylum: Arthropoda
- Class: Insecta
- Order: Lepidoptera
- Family: Tortricidae
- Genus: Atteria
- Species: A. docima

Binomial name
- Atteria docima H. Druce, 1912

Species of moth

Atteria docima is a species of moth of the family Tortricidae first described by Herbert Druce in 1912. It is found in Peru.
