= Anacrusis brunnorbis =

Scientific classification
- Domain: Eukaryota
- Kingdom: Animalia
- Phylum: Arthropoda
- Class: Insecta
- Order: Lepidoptera
- Family: Tortricidae
- Genus: Anacrusis
- Species: A. brunnorbis

Binomial name
- Anacrusis brunnorbis Razowski & Wojtusiak, 2008

Species of moth

Anacrusis brunnorbis is a species of moth of the family Tortricidae. It is found in Ecuador.

The wingspan is about 26.5 mm.
