= Holoptygma braulio =

Scientific classification
- Kingdom: Animalia
- Phylum: Arthropoda
- Clade: Pancrustacea
- Class: Insecta
- Order: Lepidoptera
- Family: Tortricidae
- Genus: Holoptygma
- Species: H. braulio

Binomial name
- Holoptygma braulio Razowski & Becker, 2011

Species of moth

Holoptygma braulio is a species of moth of the family Tortricidae. It is found in Costa Rica.

The wingspan is about 23 mm.

== Etymology ==
The species name refers to the type locality.
