= Thina =

Thina may refer to:

- Thīna, a Buddhist term sometimes translated as "sloth"
- Thina River, a tributary of the Mzimvubu River of South Africa
- Thîna (Θῖνα), an ancient Greek name of China
- Thinae (Θῖναι) or Thina, an ancient Greek name for one of the capital cities of China
- Thina, the Malayalam name for foxtail millet

== People ==
- Thina Thorleifsen (1885–1959), Norwegian politician
- Thina Chat, vocalist of the Greek band Dakrya

== See also ==
- Tina (disambiguation)
- Thena, a Marvel Comics character
