= Anacrusis stapiana =

Scientific classification
- Kingdom: Animalia
- Phylum: Arthropoda
- Clade: Pancrustacea
- Class: Insecta
- Order: Lepidoptera
- Family: Tortricidae
- Genus: Anacrusis
- Species: A. stapiana

Binomial name
- Anacrusis stapiana (Felder & Rogenhofer, 1875)

Synonyms
- Tortrix stapiana Felder & Rogenhofer, 1875; Cacoecia geographica Meyrick, 1912; Grapholitha piriferana Zeller, 1877; Anacrusis piriferana

Species of moth

Anacrusis stapiana is a species of moth of the family Tortricidae. It is found in Costa Rica, Panama and Brazil.

The larvae have been recorded feeding on Cedrella odorata.
