= Teena =

Teena may refer to:

People

- Brandon Teena (1972–1993), American murder victim
- Teena Marie (1956–2010), American singer, songwriter, and producer
- Teena Piccione, American businesswoman and politician
- Teena Rochfort-Smith (1861–1883), British Shakespeare scholar and philologist

Fictional characters

- Teena (comic strip), a cartoon panel series and comic strip created by Hilda Terry
- Teena Mulder, from The X-Files television series
- Teena the Fat Lady, a Marvel Comics character

== See also ==
- Tina (disambiguation)
- Tina (given name)
