= Anacrusis russomitrana =

Scientific classification
- Kingdom: Animalia
- Phylum: Arthropoda
- Clade: Pancrustacea
- Class: Insecta
- Order: Lepidoptera
- Family: Tortricidae
- Genus: Anacrusis
- Species: A. russomitrana

Binomial name
- Anacrusis russomitrana Razowski & Becker, in Razowski, 2004

Species of moth

Anacrusis russomitrana is a species of moth of the family Tortricidae. It is found in Rio de Janeiro, Brazil.

The wingspan is about 24 mm.
