= Anacrusis yanayacana =

Scientific classification
- Kingdom: Animalia
- Phylum: Arthropoda
- Class: Insecta
- Order: Lepidoptera
- Family: Tortricidae
- Genus: Anacrusis
- Species: A. yanayacana

Binomial name
- Anacrusis yanayacana Razowski & Wojtusiak, 2010

Species of moth

Anacrusis yanayacana is a species of moth of the family Tortricidae. It is found in Napo Province, Ecuador.

The wingspan is about 28 mm.

== Etymology ==
The species name refers to the name of the research station Yanayacu where the species was first found.
