= Anacrusis rhizosema =

Scientific classification
- Kingdom: Animalia
- Phylum: Arthropoda
- Class: Insecta
- Order: Lepidoptera
- Family: Tortricidae
- Genus: Anacrusis
- Species: A. rhizosema

Binomial name
- Anacrusis rhizosema (Meyrick, 1931)

Synonyms
- Eulia rhizosema Meyrick, 1931

Species of moth

Anacrusis rhizosema is a species of moth of the family Tortricidae. It is found in Brazil in the states of Santa Catarina and São Paulo.
