= Tina, Iran =

Tina تينا
- Village
- Location within Iran
- Coordinates: 32°21′52″N 49°24′25″E
- Country: Iran
- Province: Khuzestan
- County: Andika
- Bakhsh: Central
- Rural District: Qaleh-ye Khvajeh

Population (2006)
  - Total: 111
- Time zone: UTC+3:30 (IRST)
  - Summer (DST): UTC+4:30 (IRDT)

Tina (Persian: تينا, also Romanized as Tīnā) is a village in Qaleh-ye Khvajeh Rural District, in the Central District of Andika County, Khuzestan Province, Iran. At the 2006 census, its population was 111, in 15 families.
