= Tina (Yugoslav magazine) =

Youth magazine in Yugoslavia (1971–1976)

- Categories: Youth magazine
- Founded: 1971
- First issue: 26 May 1971
- Final issue Number: 29 December 1976; 231
- Company: Vjesnik
- Country: Yugoslavia
- Based in: Zagreb

Tina was a girls' magazine which existed in Yugoslavia between 1971 and 1976. It was published by Vjesnik and was the only publication in the country aimed at female youth. Its title was a reference to a British girls' magazine, Princess Tina, which had been established by Fleetway Publications in February 1967.

== History and profile ==
Tina was first published on 26 May 1971. Its publisher was Vjesnik, a publishing house based in Zagreb. The company was founded by the Socialist Alliance of Working People, one of the largest communist political organizations in Yugoslavia. In its early period Tina copied Western youth magazines, but it did not work, and the magazine sold only 35,739 copies in the first year. It gained success from 1974 when it began to cover materials specific to the Yugoslav setting, including progressive pop-culture, literary work and topics related to girls' daily lives. That year the circulation of Tina was 113,032 copies. The magazine infrequently published advertisements and other promotional content. Its editors and contributors included Gruda Špicer, Željko Žutelija and Vesna Lamza.

Tina sold less than 90,000 copies in 1975. Next year its circulation dropped to 77,542 copies which led to its closure after the publication of the issue 231 dated 29 December 1976.
