= Tina (moth) =

Scientific classification
- Kingdom: Animalia
- Phylum: Arthropoda
- Clade: Pancrustacea
- Class: Insecta
- Order: Lepidoptera
- Family: Tortricidae
- Tribe: Atteriini
- Genus: Tina; Powell, 1986

Genus of tortrix moths

Tina is a genus of moths belonging to the family Tortricidae.

== Species ==
- Tina audaculana ( Busck, 1907)

== See also ==
- List of Tortricidae genera
