= Taba, Egypt =

Town in South Sinai, Egypt

Taba طابا
- Town
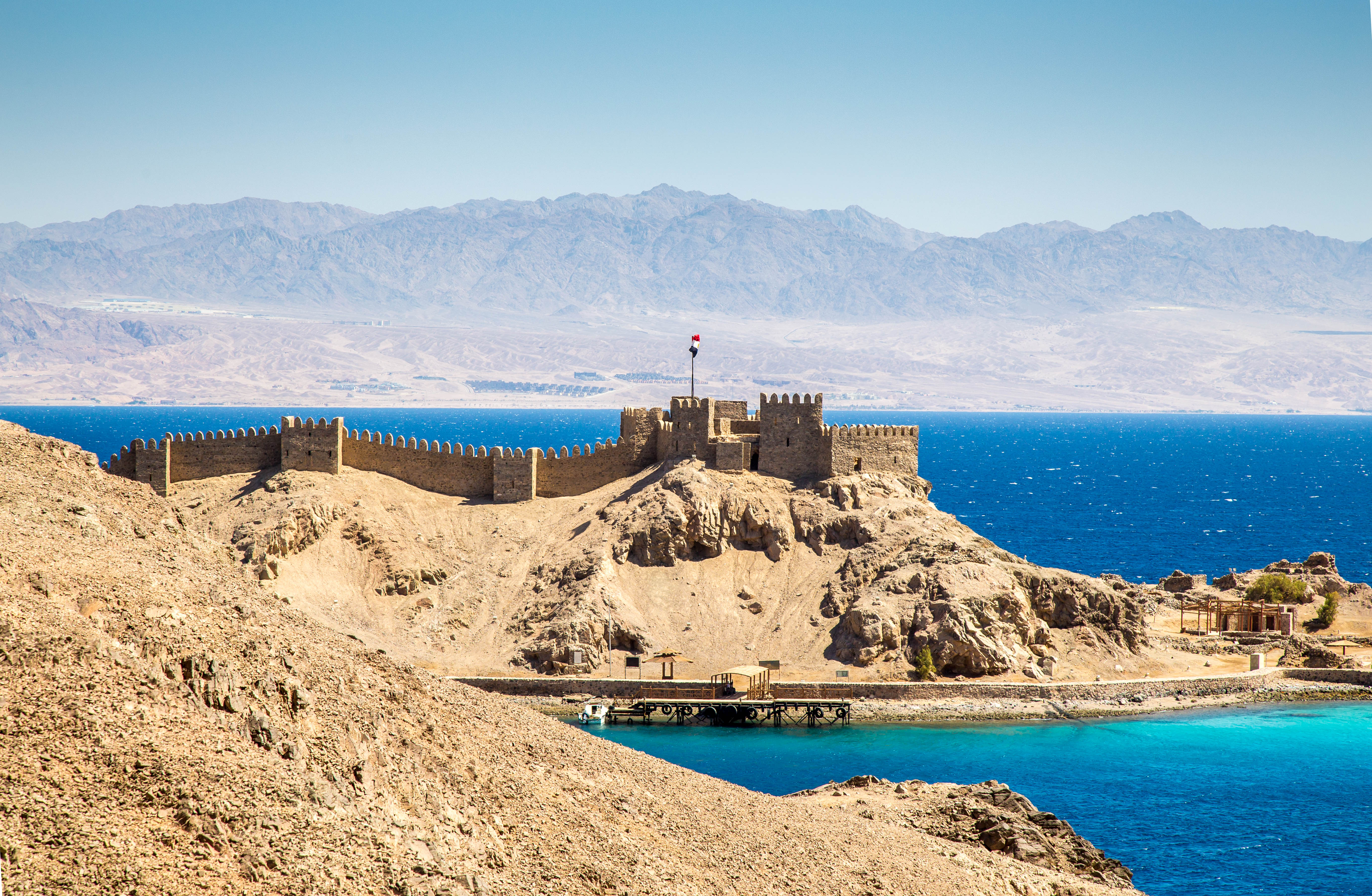
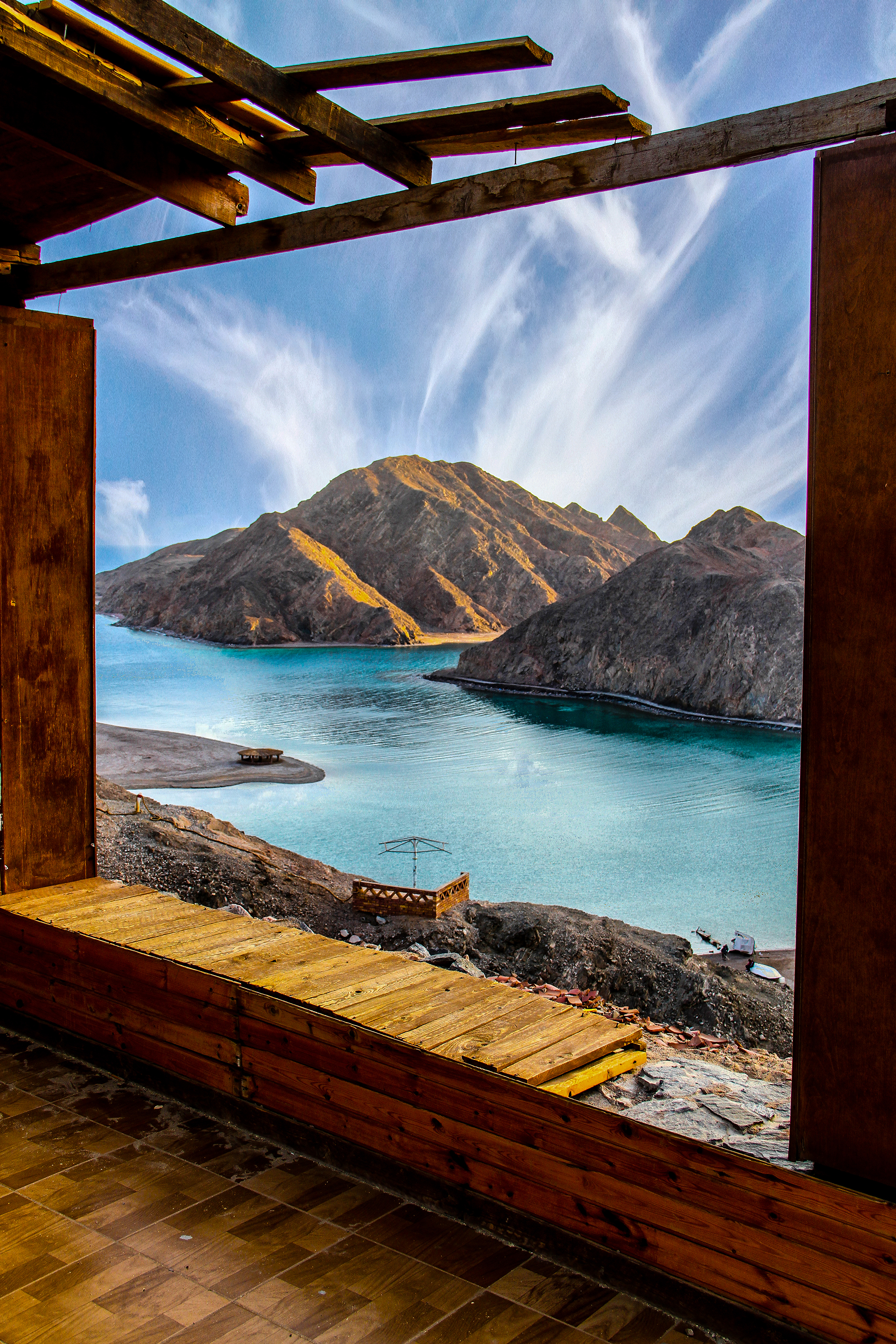
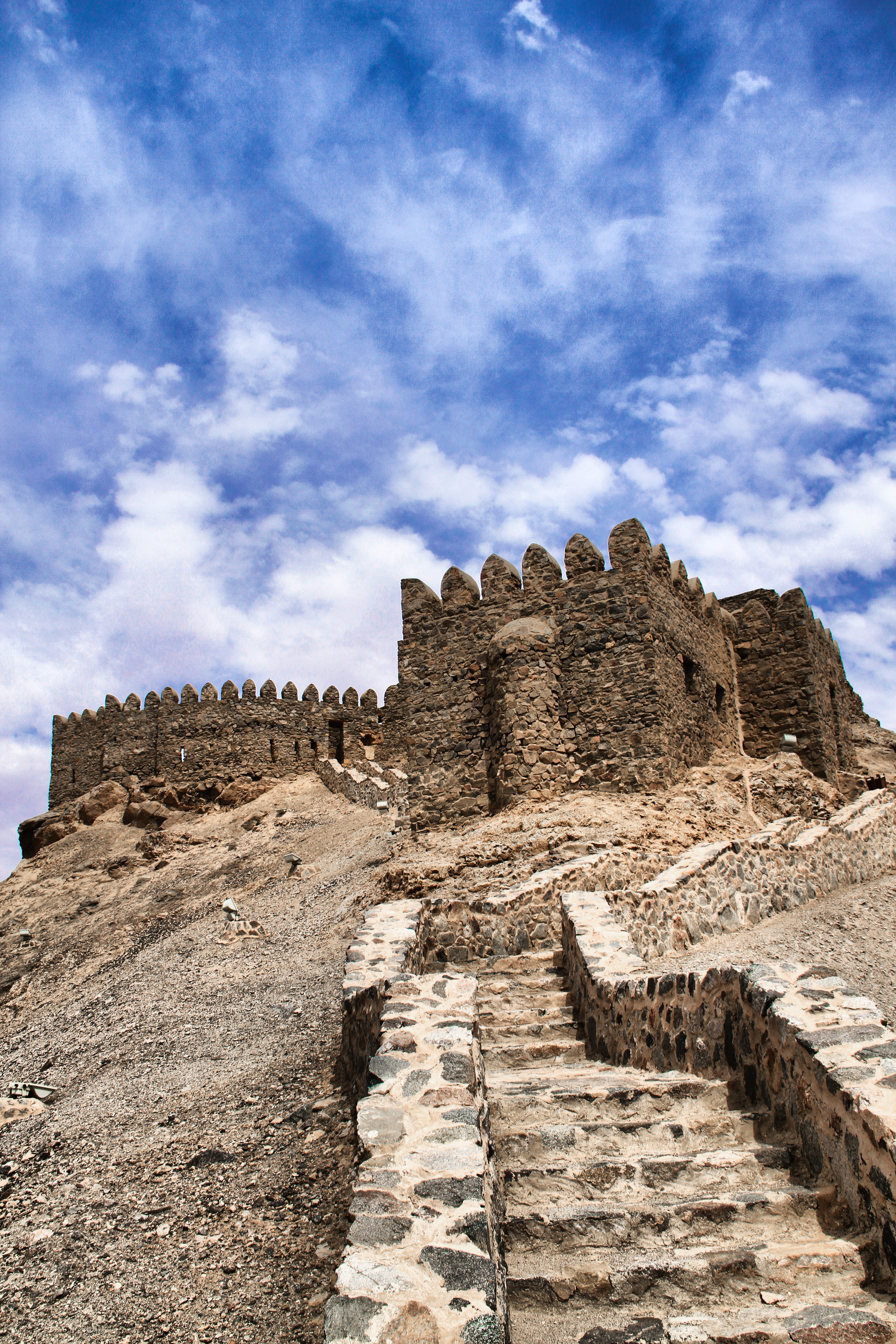
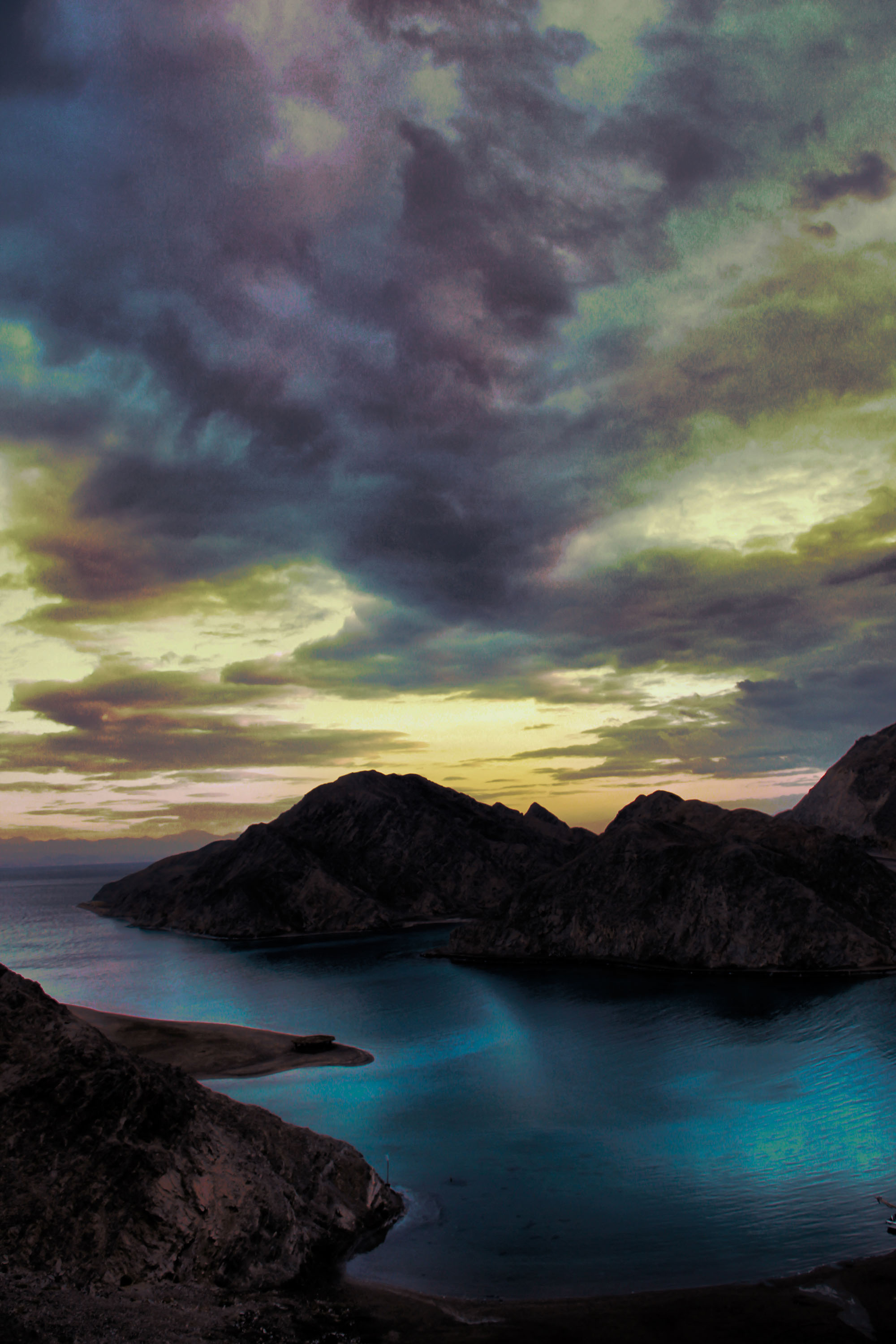
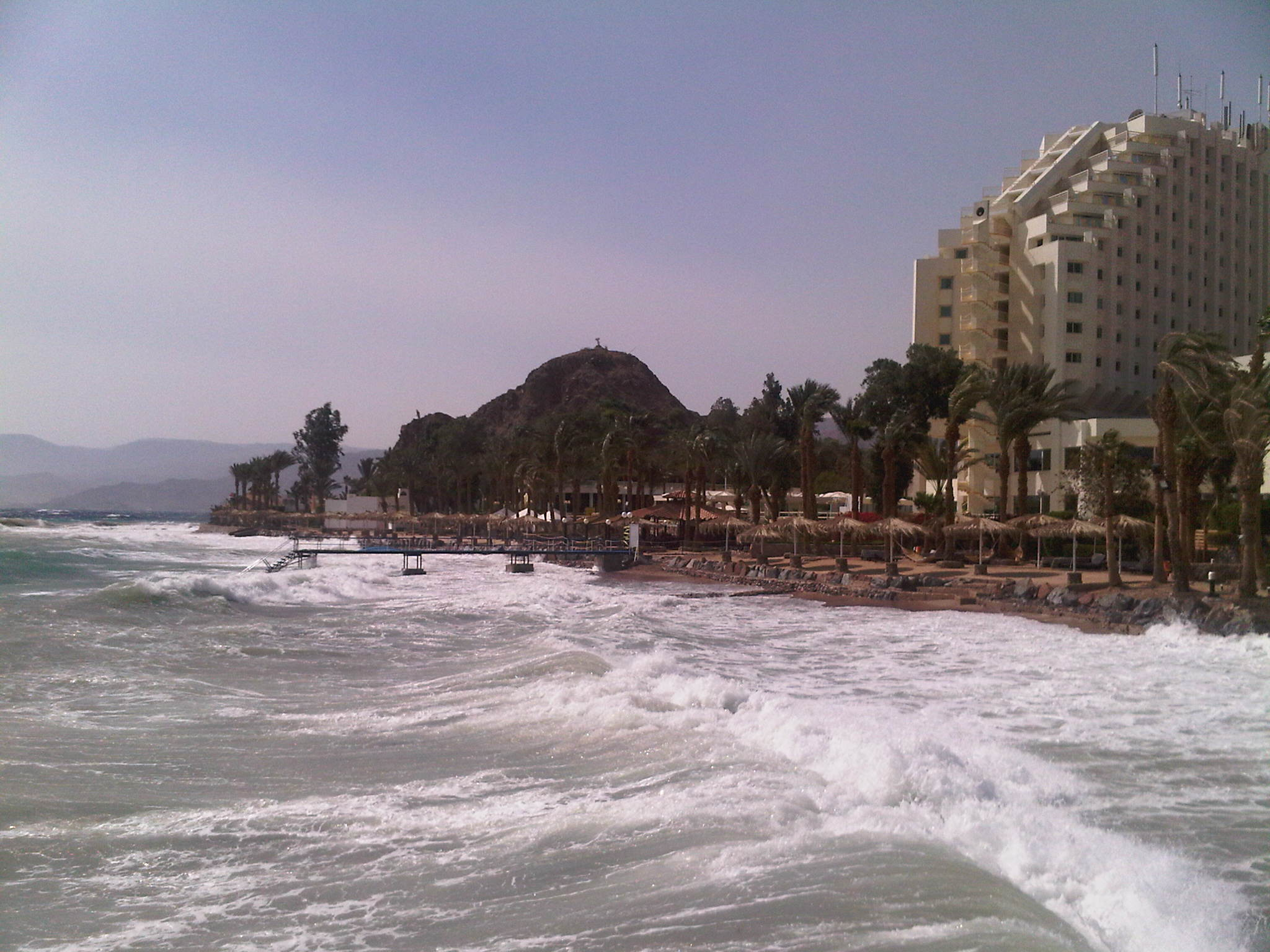
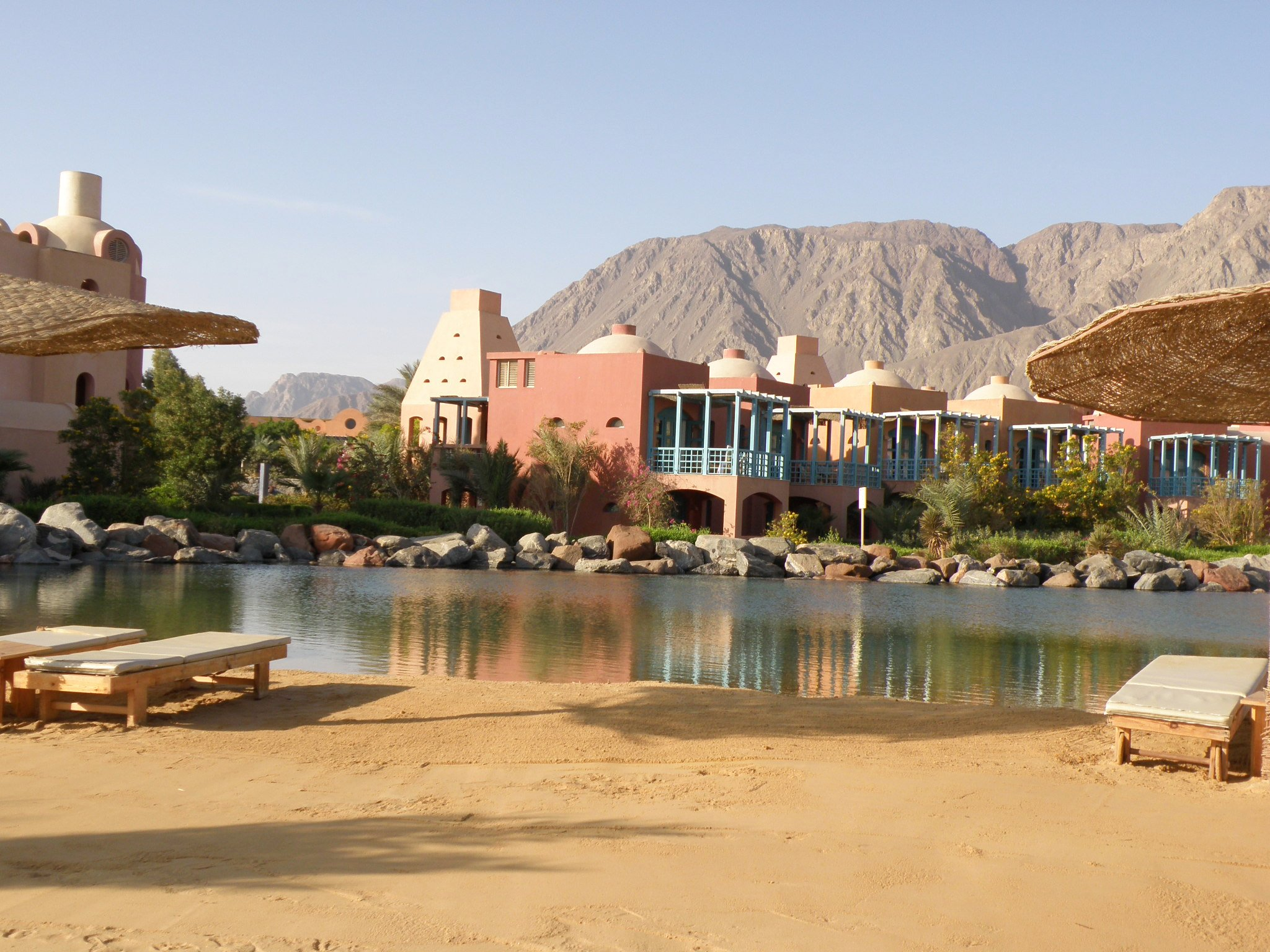
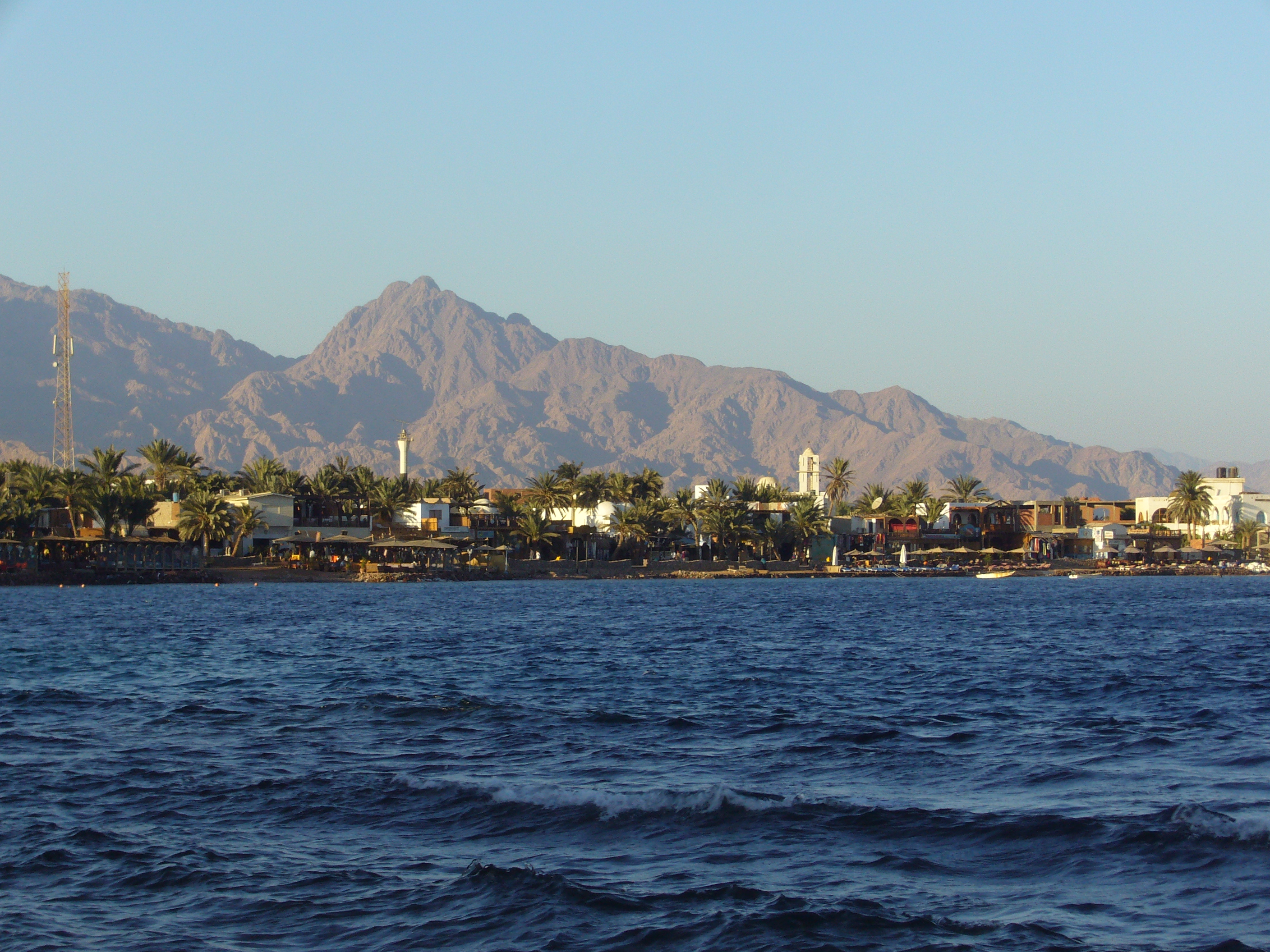
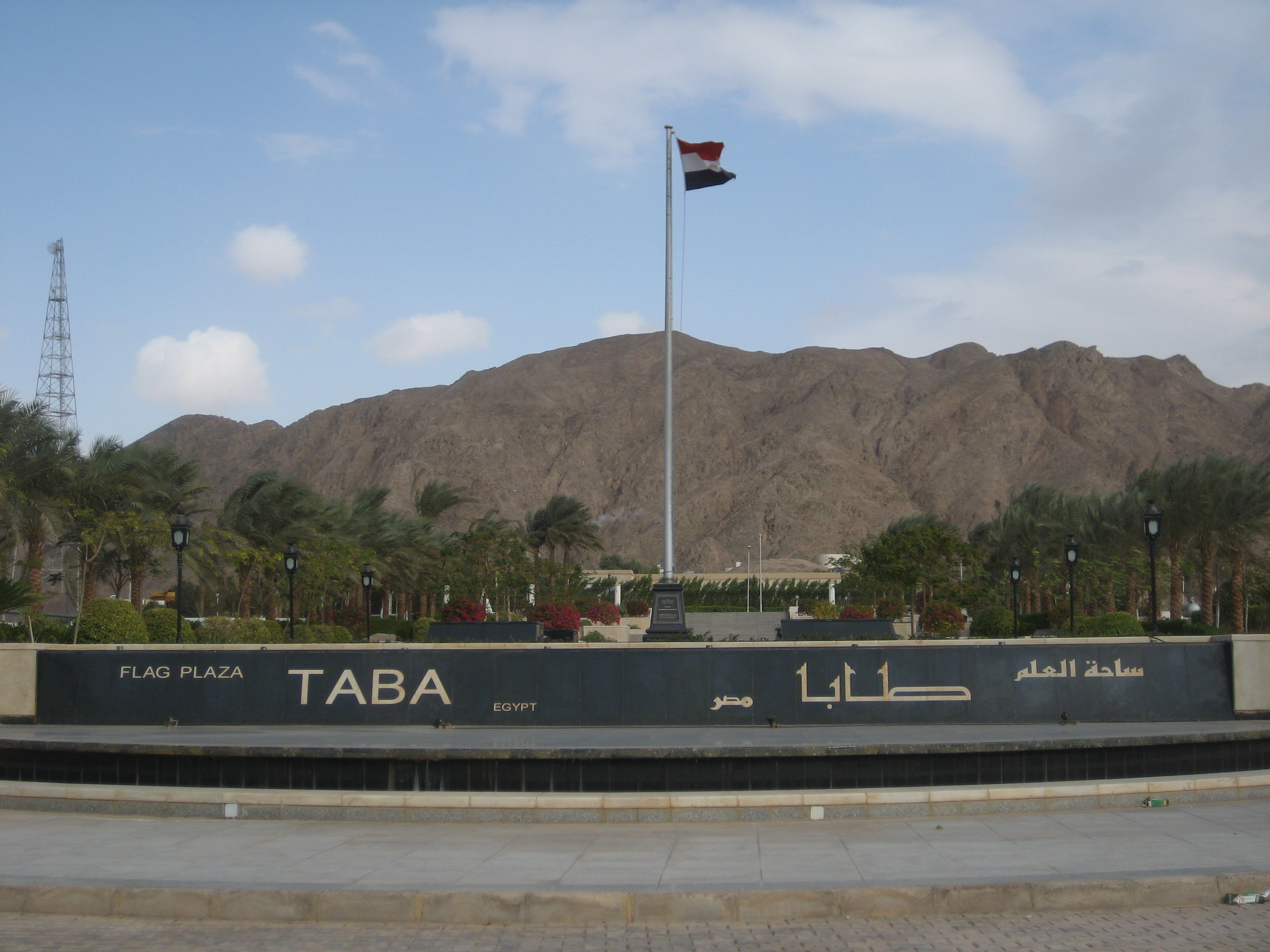
- Top-bottom, left-right: Pharaoh's Island, Fjord Bay, Saladin's Citadel walls, Fjord Bay's rest, Steigenberger Hotel & Nelson Village, Taba Heights, Panoramic view from the Red Sea, Egyptian flag
- Interactive map of Taba
- Location in Egypt Taba (Egypt) Taba (Middle East) Taba (Africa)
- Coordinates: 29°29′30″N 34°53′40″E
- Country: Egypt
- Governorate: South Sinai

Area
  - Total: 87.7 sq mi (227.1 km^{2})

Population (2015)
  - Total: 7,097
- Time zone: UTC+2 (EET)
  - Summer (DST): UTC+3 (EEST)

Taba (Egyptian Arabic: طابا Ṭābā, IPA: [ˈtˤɑːbɑ]) is a town in the South Sinai of Egypt, near the northern tip of the Gulf of Aqaba. Taba is the location of one of Egypt's busiest border crossings. It is the northernmost resort of Egypt's Red Sea Riviera.

== History ==
In 1906, Taba became the center of a territorial dispute between the British Empire and the Ottoman Empire, known as the "Taba Crisis." Although the Sinai Peninsula was nominally Ottoman, it had been largely administered by Egypt, except for the Aqaba region, which had been officially under Ottoman administration since 1892. When the Ottomans began plans to extend the Hejaz railway to the Gulf of Aqaba, potentially challenging British influence in the Red Sea via the Suez Canal, Britain dispatched Lieutenant Bramly with a small Egyptian force to establish police stations in the region. Upon encountering Ottoman troops already positioned in Taba — territory the British claimed as Egyptian — they demanded the immediate evacuation of Taba. The Ottomans refused, threatening to open fire, which led the British to deploy the warship Diana to the area. After several months of escalating tensions that threatened to spark an international conflict, with Taba as the only place the British considered Egyptian that the Ottomans refused to evacuate, Sultan Abdul Hamid II finally agreed to withdraw from Taba on 13 May 1906. Both the British and the Ottomans then agreed to demarcate a formal border that would run approximately straight from Rafah in a south-easterly direction to a point on the Gulf of Aqaba, not less than 5 kilometres (3 mi) from Aqaba. The border was initially marked with telegraph poles and these were later replaced by boundary pillars.

Taba was located on the Egyptian side of the armistice line in 1949. During the Suez Crisis in 1956, it was briefly occupied by Israel but restored to Egypt when the Israelis retreated in 1957. Israel reoccupied Taba after the Six-Day War in 1967, and a 400-room hotel was subsequently built in the town. Following the 1979 Egyptian-Israeli peace treaty, Egypt and Israel started to negotiate the exact position of the border.

Both parties agreed that all maps since 1915, except for one 1916 Turkish-German map, show Taba on the Egyptian side and that no dispute had previously been raised on the issue in the intervening years. Israel claimed that Taba had been on the Ottoman side of the 1906 Ottoman-British border agreement and claimed that errors had occurred when telegraph poles were replaced by boundary pillars in 1906–1907. It therefore maintained that the written 1906 agreement should take precedence over the demarcated boundary.

After a long dispute, Abraham Sofaer, Legal Advisor to the United States State Department, successfully arbitrated an agreement to submit the issue to an international commission composed of one Israeli, one Egyptian, and three outsiders. The commission rejected Israel's arguments and found that a demarcated border accepted for so long had acquired legal standing. It ruled that the relevant boundary was the one accepted during the Mandate period and reinstated the disputed pillar at its historical location. The decision, however, did not answer how the award would be implemented, a question instead determined by further negotiations. Sofaer and the U.S. State Department led negotiations over these outstanding implementation issues, ranging from the exact locations of the pillar to the management of the hotel. By February 26, 1989, the negotiations were completed and the award was implemented. Taba was returned to Egypt. Hosni Mubarak raised the Egyptian flag on the town on 19 March 1989.

As part of this subsequent agreement, travelers were permitted to cross from Israel at the border checkpoint, and visit the "Aqaba Coast Area of Sinai", (stretching from Taba down to Sharm El Sheikh, and including Nuweiba, Saint Catherine's Monastery, and Dahab), visa-free for up to 14 days, making Taba a popular tourist destination. The resort community of Taba Heights is located some 20 km (12 mi) south of Taba. It features several large hotels, including the Hyatt Regency, Marriott, Sofitel, and Intercontinental. It is also a significant diving area where many people come to either free dive, scuba dive, or learn to dive via the many diving courses available. Other recreation facilities include a new desert-style golf course.

On 24 September 1995, the Taba Agreement was signed by the Palestine Liberation Organization and the Israeli government in the town of Taba.

On 7 October 2004, the Hilton Taba was hit by a bomb that killed 34 people. Of the deaths, over 20 were Israeli, 5 were Egyptian and 1 Russian, along with many injured Israelis. Twenty-four days later, an inquiry by the Egyptian Interior Ministry into the bombings concluded that the perpetrators received no external help but were aided by Bedouins in the peninsula.

In February 2014, a bus taking tourists to Saint Catherine's Monastery in Sinai exploded in Taba as the bus was preparing to cross into Israel. Three South Koreans and one Egyptian were killed, and 14 South Koreans were injured. No group took responsibility for the blast.

Israeli tourism in Taba was up in 2016, with many traveling to enjoy the northernmost Red Sea resort.

On 27 October 2023, a drone crashed into a building next to a hospital. Six people were lightly injured. The six people would be discharged from the hospital after receiving the necessary first aid.

== Geography ==
=== Climate ===
Köppen–Geiger climate classification system classifies its climate as hot desert (BWh), as the rest of Egypt.

Climate data for Taba
Month	Jan	Feb	Mar	Apr	May	Jun	Jul	Aug	Sep	Oct	Nov	Dec	Year
Record high °C (°F)	27 (81)	31 (88)	34 (93)	41 (106)	44 (111)	44 (111)	47 (117)	46 (115)	43 (109)	39 (102)	37 (99)	31 (88)	47 (117)
Mean daily maximum °C (°F)	20.9 (69.6)	22.6 (72.7)	25.8 (78.4)	29.9 (85.8)	33.8 (92.8)	37.2 (99.0)	38.2 (100.8)	38.7 (101.7)	35.9 (96.6)	32.4 (90.3)	27.3 (81.1)	22.5 (72.5)	30.4 (86.8)
Daily mean °C (°F)	15.6 (60.1)	17.0 (62.6)	19.9 (67.8)	23.8 (74.8)	26.5 (79.7)	30.4 (86.7)	31.8 (89.2)	32.2 (90.0)	30.1 (86.2)	26.6 (79.9)	21.8 (71.2)	17.2 (63.0)	24.4 (75.9)
Mean daily minimum °C (°F)	10.4 (50.7)	11.4 (52.5)	14.0 (57.2)	17.7 (63.9)	19.3 (66.7)	23.7 (74.7)	25.5 (77.9)	25.7 (78.3)	24.4 (75.9)	20.9 (69.6)	16.3 (61.3)	11.9 (53.4)	18.4 (65.2)
Record low °C (°F)	3 (37)	3 (37)	8 (46)	11 (52)	16 (61)	21 (70)	22 (72)	23 (73)	21 (70)	16 (61)	8 (46)	5 (41)	3 (37)
Average precipitation mm (inches)	4 (0.2)	6 (0.2)	5 (0.2)	3 (0.1)	1 (0.0)	0 (0)	0 (0)	0 (0)	0 (0)	1 (0.0)	3 (0.1)	6 (0.2)	29 (1)
Average rainy days	2	1	2	1	1	0	0	0	0	0	1	2	10
Average relative humidity (%)	50	51	47	38	35	29	25	32	40	45	47	50	41
Mean daily sunshine hours	8	9	9	10	12	13	13	13	12	10	9	7	10
Source 1: Climate-Data.org, altitude: 14m
Source 2: BBC Weather for records and humidity, Weather2Travel for rainy days and sunshine

Taba heights' temperatures are slightly cooler and it has slightly more rainy days. It receives slightly less sunshine.

Climate data for Taba heights
Month	Jan	Feb	Mar	Apr	May	Jun	Jul	Aug	Sep	Oct	Nov	Dec	Year
Mean daily maximum °C (°F)	20 (68)	22 (72)	25 (77)	29 (84)	33 (91)	36 (97)	37 (99)	38 (100)	35 (95)	32 (90)	27 (81)	22 (72)	30 (86)
Mean daily minimum °C (°F)	10 (50)	11 (52)	14 (57)	17 (63)	19 (66)	23 (73)	25 (77)	25 (77)	24 (75)	20 (68)	16 (61)	12 (54)	18 (64)
Average precipitation mm (inches)	3 (0.1)	5 (0.2)	5 (0.2)	3 (0.1)	1 (0.0)	0 (0)	0 (0)	0 (0)	0 (0)	1 (0.0)	3 (0.1)	4 (0.2)	25 (0.9)
Average rainy days	2	2	2	2	1	0	0	0	0	1	1	2	13
Mean daily sunshine hours	8	9	9	10	11	13	13	12	11	10	9	7	10
Source: Weather2Travel

Taba mean sea temperature
Jan	Feb	Mar	Apr	May	Jun	Jul	Aug	Sep	Oct	Nov	Dec
22 °C (72 °F)	21 °C (70 °F)	21 °C (70 °F)	23 °C (73 °F)	25 °C (77 °F)	26 °C (79 °F)	28 °C (82 °F)	28 °C (82 °F)	28 °C (82 °F)	27 °C (81 °F)	25 °C (77 °F)	23 °C (73 °F)

=== Taba Protected Area ===
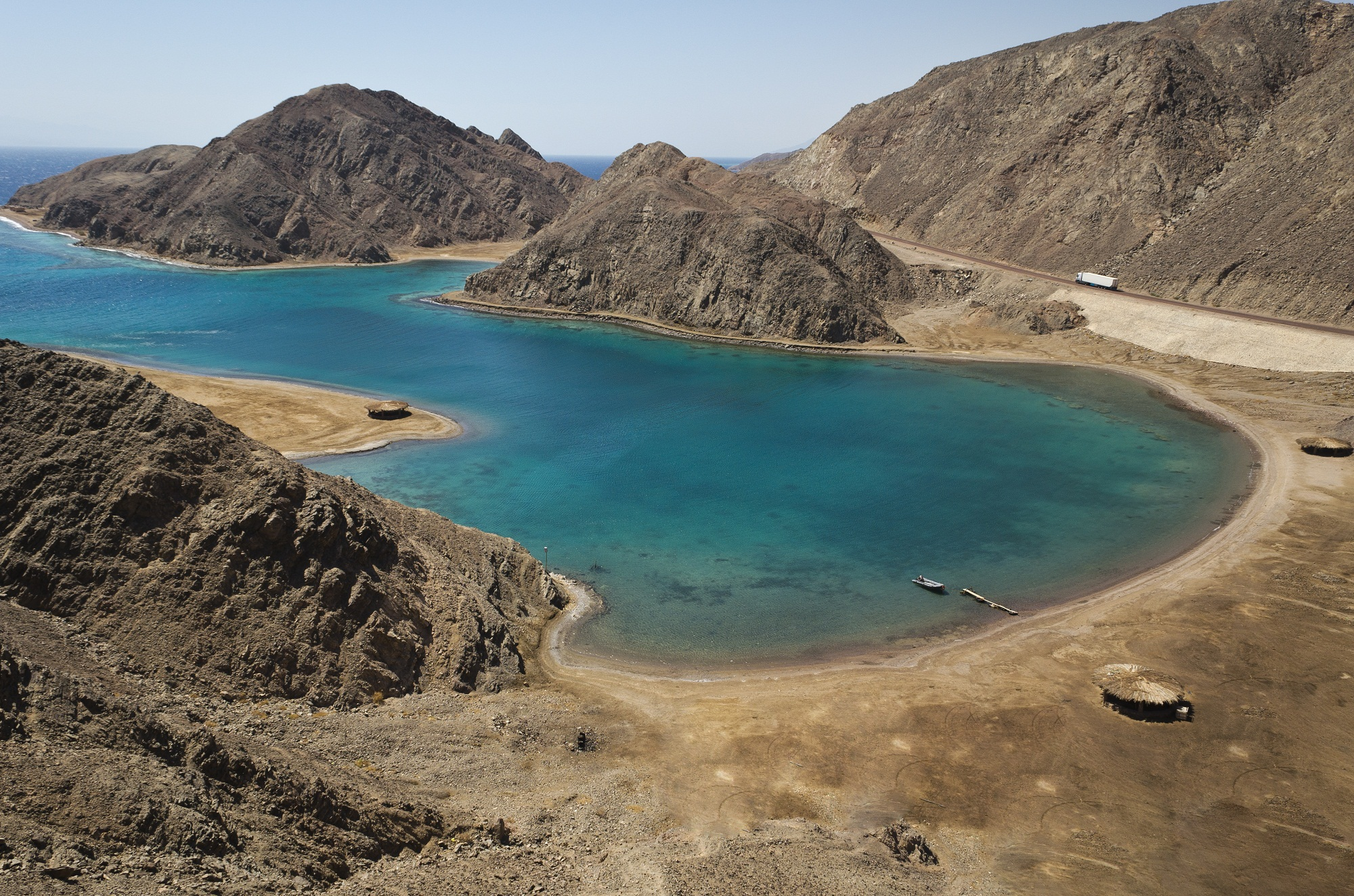
Fjord Bay, a rare coastal shark breeding site, has been preserved and closed to tourists

Located just southwest of Taba is a 3,590 km^{2} (1,386 sq mi) protected area, including geological formations such as caves, a string of valleys, and mountainous passages. There are also some natural springs in the area. The area has 25 species of mammals, 50 species of rare birds, and 24 species of reptiles.

== Transportation ==
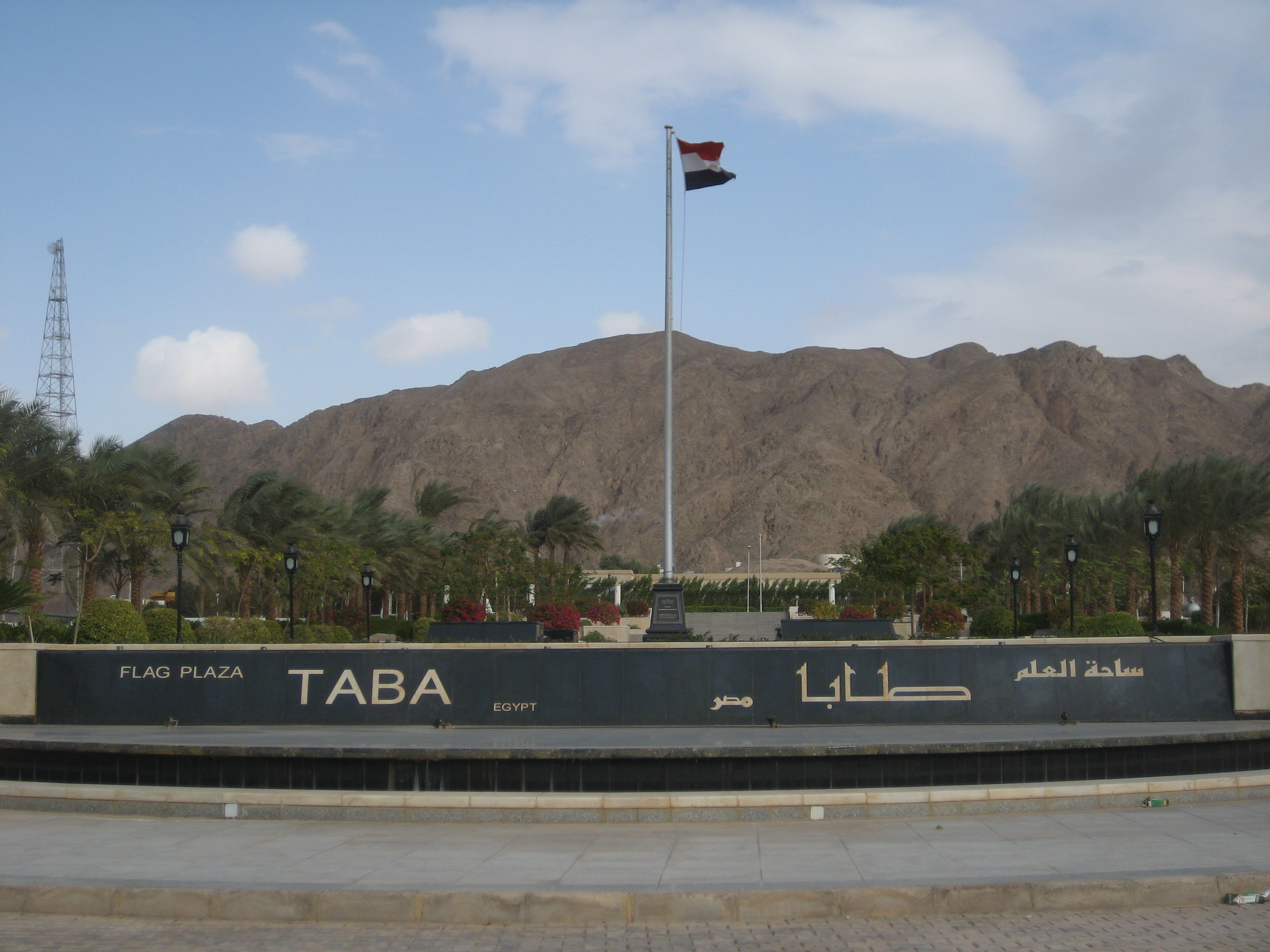
Flag Plaza Square, Taba

Since Taba existed only as a small Bedouin village, there was never any real transportation infrastructure. In 2000, El Nakb Airport, located on the Sinai plateau some 35 kilometres (22 miles) from Taba, was upgraded and renamed the Taba International Airport (IATA: TCP, ICAO: HETB), and now handles half a dozen charter flights a week from the UK as well as weekly charter flights from Belgium, Russia, Denmark, and the Netherlands. Some tourists enter via the Taba Border Crossing and a marina has been built in the new Taba Heights development, some 20 km (12 miles) south of Taba, and which has frequent ferry sailings to Aqaba in Jordan, although these are restricted to tourists on organised tours.

== Gallery ==
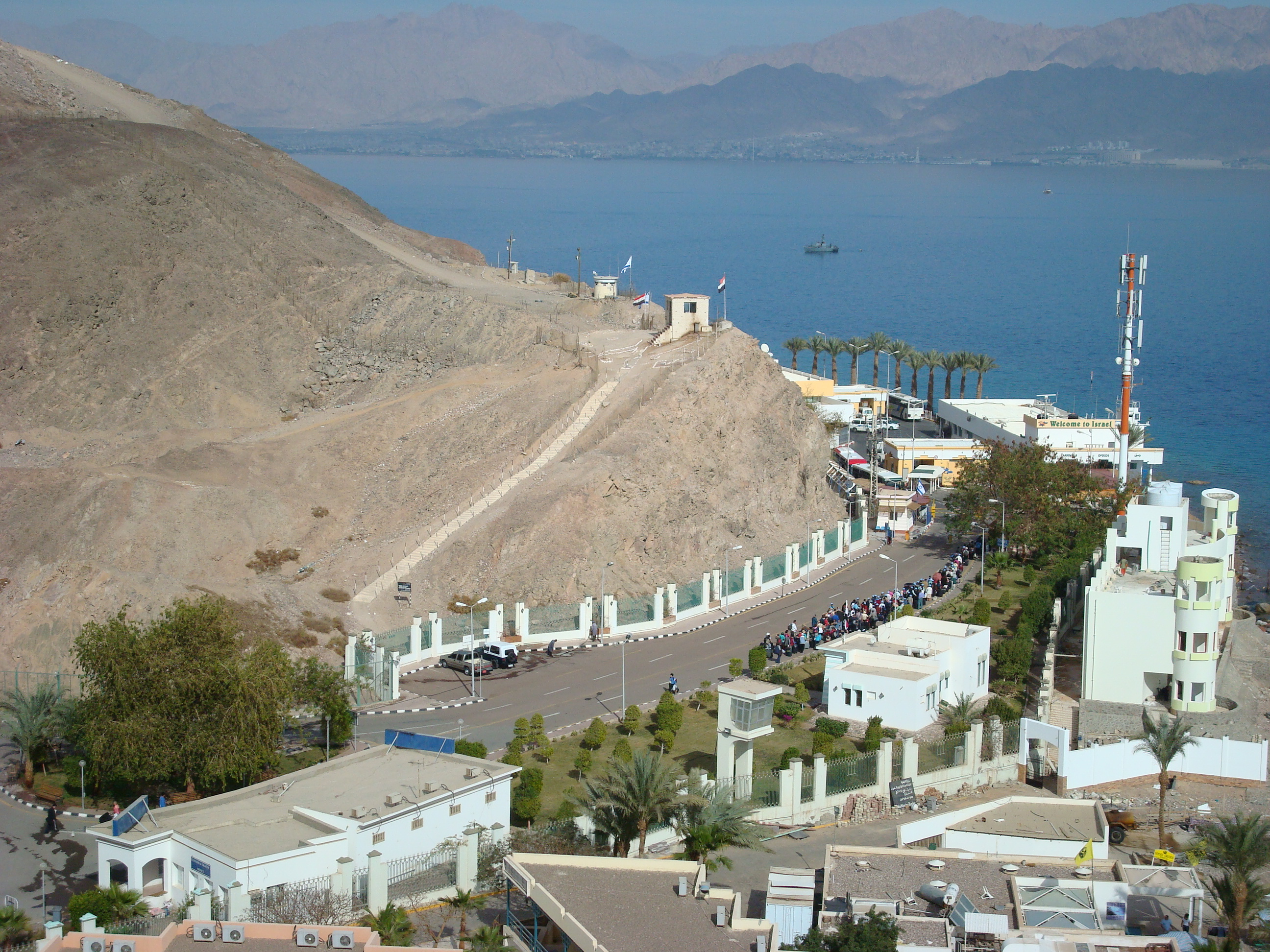
Taba Border Crossing

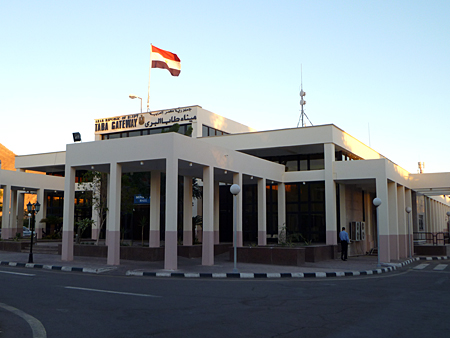
Taba Border Crossing (December 2010)

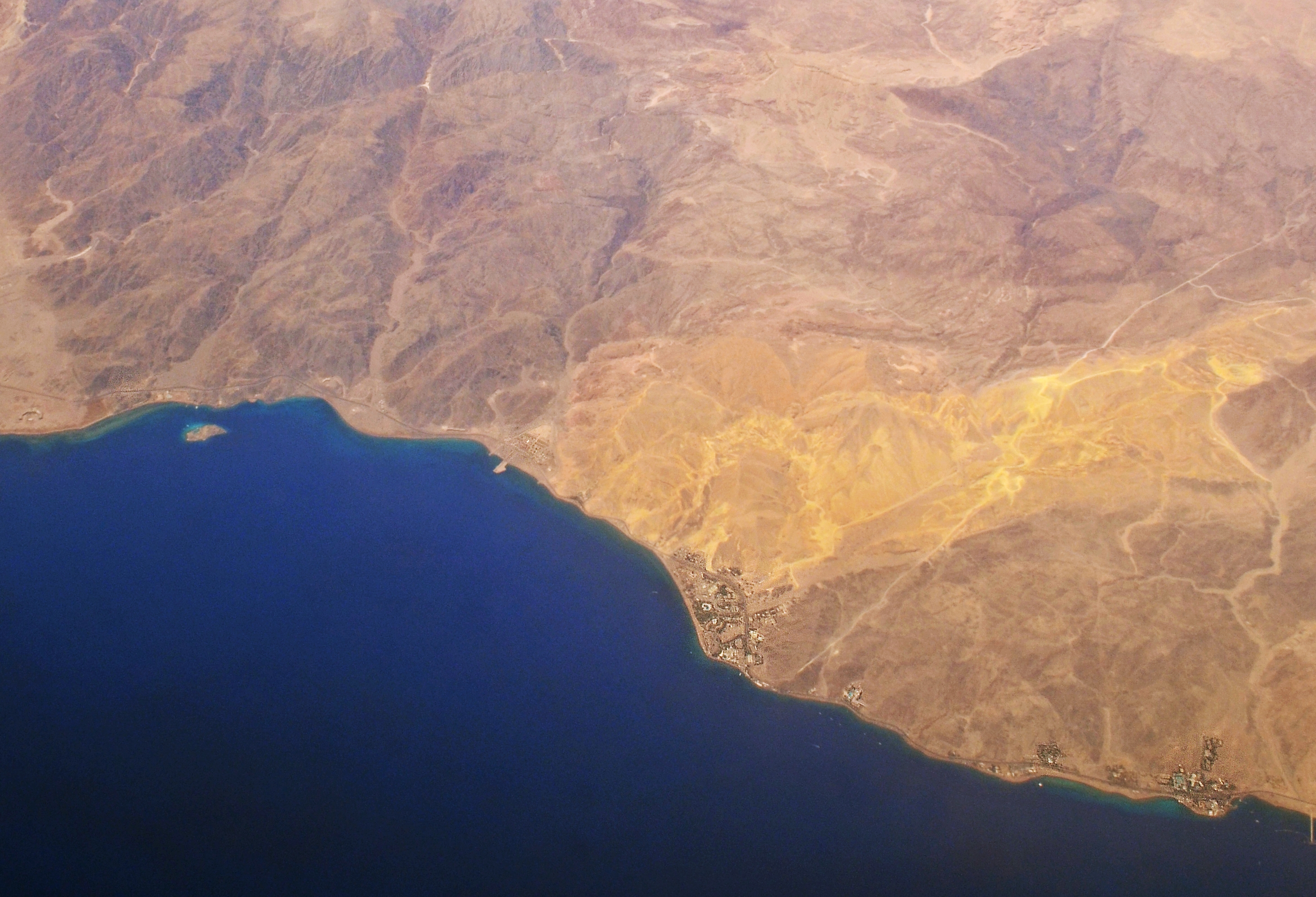
Taba from Space

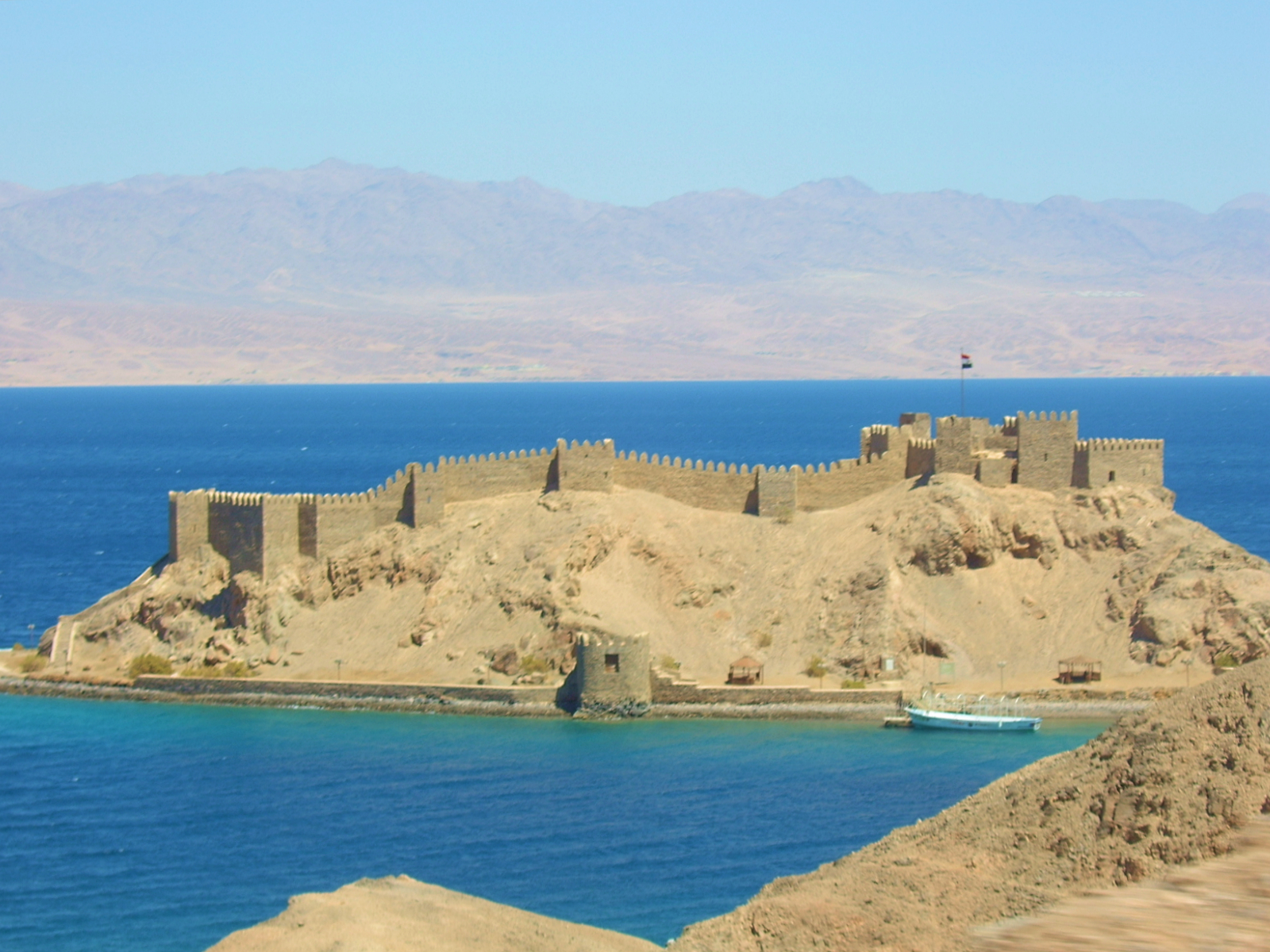
Saladin's Citadel

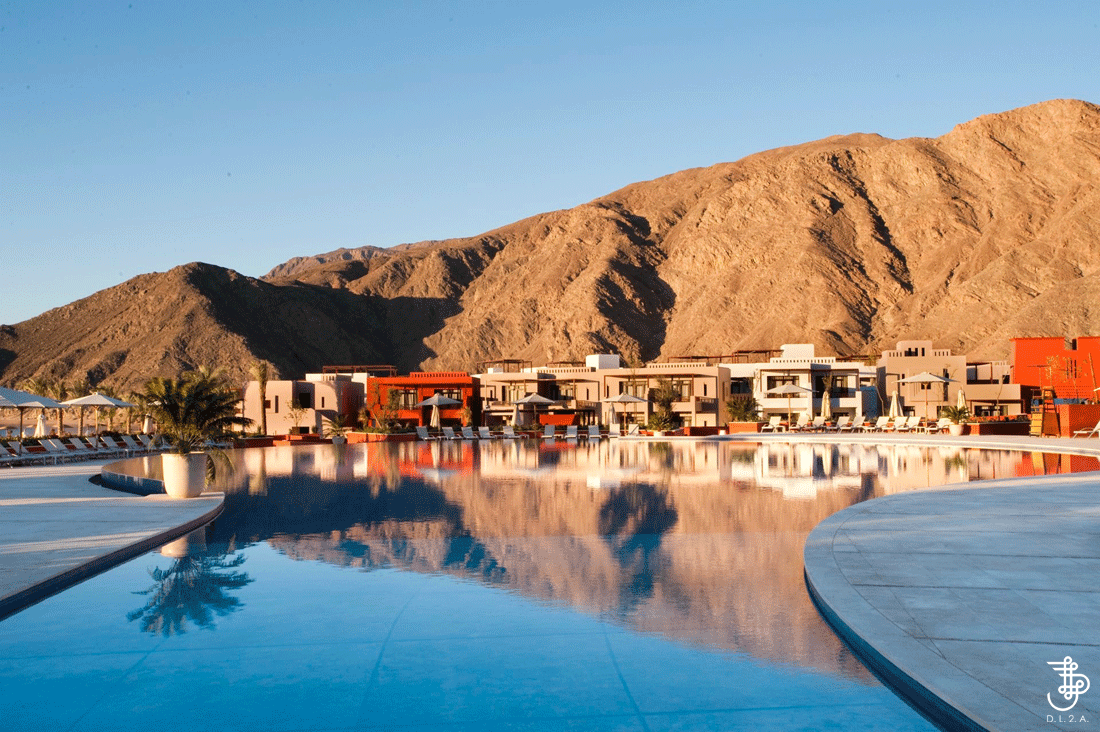
Taba Sinai Bay

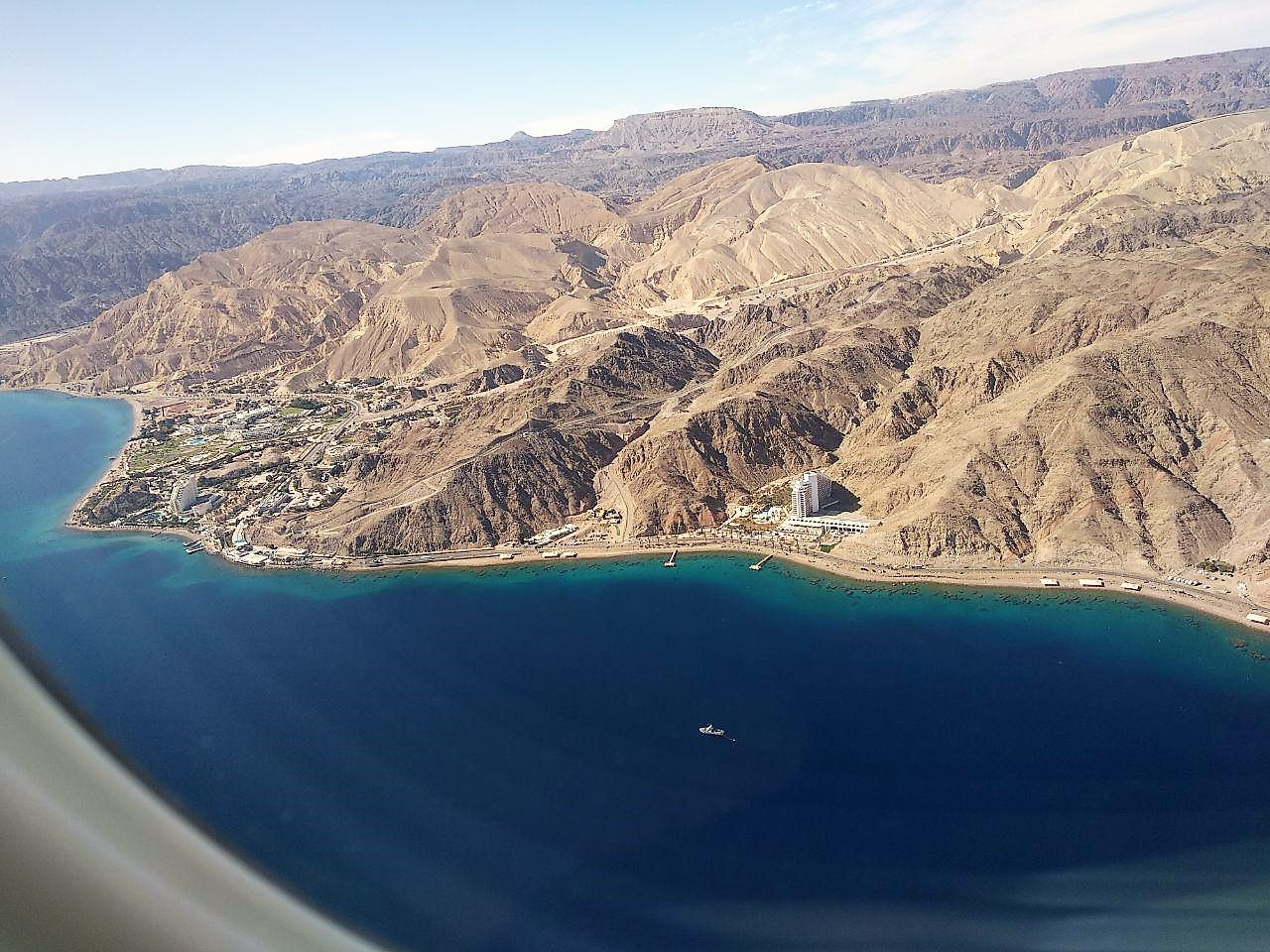
Taba Aerial photo

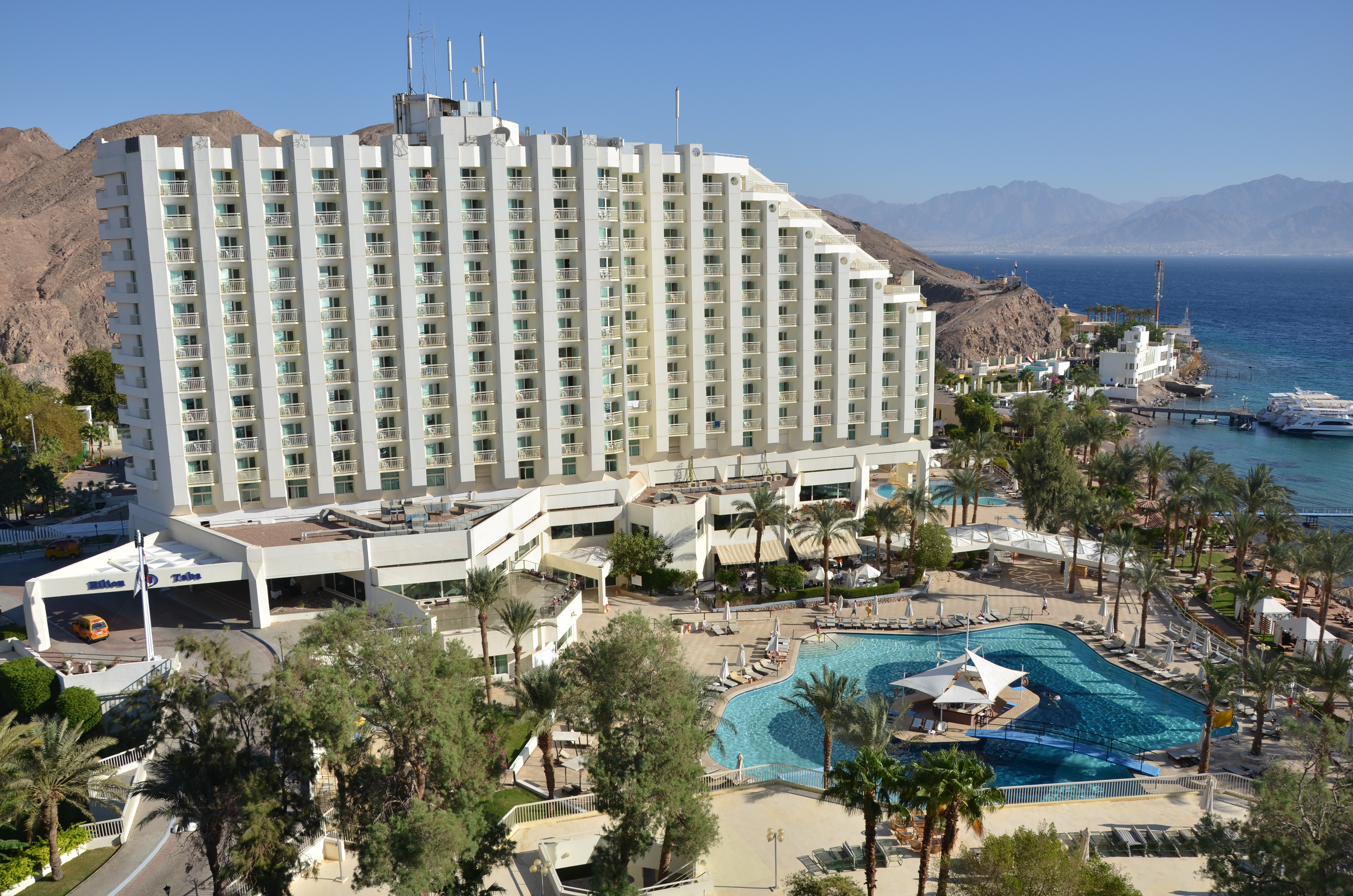
Hilton Taba

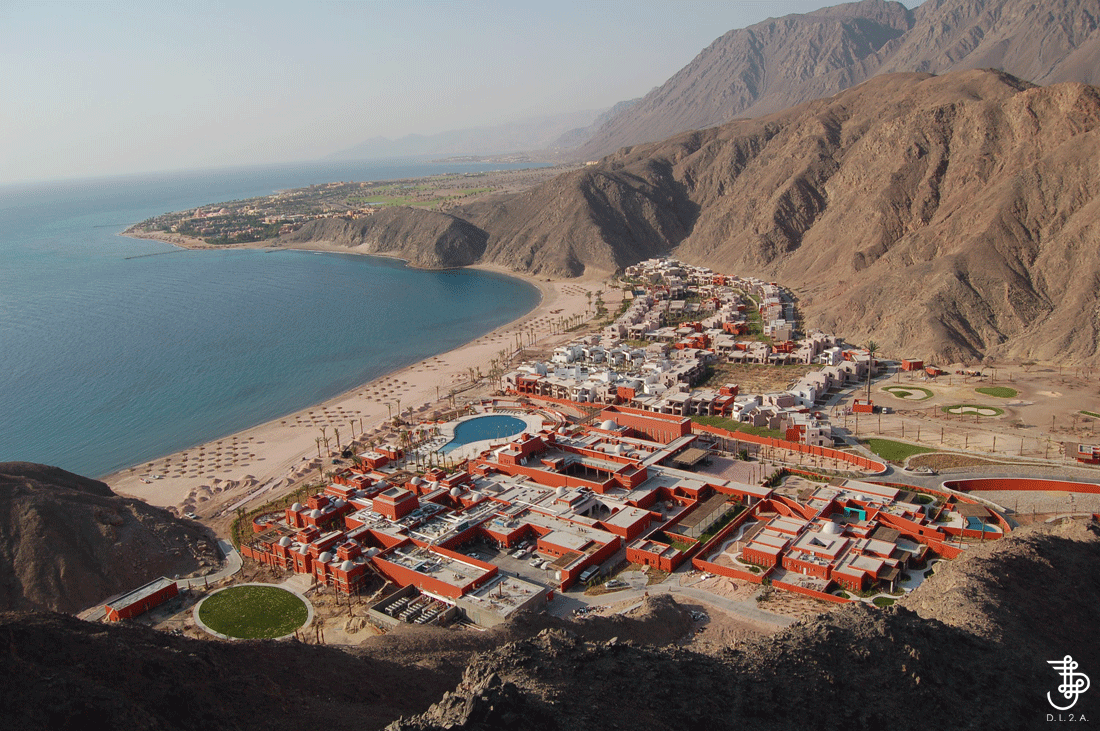
Club Méditerranée Taba

== See also ==
- Cultural tourism in Egypt
- Ras Muhammad National Park
- Taba Summit
