= Tina, West Virginia =

- Former settlement
- Location within West Virginia
- Coordinates: 37°50′07″N 80°51′54″W
- Country: United States
- State: West Virginia
- County: Summers
- Elevation: 1,936 ft (590 m)
- GNIS feature ID: 1556985

Tina is a former settlement in Summers County, West Virginia, United States. Tina was located northeast of Claypool and appeared on maps as late as 1912.
