= Taba Border Crossing =

Border crossing between Eilat, in Israel, and Taba, in Egypt

Taba Crossing معبر طابا מעבר מנחם בגין
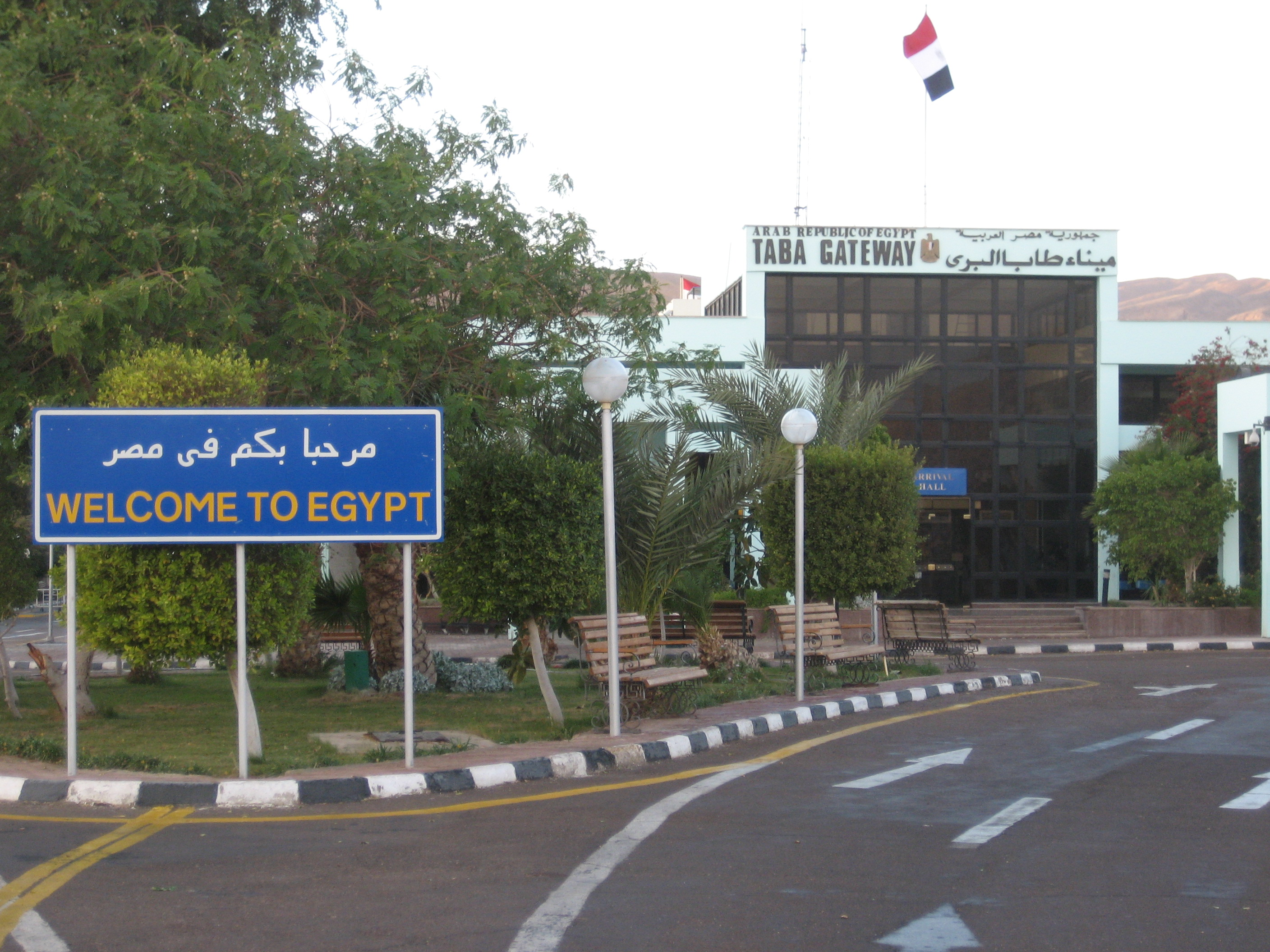
- The Egyptian border terminal
- Coordinates: 29°29′27″N 34°54′10″E
- Carries: Pedestrians, Vehicles, Containers
- Crosses: Border between Egypt and Israel
- Locale: Taba, Egypt; Eilat, Israel
- Official name: Taba Border Crossing מעבר מנחם בגין معبر طابا
- Maintained by: Arab Republic of Egypt; Israel Airports Authority

Characteristics
- Total length: 200 m (Israeli side)
- Width: 45 m (Israeli side)

History
- Opened: 26 April 1982

Statistics
- Daily traffic: 2,147 pedestrians in 2005; 74 vehicles in 2005
- Toll: E£405 (Inbound Egypt) ₪106 (Outbound Israel)

Location
- Interactive map of Taba Crossing

The Taba Border Crossing (Arabic: معبر طابا, Hebrew: מעבר טאבה), also known in Israel as the Menachem Begin Crossing (Hebrew: מעבר מנחם בגין), is an international border crossing between Taba, in Egypt, and Eilat, in Israel. The Taba Border Crossing is the southernmost point in Israel.

== History ==
Opened on April 26, 1982, it is currently the only entry/exit point between the two countries that handles tourists. The site is at the bottom of Mount Tallul and was close to Raffi Nelson's Nelson Village and the Sonesta Hotel which both closed due to the handing over of the Sinai to Egyptian control in exchange for normalization of relations. Under terms of the deal, Israelis would be able to visit the Red Sea coast from Taba to Sharm el-Sheikh (and Saint Catherine's Monastery) visa free for visits up to fourteen days. In 1999, the terminal handled a record amount of 1,038,828 tourists and 89,422 vehicles.

The terminal is open 24 hours a day, every day of the year except for the holidays of Eid ul-Adha and Yom Kippur.

In February 2014, a coach taking tourists to Saint Catherine's Monastery in Sinai exploded in Taba shortly before crossing the border to Israel. Three South Korean nationals and one Egyptian national were killed, while 14 South Koreans were injured; the blast was blamed on terrorists.

In September 2016, the Israeli side of the crossing was renamed to "Menachem Begin Crossing" after the late prime minister, who signed the peace agreement between Israel and Egypt.

The crossing was closed for a week in April 2017 after bombing attacks at Coptic Orthodox churches in Egypt.

== Israeli terminal ==
The Israeli border terminal was opened in September 1995 at a cost of US $3 million.

=== Services within the terminal ===
- Drive in stations for those traveling by car
- Change Place stand offering a money exchange
- James Richardson duty-free shop
- Cafeteria

=== Transportation to and from the terminal ===
The Israeli border terminal can be reached from within Israel via Egged bus number 15 from Eilat's central bus station. Privately owned Israeli cars may cross through the terminal and stay in the confines of the Egyptian border terminal (this includes the parking lots of the Hilton Taba and Mövenpick Taba Resort); further travel into the Sinai is possible after change of license plates, registration and the payment of a tax.

Israeli rental cars are not allowed to cross the border.

=== Passage fee ===
All travelers to Egypt must pay a border-crossing fee before leaving Israel. The border-crossing fee is NIS 109 (June 2023) per traveler. The fee is quoted in NIS and is updated once a year (on January 1) linked to the Consumer Price Index. An additional service charge of 6 NIS (per payment, not per traveler) is added if the fee is paid on-site, and not online.

The border fee is waived if travelling no further than 1 km (0.62 mi) from the border. This means travelers to the Mövenpick Resort, Hilton Taba Resort Hotel, and Radisson Blue Resort Taba are exempt from any fees, but a printed reservation to the hotel must be shown at the border, otherwise the full fee is required.

== Egyptian Terminal ==
=== Visa ===
Travelers will get a stamp on arrival allowing entry into the Sinai Peninsula for up to 14 days. With this stamp, travelers can travel as far as Sharm El Sheikh including St Catherine Monastery and visit Ras Mohamed Nature Reserve. There is no cost involved to get the stamp. Travel beyond into the rest of Egypt requires an Egyptian Visa that will need to be obtained in advance.

=== Passage fee ===
The Taba border tariff is E£405, payable in cash, only if travelling beyond the immediate Taba resort area. There is no fee when crossing back from Taba to Eilat.

== See also ==
- Eilat Airport
- Eilat Ashkelon Pipeline Company
- Eilot (kibbutz)
- Ezion-Geber
- Operation Uvda
- Ovda Airport
- Port of Eilat
- Yotvata Airfield

== Gallery ==
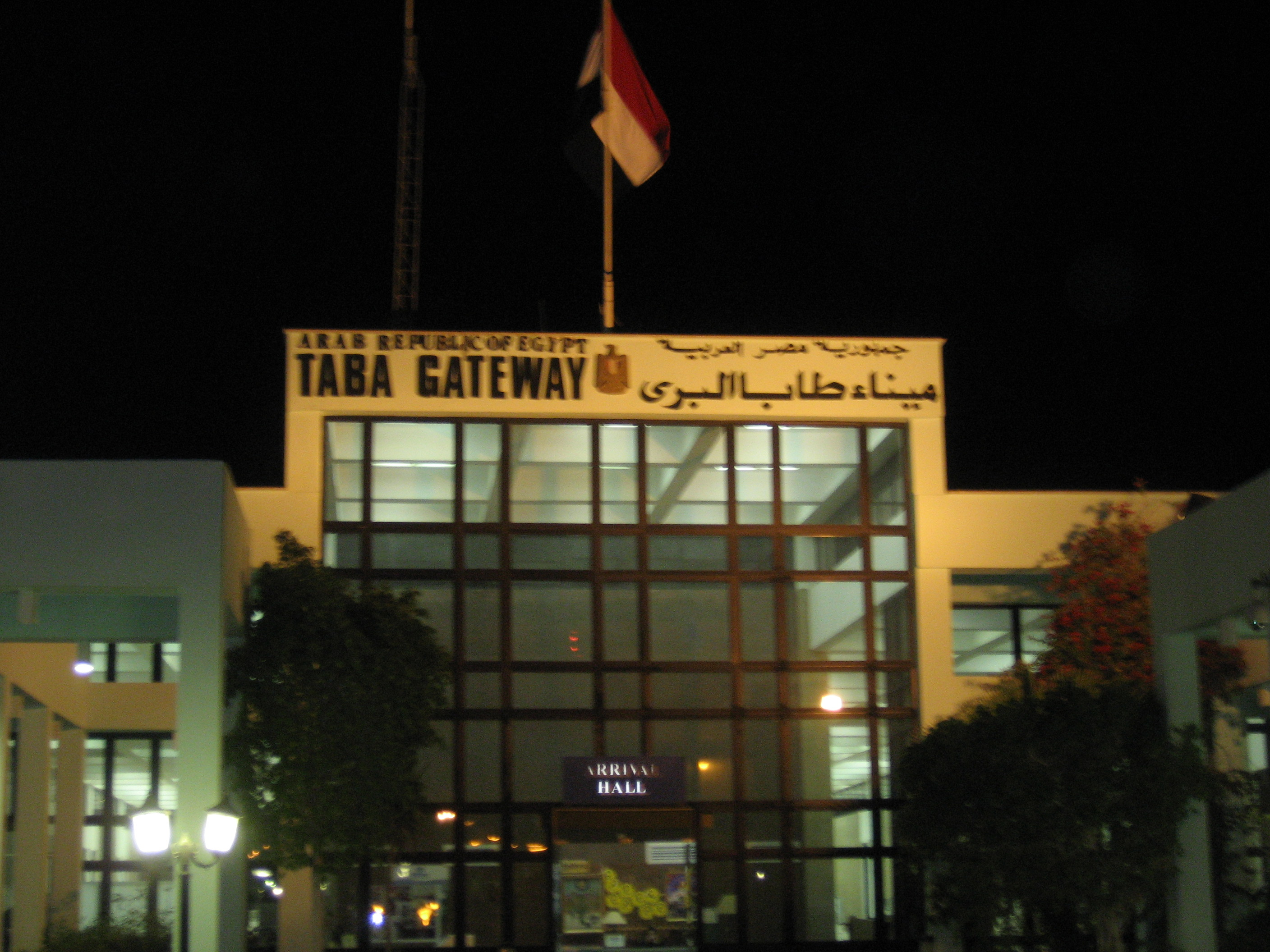
The Egyptian arrivals hall at night.

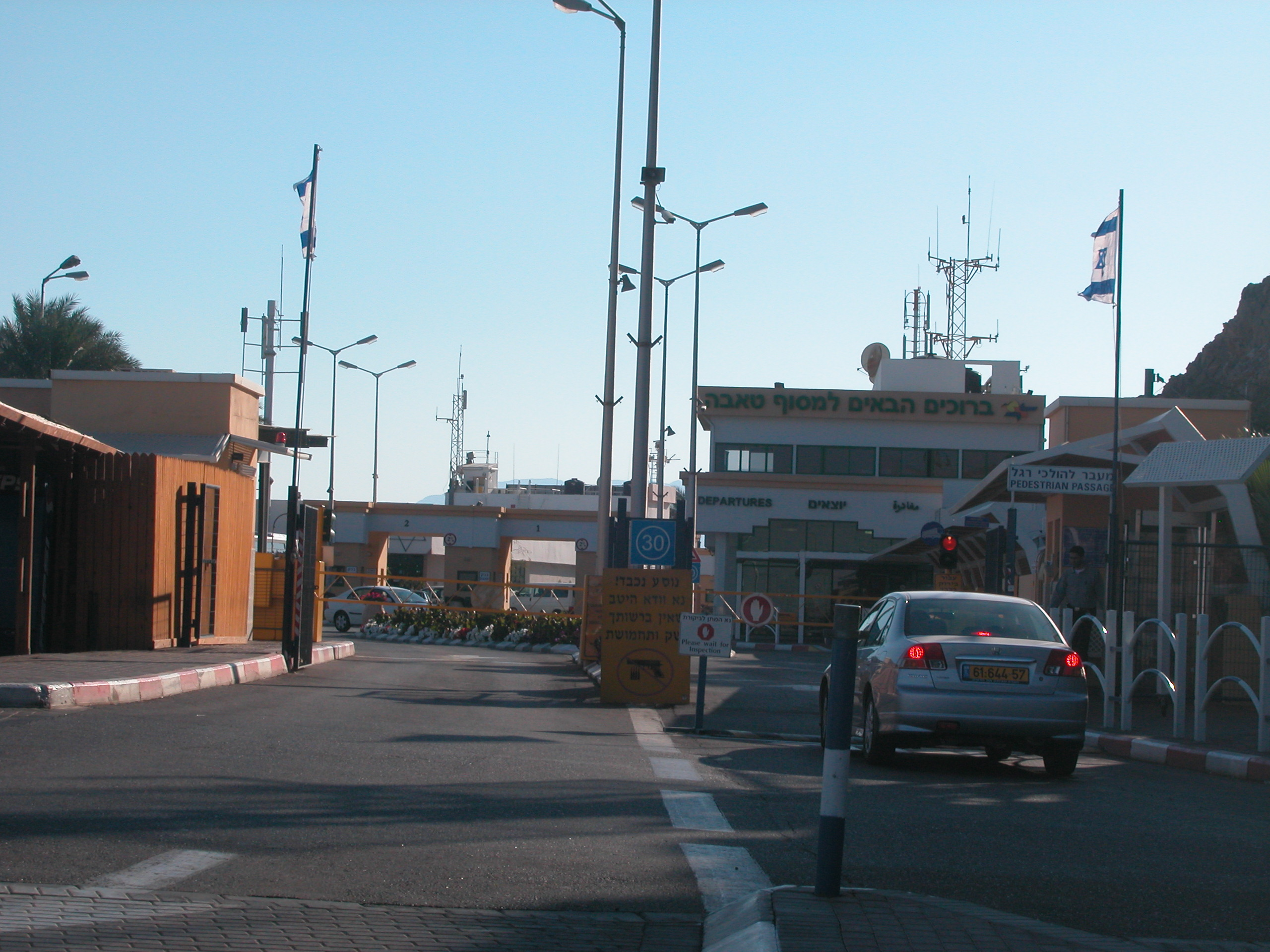
The entrance to the Israeli terminal from Eilat, Israel.

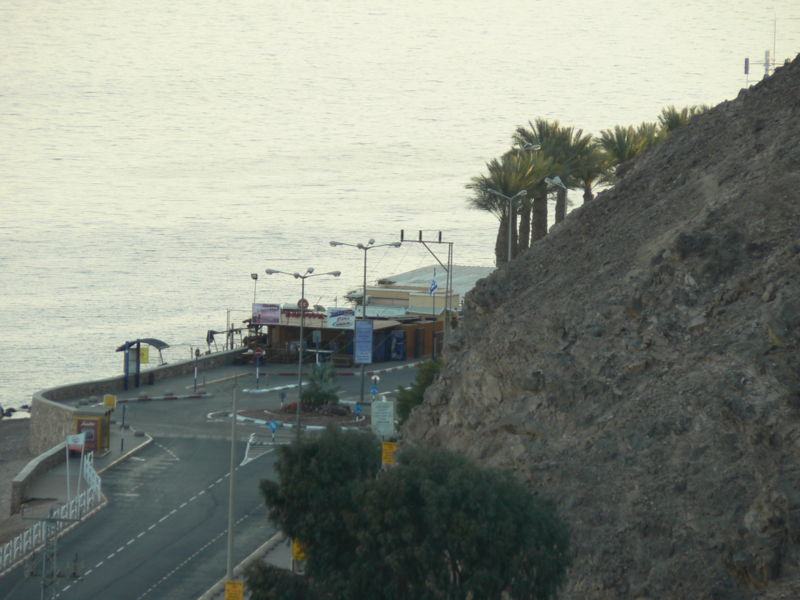
View of entrance to the Israeli terminal from Mount Tallul.

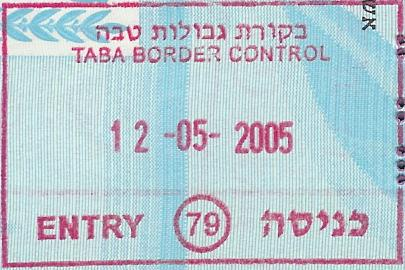
Entry stamp to Israel issued at Taba in an Israeli passport.

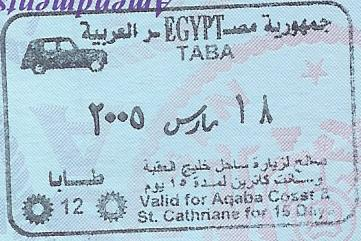
Entry stamp to Egypt issued at Eilat in a United States passport.

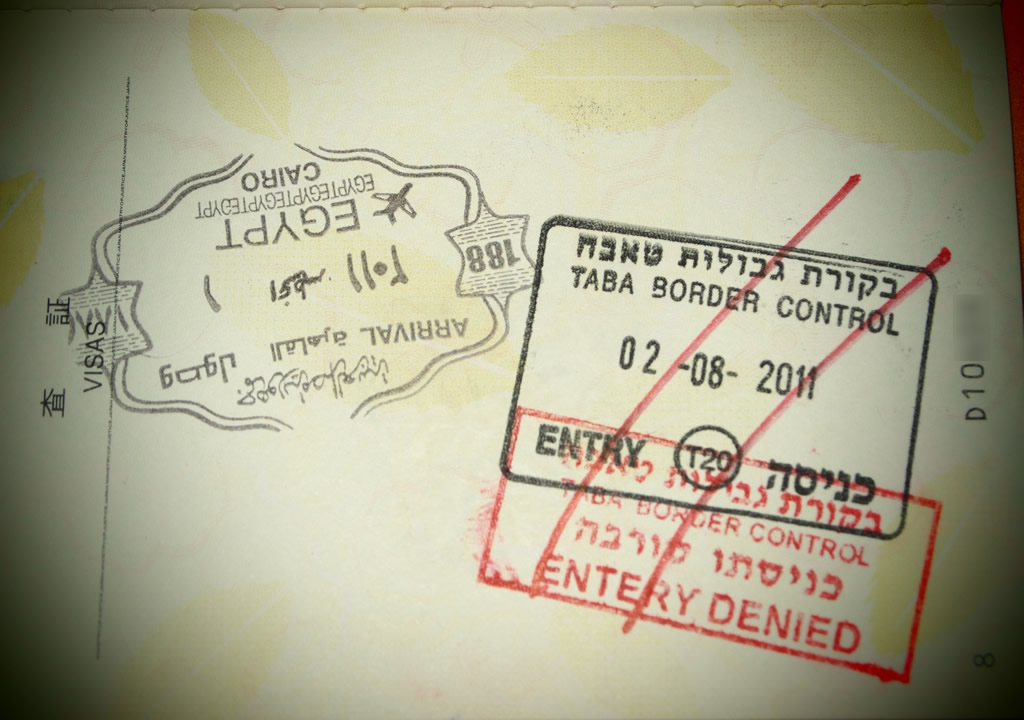
An Israeli "entery [sic] denied" stamp from the Taba Border Crossing, with a 2005 stamp from the same crossing with a different spelling
