= Anacrusis guttula =

Scientific classification
- Domain: Eukaryota
- Kingdom: Animalia
- Phylum: Arthropoda
- Class: Insecta
- Order: Lepidoptera
- Family: Tortricidae
- Genus: Anacrusis
- Species: A. guttula

Binomial name
- Anacrusis guttula Razowski & Wojtusiak, 2010

Species of moth

Anacrusis guttula is a species of moth of the family Tortricidae. It is found in Napo Province, Ecuador.

The wingspan is about 28 mm for males and 32 mm for females.

== Etymology ==
The species name is derived from Greek guttula (meaning small droplet).
