= Taba, Solomon Islands =

Taba
- Village
- Location in Guadalcanal
- Coordinates: 9°15′51″S 159°40′10″E
- Country: Solomon Islands
- Province: Guadalcanal
- Island: Guadalcanal
- Time zone: UTC+11 (UTC)

Taba is a village on the northwest coast of Guadalcanal, Solomon Islands. It is located 42.8 kilometres (26.6 mi) by road northwest of Honiara. It lies on Coughlin Bay.
