= 1996 Cairo shooting =

Terrorist incident in Cairo, Egypt

At 7am on 18 April 1996, four Islamists carried out a mass shooting against a group of 88 Greek tourists outside the Europa Hotel in Cairo, Egypt. Eighteen people were killed: 17 Greek tourists and one Egyptian. The victims were outside the hotel, about to board a bus to Alexandria. Al-Jama'a al-Islamiyya claimed responsibility for the attack, saying that they thought the tourists were Israelis.

== Aftermath ==
In the attack’s immediate aftermath, Egyptian security forces launched a sweeping operation to identify and apprehend the perpetrators. According to Amnesty International, the four Islamist gunmen were later located and killed by security forces in Upper Egypt, amid a larger crackdown on militants believed to be responsible for targeting tourists in retaliation for Israeli actions in Lebanon.

This incident intensified pressure on the Egyptian government to protect its tourism industry, a vital sector already weakened by a series of attacks throughout the early 1990s; including more than 30 assaults on tourist buses, trains, and cruisers between 1992 and early 1996 that resulted in around a dozen deaths. The tourism sector was further destabilized later in 1997 by the Luxor massacre, another attack attributed to al-Jama’a al-Islamiyya that killed 62 people, most tourists.

== See also ==
- List of Islamist terrorist attacks
- Terrorism and tourism in Egypt
- Terrorism in Egypt
