= Terrorism and tourism in Egypt =

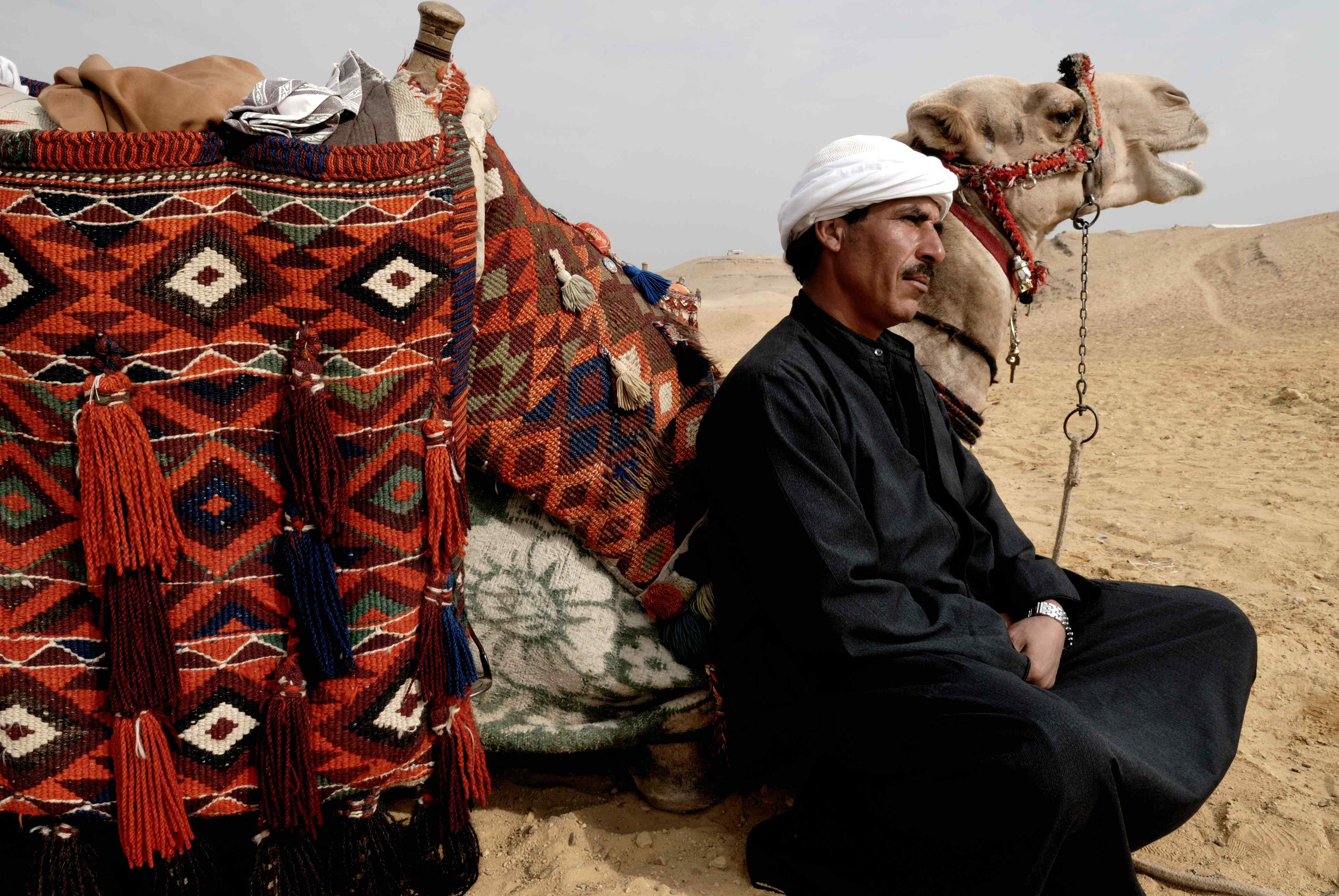
Egyptian man in the desert with camel

Terrorism and tourism in Egypt is when terrorist attacks are specifically aimed at Egypt's tourists. These attacks often end in fatalities and injuries and have an immediate and sometimes lasting effect on the industry. Attacks take many forms; blowing up an airplane carrying tourists, drive-by shootings of tourists, knife attacks on tourists and suicide bombings in a location where tourists are congregated. On the timeline of these events, the 1997 Luxor Massacre stands out as the worst in the history of attacks on tourists in Egypt.

Attacks carried out by different extremists have an immediate effect on tourism, an important part of Egypt's economy. So while there is a history of persecution and terrorism aimed at Egypt's Coptic Christians and terrorism is directed at Egypt's security and government officials, terrorism targeting tourists affects the citizens of other countries. Tourism agencies note that when an attack occurs against tourists, Egypt loses tourism dollars to other countries such as China, India or Morocco.

In the first six months of 2018, tourism revenue had increased by 71% to $4.8 billion amid an upsurge of visitors. More than 5 million tourists visited, a jump of 41%, as compared to same time frame in 2017.

After almost two years without an attack targeting tourists, a bomb targeting tourists was planted near a bus with Vietnamese tourists, killing four, on 28 of December, 2018.

== Background ==
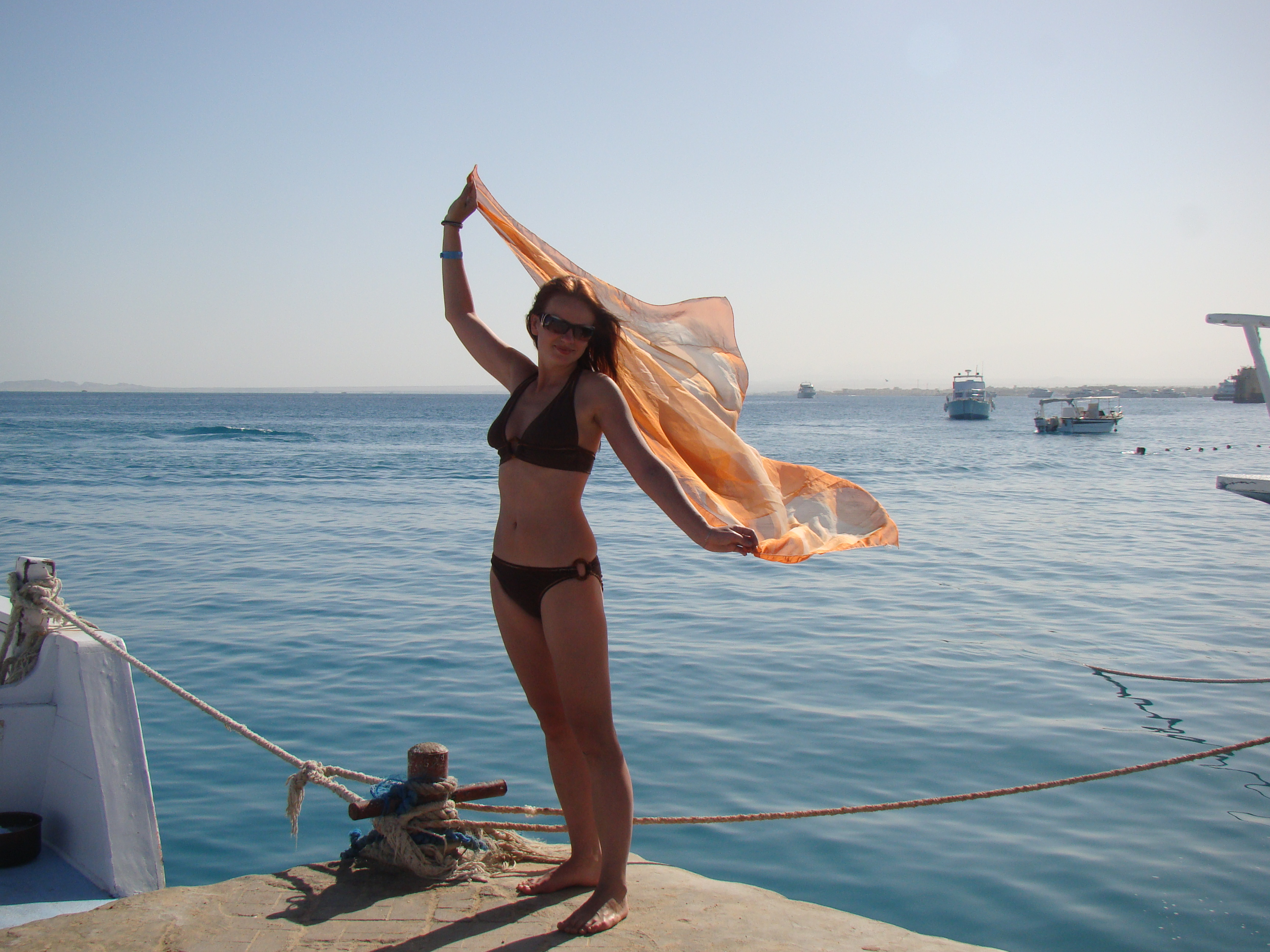
Tourist on the Red Sea Riviera

The Egyptian tourism industry is one of the most important sectors of Egypt's economy, in terms of employment and foreign currency, and at times it has been as much as 1% of the world tourism market. The many constituents of tourism include historical attractions, especially in Cairo, Luxor and Aswan, but also beach and other sea activities, with foreign tourism actively encouraged since it is a major source of currency and investment. Political instability since January 2011 caused fluctuations in tourism income.

Around 1992, the new tactic of attacking tourists was noted by then President Mubarak who addressed the parliament on the grave effects these growing number of attacks by Muslim fundamentalist could have on Egypt's $2 billion tourism industry. Heightened security involved having to hire armed security guards to escort tour buses.

The connection between terrorism and tourism has been widely studied since the Luxor massacre in Egypt in 1997. The amount of news coverage a disaster gets and its effects on the tourism industry of that country has been studied by experts like Dr. Gabby Walters from the University of Queensland, Australia. Her predecessors at the university wrote the book Tourism in Turbulent Times.

Egypt's tourism industry was depressed from the Arab Spring and through the Egyptian revolution of 2011 and through the Egyptian crisis (2011–14). According to the Egyptian Ministry of Tourism, the number of tourists in the first quarter of 2017 had increased by almost 50% compared to the 1st quarter of 2016, but with hotel occupancy rates still only reaching 30% by 15 July 2017.

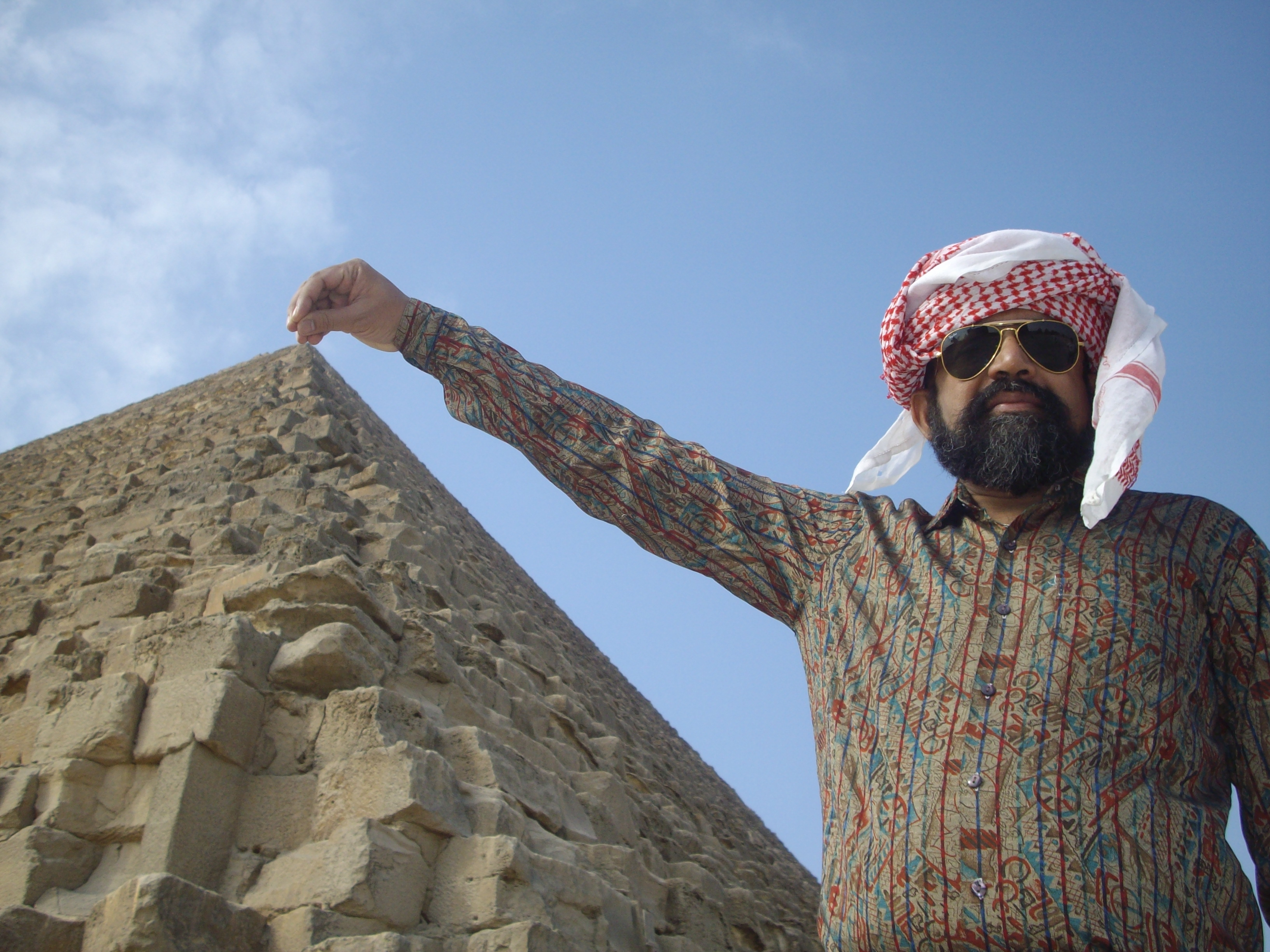
Photo at the Pyramids

The Egyptian Pyramids attract millions of visitors each year and tourists also visit places in Upper Egypt, the Egyptian museums, Coptic Cairo, ancient monasteries, Mount Sinai, the Red Sea Riviera, places with Islamic culture and Islamic art, and other places. Attacks cause countries to issue travel advisories, on steps to take for safety or countries issue travel warnings, asking tourists to avoid all but necessary travel to Egypt. As of August 2017 Canada had several travel warnings on Egypt but pointed out that the Sharm El Sheikh resort area was excluded from the warning.

The Grand Egyptian Museum is a multi-million dollar museum, at the Giza Plateau which opened in 2023, is a more recent investment into Egypt's Tourism Industry, and will require extensive security.

The National Museum of Egyptian Civilization, located in Al-Fustat made a soft opening in February. The museum features state-of-the-art security.

== Notable incidents and effects ==
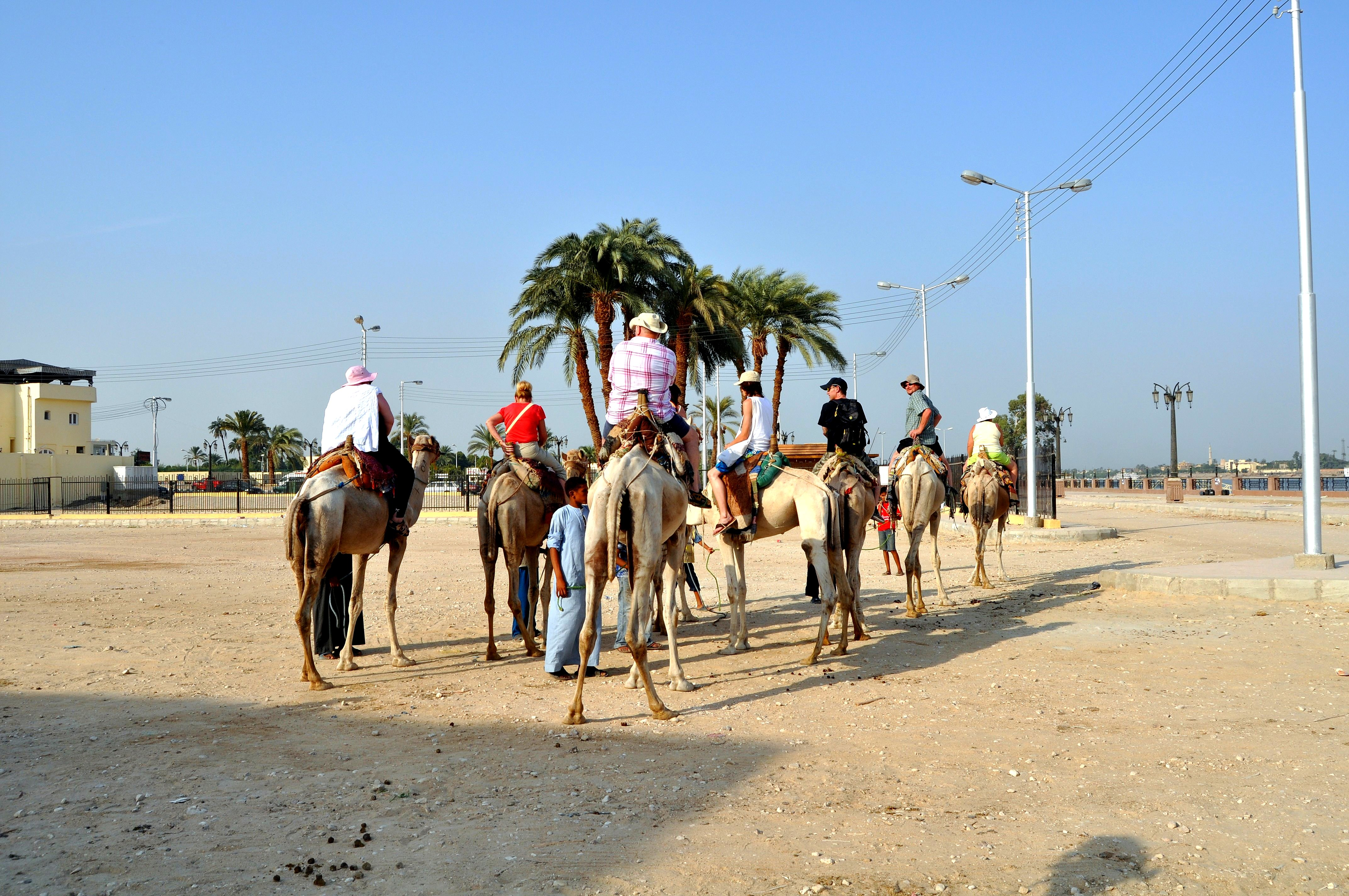
Luxor, Egypt

Researchers studying terrorism and tourism said that "Random acts of terrorism curtail travel activity until the public's memories of the publicized incidents fade. Persistent terrorism, however, can tarnish a destination's image of safety and attractiveness and jeopardize its entire tourism industry."

=== Pyramids of Giza ===
On 29 March 1993, al-Jama`a al-Islamiya caused an explosion at the Pyramid of Khafre. On 8 June 1993, a bomb lobbed at a tour bus in Giza's Pyramid Rock, killed foreign tourists and Egyptians. In late 1993, American and French tourists were shot dead at the Semiramis Hotel in Cairo.

In 1996, 18 Greek tourists who had finished touring Jerusalem and were in Egypt, near the Europa Hotel in Cairo, were killed and security nearby were not prepared (armed) to protect them.

On 28 December 2018, a bomb targeting tourists was planted near a bus with Vietnamese tourists, killing four.

=== Upper Egypt ===
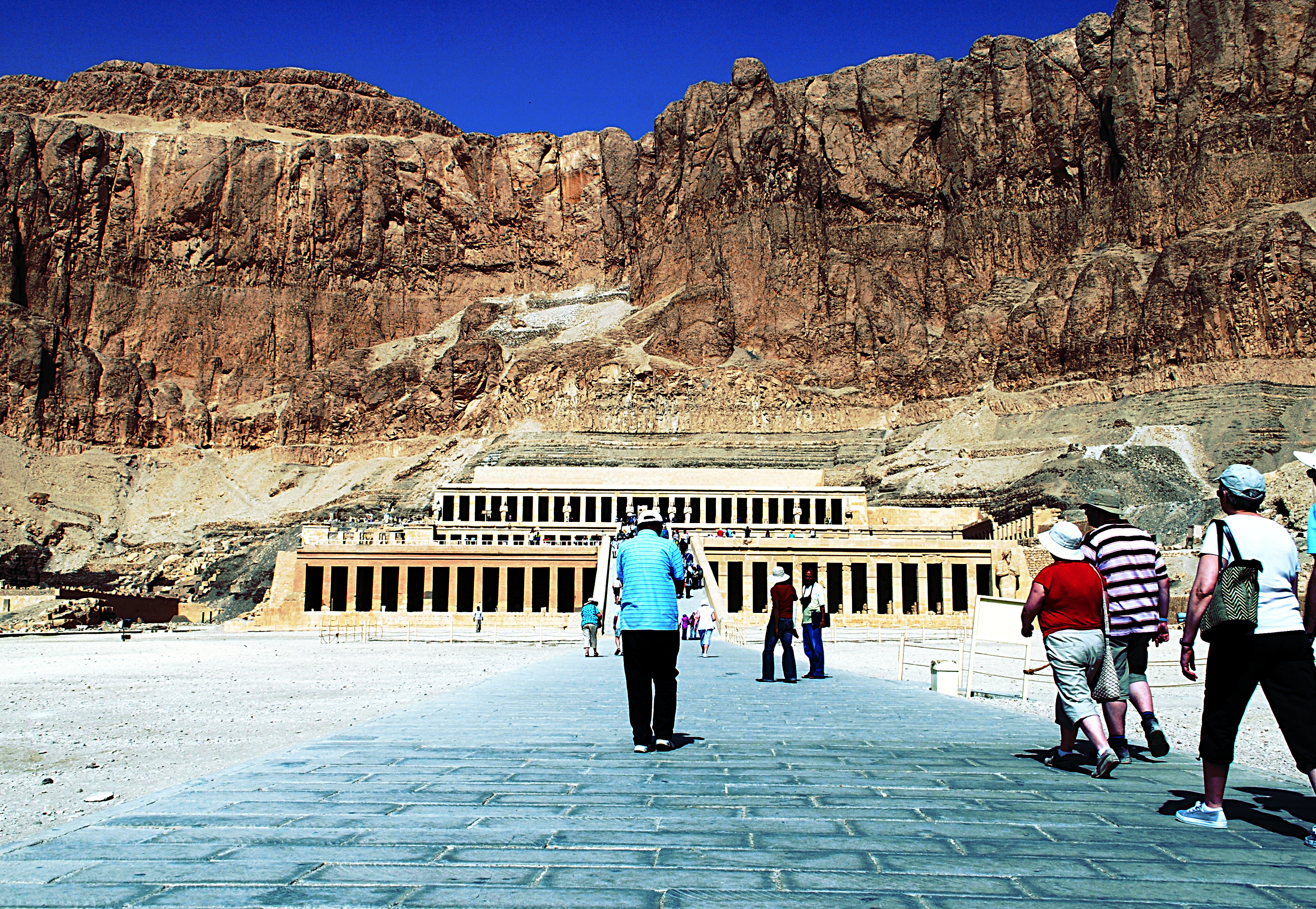
Location of the Luxor massacre

62 people, mostly tourists, were killed and 26 were injured during the Luxor massacre on 17 November 1997. The weapons of choice were firearms and knives. Hotels eliminated 70% of their workforce and "...European and Japanese tourism companies canceled their tours to Egypt" after the attack.

In 2014 an Egyptian citizen from Upper Egypt lamented that what had "provided one of the most important sources of income besides farming has dried out".

=== Sinai Peninsula and North coast ===
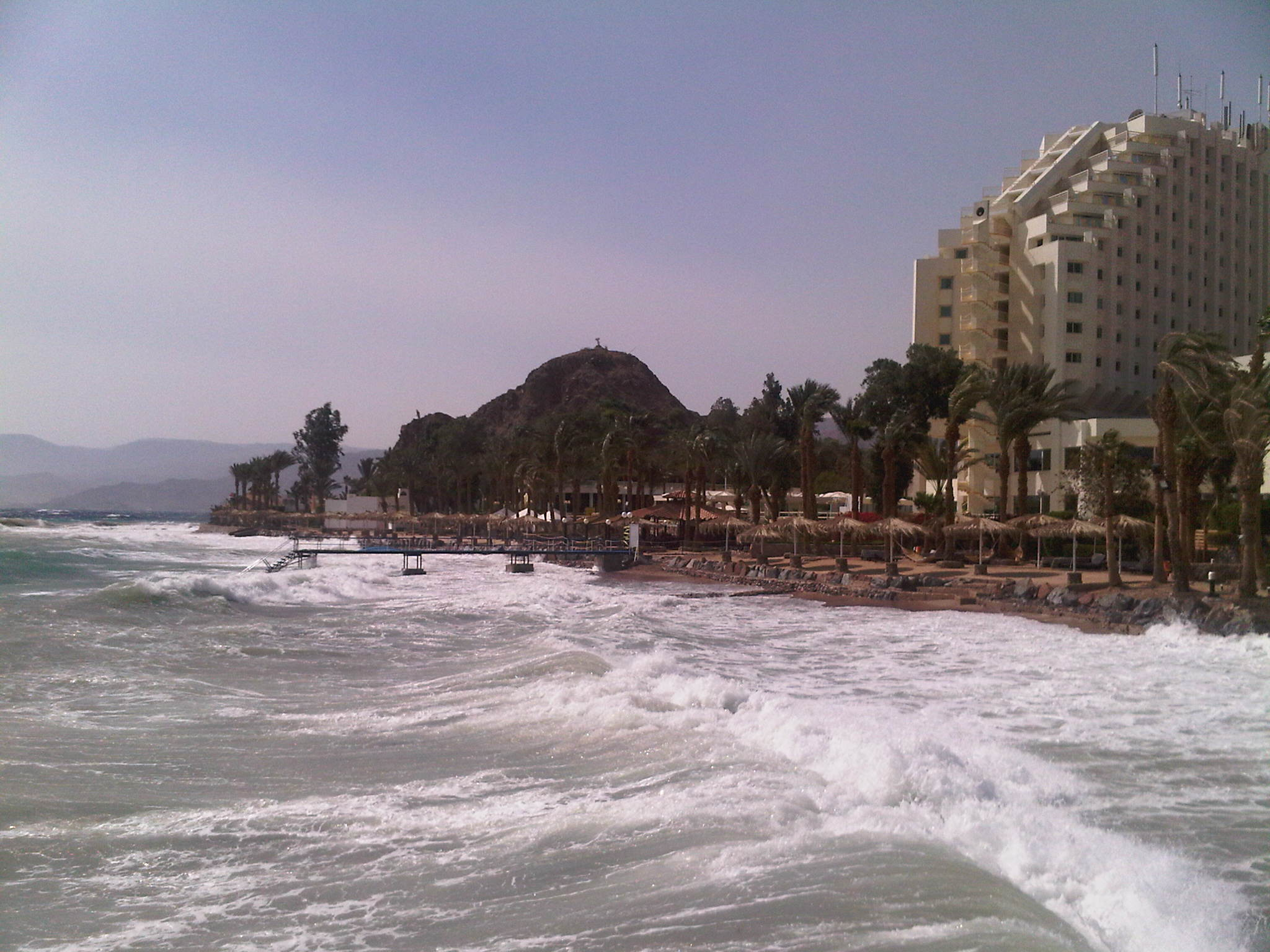
Hilton Hotel - Taba, Egypt

The Red Sea Riviera, Egypt's eastern coastline along the Red Sea, is a popular destination spot.

In 2004, tourism from Israel all but stopped after three incidents. Before 2004, "400,000 Israelis visited the peninsula each year. Over a decade later, the number is a trickle."

On 2 May 2014, a bomb on a tour bus in Sharm El Sheikh detonated, killing one and injuring four others.

Reuters reported that Sinai's militants had turned their attention from security forces to tourists or soft targets. The explosion was caught on camera when on 16 February 2014, four civilians including three South Korean tourists were killed in what is known as the 2014 Taba bus bombing. The bomber detonated his device on a tour bus carrying more than 30 members of a South Korean church group. They had traveled from Cairo to Saint Catherine's Monastery in the Sinai Peninsula. The bus was waiting to cross into Israel when the explosion occurred. The South Korean tourists belonged to the Jincheon Jungang Presbyterian Church. They had reportedly "saved for years to visit Biblical sites on the 60th anniversary of their church". After this attack, Britons were warned not to travel to South Sinai, with an official government travel warning.

By 2015, conditions had deteriorated to the point where Israeli tourists stopped going to the area for 18 months then resumed their visits, under heavy security in 2017.

When tourism was recovering, the downing of an airplane which had left Sharm El Sheikh airport, with Russian tourists on 31 October 2015, sent shock waves through the industry again. The cause was a suspected bomb and speculation largely fell on an airport worker. Russia stopped all flights to Sharm-El-Sheik, until Russian officials inspected the airport and felt it met sufficient security standards. After the downing of the jet, "scared tourists" left the area, affecting the Bedouin population who worked in the tourism industry. Russian and Britain stopped all flights to Sharm El Sheikh. The drop in tourism was immense after the Russian tourists on the airplane were killed. Tourism income for Egypt dropped from $12 Billion in 2010 to almost half in 2016.

In 2016 tourists were attacked in Hurghada, resulting in the wounding of the two people. The city was targeted again in 2017, when a radicalized 29-year-old man stabbed several tourists at the resort area, killing two German and a Czech.

Whether targeting Egypt's Coptic Christians, tourists or both, an attack on 18 April 2017 near St. Catherine's Monastery, leaving a number of police officers injured came at a critical time, when Egypt was anxiously awaiting a decision on whether flights from Russia would resume. Even before the attack, Israel had asked its citizens not to go into the Sinai Peninsula.

In October 2023 two Israeli tourists were shot and killed at Pompey's Pillar (column), a site in Alexandria.

=== Western Desert ===
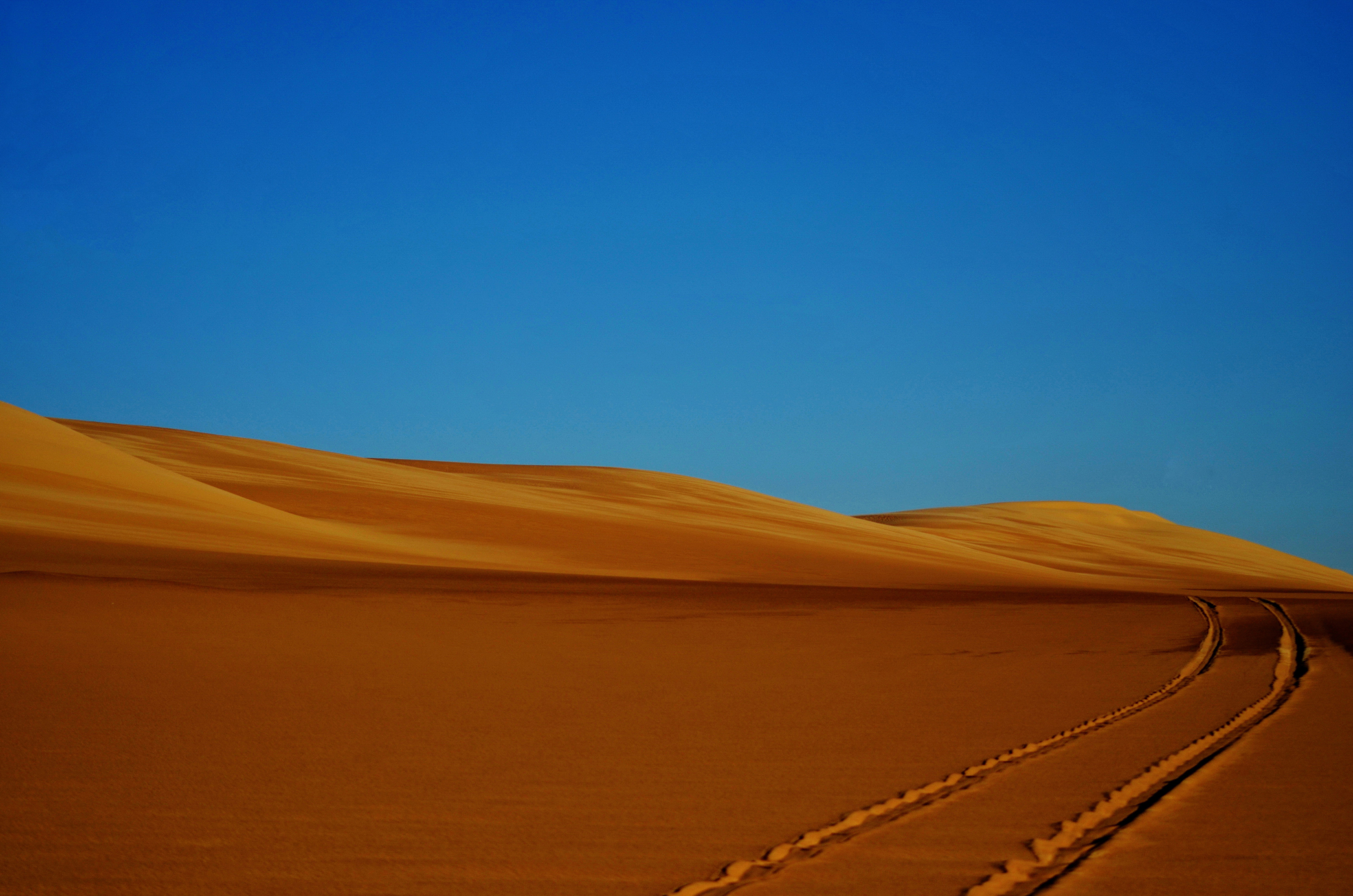
Western Desert

On 19 September 2008, tourists were held hostage by a number of men who took them into the Western desert and demanded ransom money. After ten days, a rescue mission resulted in the successful rescue of all the hostages and in the killing of one of the abductors.

== See also ==
- Timeline of the Sinai insurgency
- 2005 Sharm El Sheikh bombings
- April 2005 Cairo terrorist attacks
