= Semiramis InterContinental Hotel =

Complex located in Garden City, Cairo, Egypt

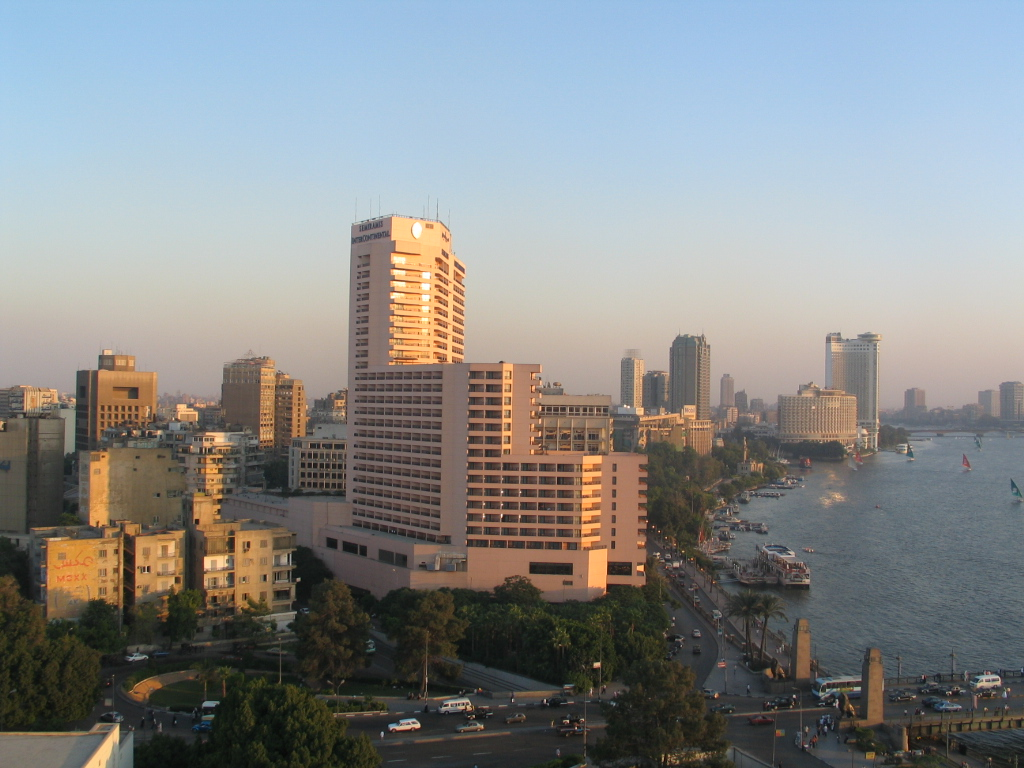
- Interactive map of the Semiramis InterContinental Hotel area

General information
- Status: Completed
- Type: Hotel
- Location: Cairo, Egypt
- Coordinates: 30.04301°N 31.23252°E
- Opening: 1988

Height
- Roof: 358 ft (109 m)

Technical details
- Floor count: 32

Other information
- Number of rooms: 726

Semiramis InterContinental Hotel is a skyscraper and hotel complex located in Garden City, Cairo, Egypt. The 32-story building completed in 1987, and houses an InterContinental hotel. The modernist building replaced the historic Semiramis hotel, and contains 726 rooms and suites, restaurants, bars, a cafe, outdoor Nile view terraces, a Spa, a gym, ballrooms, conference and meeting rooms, a shopping arcade and a casino.

== History ==
During the Second World War, the former Semiramis Hotel served as the headquarters of the 2nd Anti-Aircraft Brigade, whose task was to build up the permanent defences at the main port harbours.

In late 1993, American and French tourists were shot dead at the hotel in a terrorist attack.

== Gallery ==
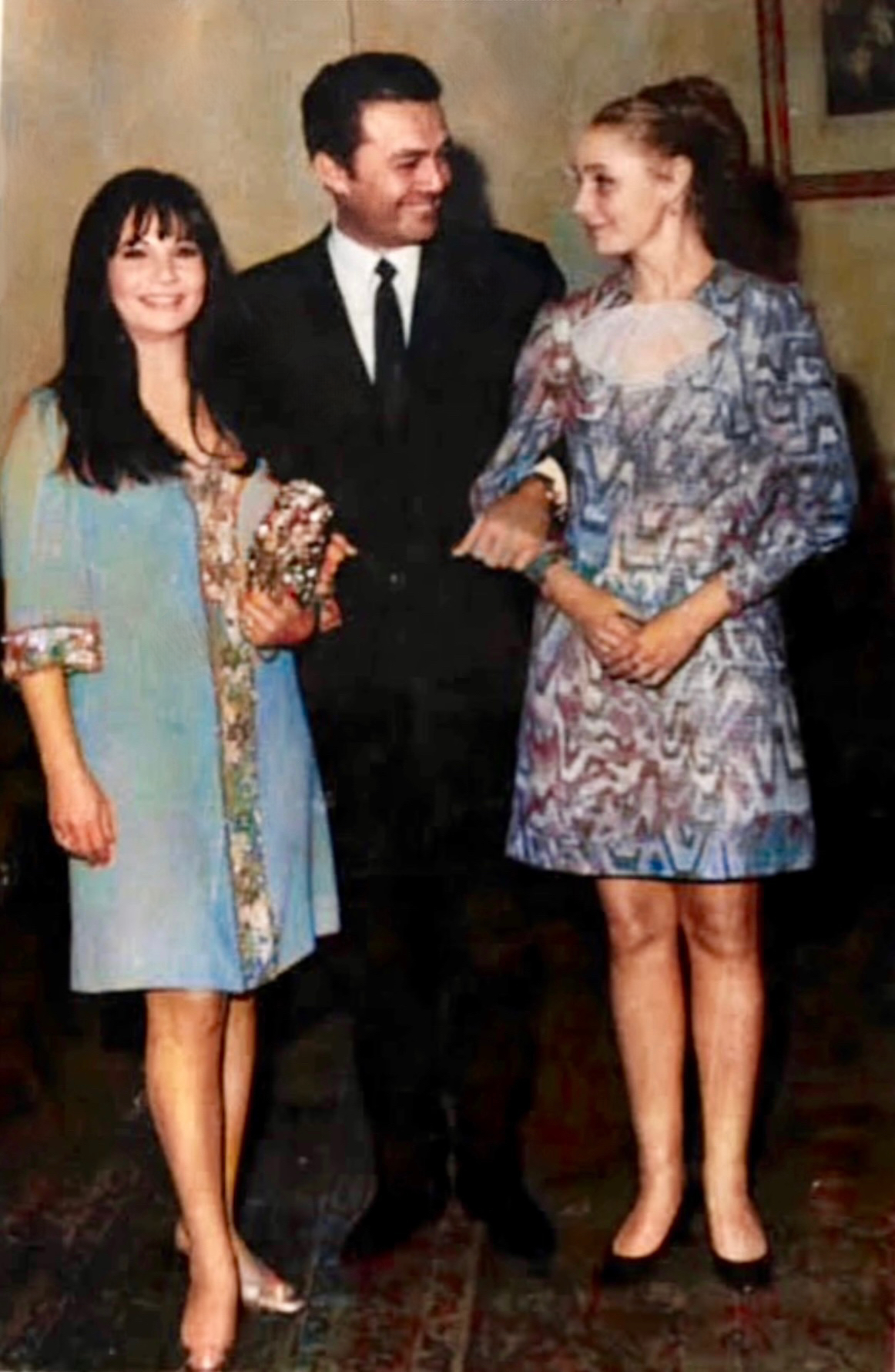
Salah Zulfikar, Shadia and a Russian actress at a cinematic event for A Taste of Fear in Semiramis InterContinental Hotel, Cairo in 1969

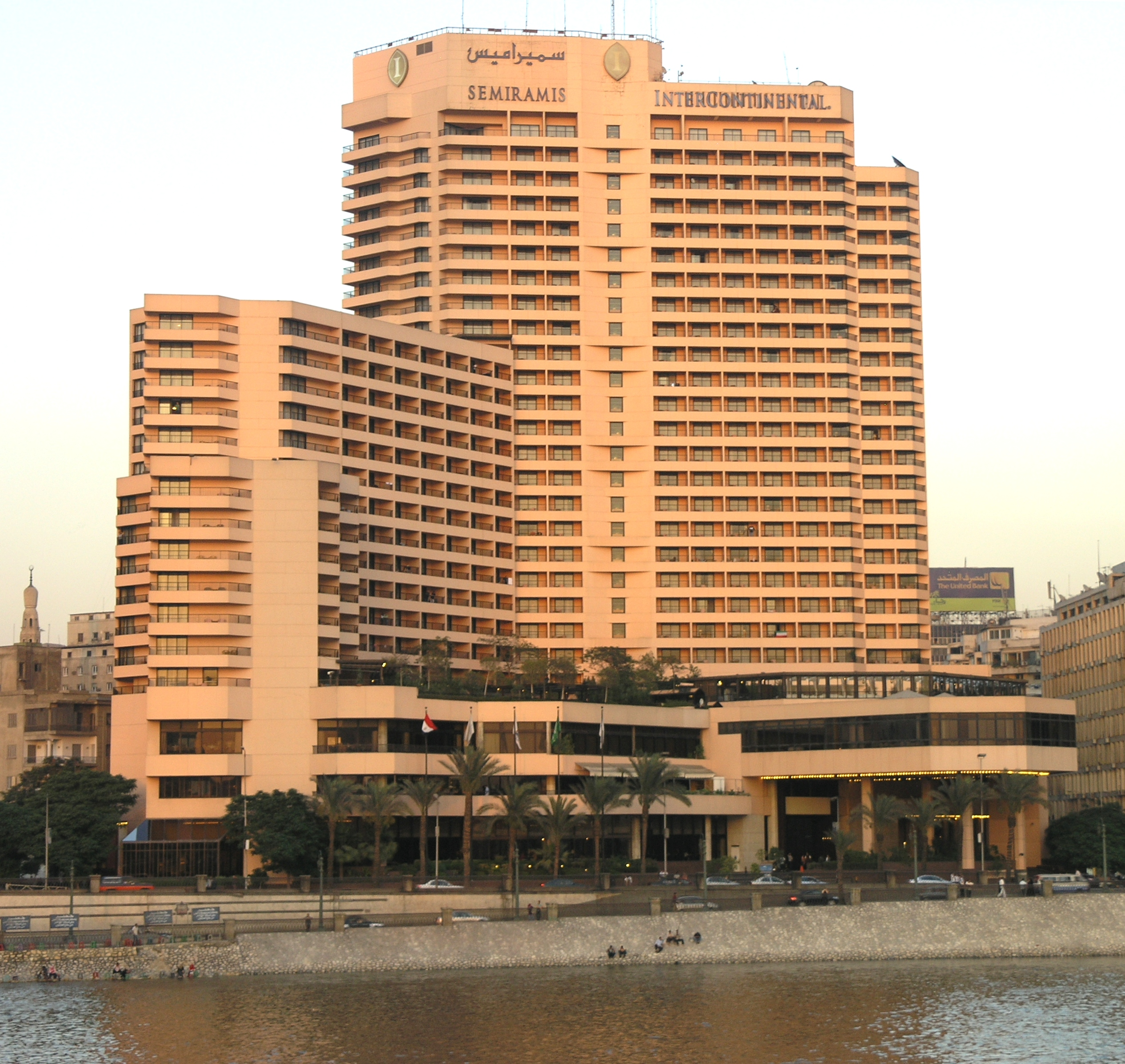
The hotel view from the Nile

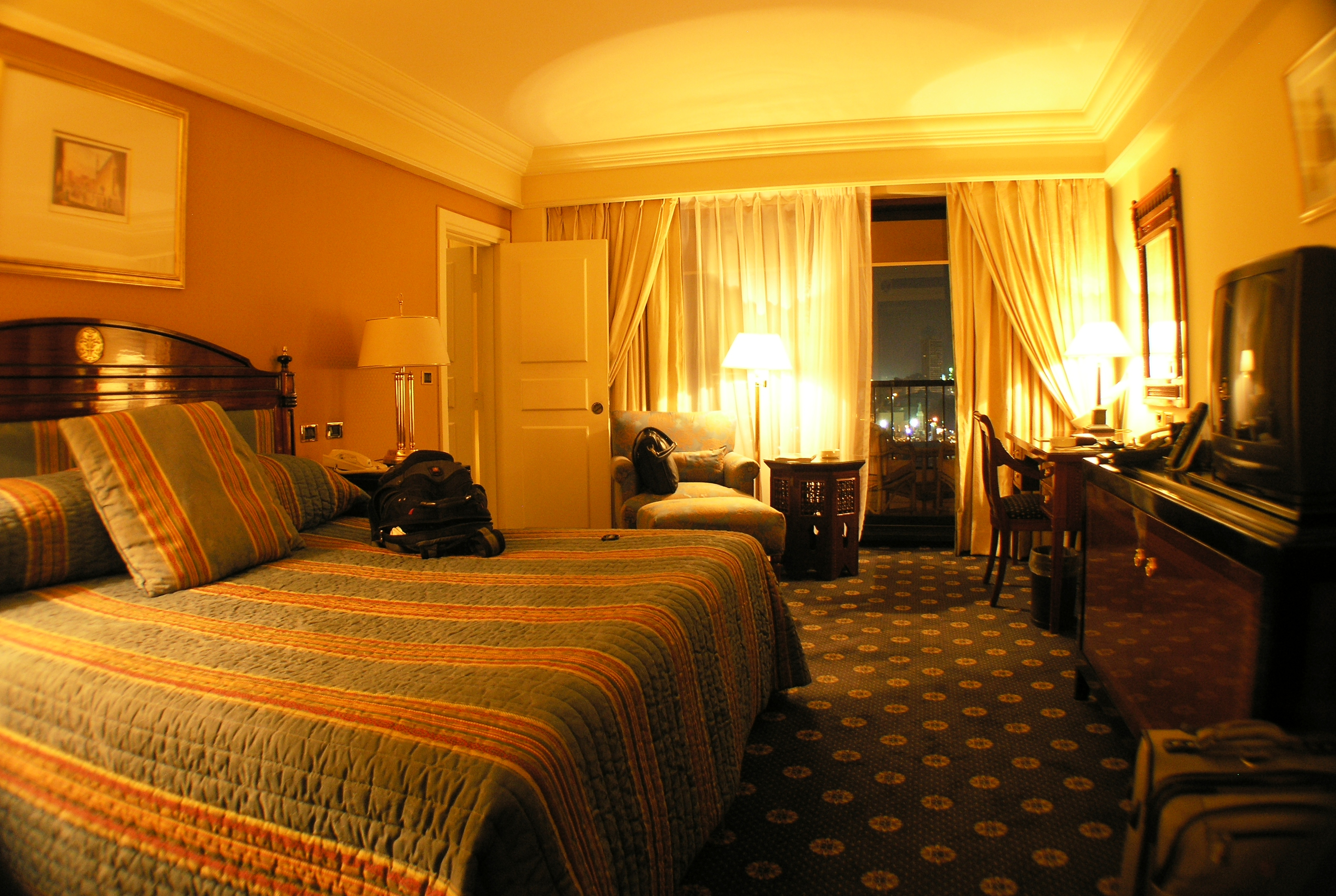
Hotel suite

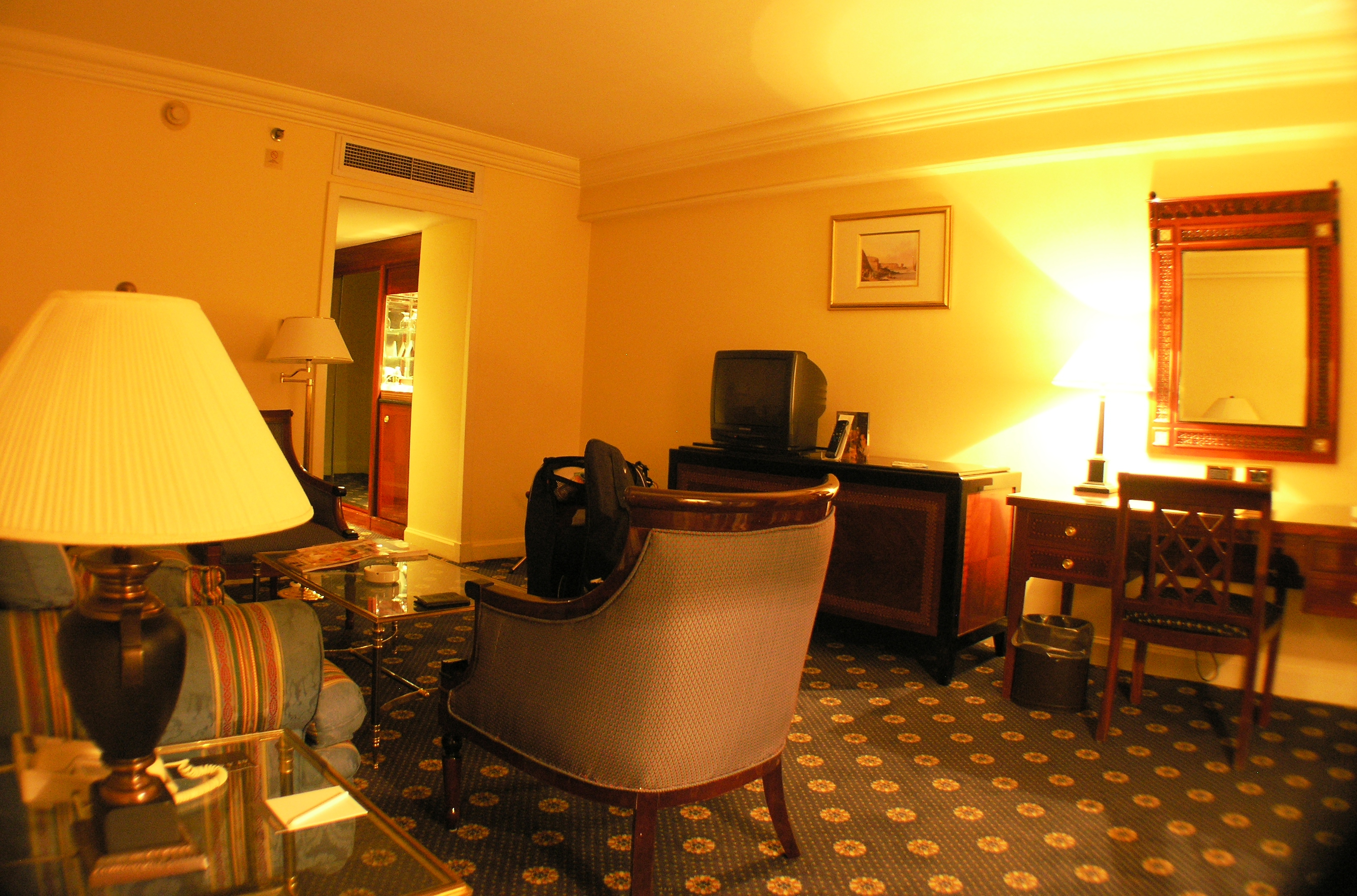
Hotel suite sitting room

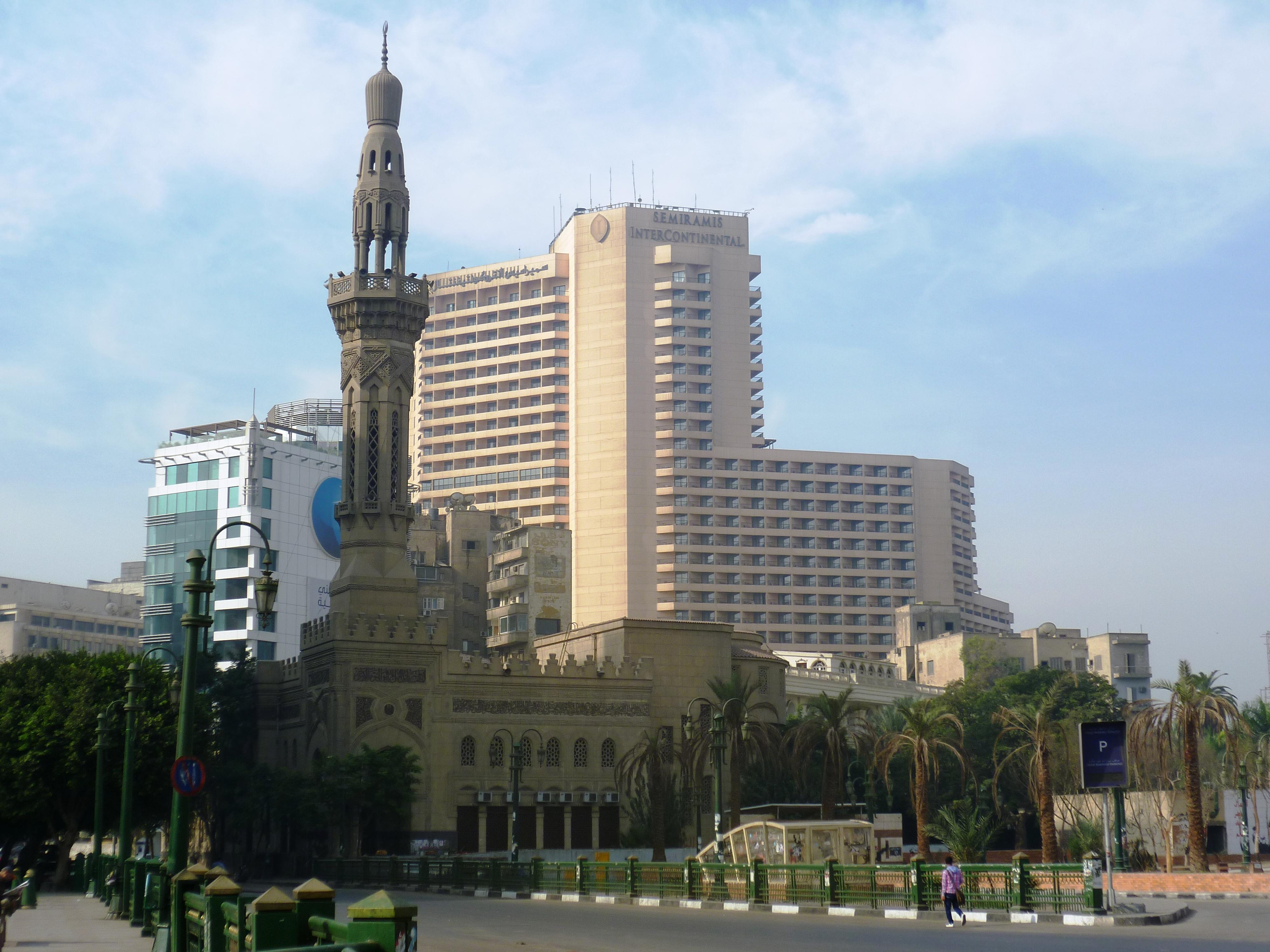
View of the hotel and the Omar Makram Mosque

== See also ==
- Skyscraper design and construction
- List of tallest buildings in Africa
