= Tourism in Egypt =

Tourism in Egypt is one of the leading sources of income, a vital component of the national economy. At its peak in 2010, the sector employed about 12% of workforce of Egypt, serving approximately 14.7 million visitors to Egypt, and providing revenues of nearly $12.5 billion as well as contributing more than 11% of GDP and 14.4% of foreign currency revenues.

== History ==
Income from tourism (1982–2003)

The number of tourists visiting Egypt was 0.1 million in 1952. Tourism became a significant sector of the economy from 1975 onwards, as Egypt eased visa restrictions for nearly all European and North American countries and established embassies in new nations such as Austria, Netherlands, Denmark, and Finland. In 1976, tourism was a central focus of the Government’s Five Year Plan, which allocated 12% of the budget to upgrading state-owned hotels, creating a loan fund for private hotels, and improving infrastructure, including road, rail, and air connectivity, for major tourist centers and coastal areas. Between 1979 and 1981, tourism experts and advisors from Turkey were brought in, and several new colleges were established with Turkish assistance to offer diploma courses in hospitality and tourism management. Tourist arrivals increased to 1.8 million in 1981 and rose further to 5.5 million in 2000. The number of visitors peaked in 2010, reaching 14.7 million. Revenues from tourism reached their highest level at $12.6 billion in the fiscal year 2018–2019.

In 2020, tourism-related revenues fell by nearly seventy percent to $4 billion. According to Tourism and Antiquities Minister Khaled El-Enany, tourist arrivals dropped to 3.5 million in 2020.

In February 2022, the managing director of the International Monetary Fund (IMF), Kristalina Georgieva, stated in a publication that Egypt’s tourism sector was the biggest loser from the coronavirus outbreak.

=== Impact of the Egyptian Revolution of 2011 ===
The 2011 Egyptian revolution that included attacks on foreign journalists such as British journalist Natasha Smith and South African Lara Logan in Cairo's Tahrir Midan (Liberation Square), along with the series of 2012–13 Egyptian protests, have negatively affected tourism. The new regime has worked hard to create stability and the Red Sea resorts, in particular, have had increasing tourist numbers.

During the Egyptian Revolution of 2011, the number of visitors plummeted by over 37 percent, falling from 14 million in 2010 to 9 million by the end of 2011. This has impacted a diverse range of businesses directly or indirectly dependent on tourism, from travel accommodation and tourist attractions to car rental and air transportation, as well as health and wellness industries. Tour operators offering heavy discounts to encourage tourists back have been somewhat successful at the Red Sea resorts where prices remain lower compared to 2011.

In the first half of 2014, the number of tourists further declined by 25 percent compared with the same period in 2013, while revenues also shrank by 25 percent.

In 2013, Egypt ranked 85th as the world's best country in terms of tourism and traveling, falling ten places from its ranking of 75 in 2011. However, it regained some ground in the 2017 rankings being rated 75th overall. As of the 2019 rankings, Egypt ranks 65th overall.

Israelis can cross into Egypt for 14 days without a visa at certain areas near Taba. They mostly come to enjoy areas on the Red Sea Riviera. In 2017, the first group of Israelis visited the more popular tourist attractions with the aid of strong security. It had been 18 months since any group of Israeli tourists had visited Egypt.

In 2017, Bloomberg said Egypt has "shed its years of social and political unrest" and made the top 20 list of 2017 travel destinations. The latest United Nations World Tourism Organization (UNWTO) has revealed that Egypt is one of the world's fast-growing tourist destination. In 2017, the number rose to 8 million tourists compared to the previous year which was about 5.26 million.

=== Security ===
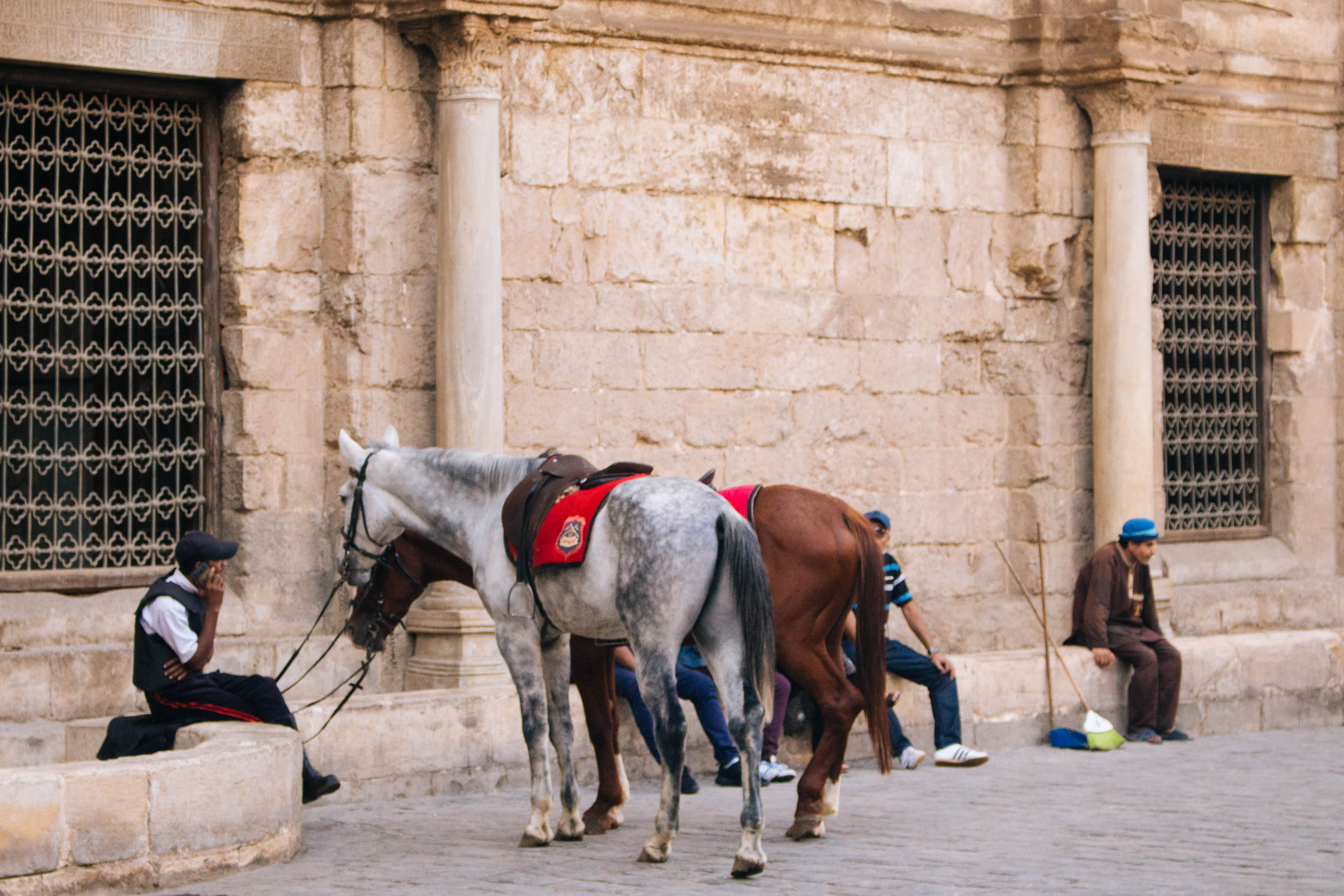
An Egyptian tourist police officer with his mounts in Muizz Street

The General Administration of Tourism and Antiquities Police is responsible for ensuring the security of tourists, archaeological sites, museums, and cultural facilities in Egypt, operating under the Egyptian Ministry of Interior. Its duties include securing the movement of tourist groups by monitoring or accompanying them, protecting archaeological and tourist sites, safeguarding Nile cruises, and combating crimes against tourists and antiquities. Additionally, the administration oversees tourism companies and shops, investigates tourist complaints, deploys police rescue vehicles to maintain security in key tourist areas, and addresses cases of trespassing.

Given Egypt’s geopolitical position in the Middle East and Africa, and its proximity to regional conflicts, the country has faced several terrorist incidents targeting tourism, with some of the most notable being the 1997 Luxor massacre, the 2004 Sinai bombings, the 2005 Cairo and Sharm el-Sheikh attacks, the 2006 Dahab bombings, and the downing of Metrojet Flight 9268. These attacks significantly impacted the tourism sector, leading to declines in visitor numbers and revenue.

Despite these challenges, Egyptian tourism demonstrated resilience and recovery, particularly in the 2010s. Even after the 2017 Hurghada attack, the sector quickly rebounded, achieving high annual revenues as tourist confidence was restored and security measures were strengthened.

== Statistics ==
Yearly tourist arrivals in millions

Tourism in Egypt in 1995–2020
Year	Total number of tourists, million	Total number of nights, million	Total revenue, billion USD
1995	2.9		3.0
2000	5.2		4.7
2005	8.2		7.2
2010	14.7	147.4	12.5
2011	9.8	114.2	8.7
2012	11.5	137.8	9.9
2013	9.5	94.4	6.0
2014	9.9	97.3	7.2
2015	9.3	84.1	3.3
2016	5.4	37.2	4.4
2017	8.9		9.8
2018	11.3		12.6
2019	13.0	136	
2020	3.5		4.0
2021			4.9
2022	11.7		10.7
2023	14.9		13.6
2024	15.7		14.4

Most tourists to Egypt came from the following countries

Country	2022	2021	2020	2019	2018	2017	2016	2015	2014
Germany	1,302,240	423,272	352,845	1,729,051	1,707,382	1,232,343	653,915	1,020,879	877,228
Russia	1,010,921	1,115,468	80,643	264,108	145,642	93,992	53,864	2,389,882	3,138,958
Saudi Arabia	799,560	501,813	150,886	891,626	909,092	669,574	507,325	433,067	350,109
Israel	640,180	168,175	37,855	530,226	405,399	234,986	234,676	161,035	140,425
Italy	528,269	85,063	95,804	619,425	421,992	225,148	131,458	332,932	400,356
United Kingdom	506,460	109,398	114,651	455,614	435,772	319,388	231,299	869,481	905,713
United States	428,448	233,376	118,079	349,596	287,796	226,429	184,341	188,712	154,619
Poland	420,832	286,723	111,289	413,892	303,720	177,433	67,231	207,253	302,815
France	310,126	150,989	89,218	298,812	217,533	150,241	101,075	136,623	144,766
Ukraine	242,766	1,402,460	741,947	1,551,680	1,174,234	797,270	425,000	363,586	446,450
Libya	298,319	250,125	135,584	440,309	410,659	336,370	282,845	268,541	210,957
Palestine	222,171	134,699	47,993	163,630	136,010	73,855	68,344	62,240	114,057
Kuwait	190,430	69,281	39,939	164,873	164,532	176,629	150,352	139,666	120,882
Netherlands	184,846	55,645	65,024	218,527	189,679	151,791	82,823	150,422	126,817
Jordan	178,962	120,226	42,450	203,603	208,283	211,842	179,827	177,131	170,783
Kazakhstan	150,726	180,810	58,145	156,591	133,015	69,570	6,571	22,998	15,106
Austria	140,521	50,466	32,823	173,720	164,696	122,916	67,541	144,772	130,522
Switzerland	136,112	85,352	33,758	119,541	110,405	75,403	46,089	90,483	80,389
Belgium	121,681	34,015	31,488	148,974	136,891	95,725	50,591	92,010	74,246
Syria	103,073	78,668	31,000	64,268	65,803	63,687	53,662	52,281	63,081
Lithuania	58,814	43,536	31,138	90,946	69,907	42,632	17,216	31,780	30,856
China	58,116	31,301	44,173	214,202	234,747	287,260	179,459	115,158	61,697
Belarus	56,920	247,219	135,156	327,332	273,987	162,481	53,972	149,641	166,550
Iraq	52,450	52,083	43,110	94,702	104,805	90,922	76,578	47,533	49,986
Total Foreigner	11,724,065	7,997,917	3,676,359	13,026,441	11,346,389	8,292,326	5,398,934	9,327,804	9,877,762

== Major attractions ==
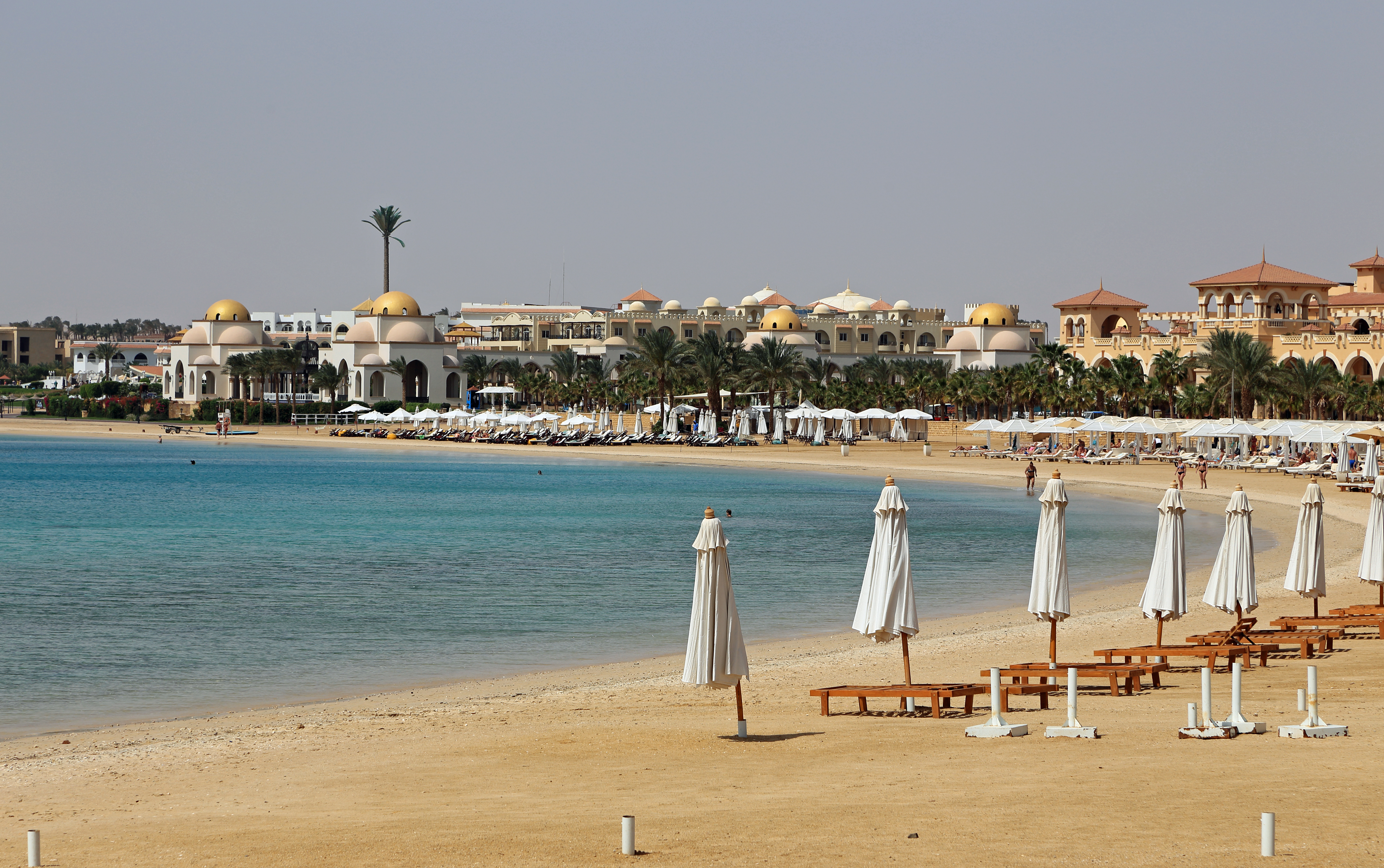
A beach in the Red Sea resort town of Sahl Hasheesh

The Nile in Aswan

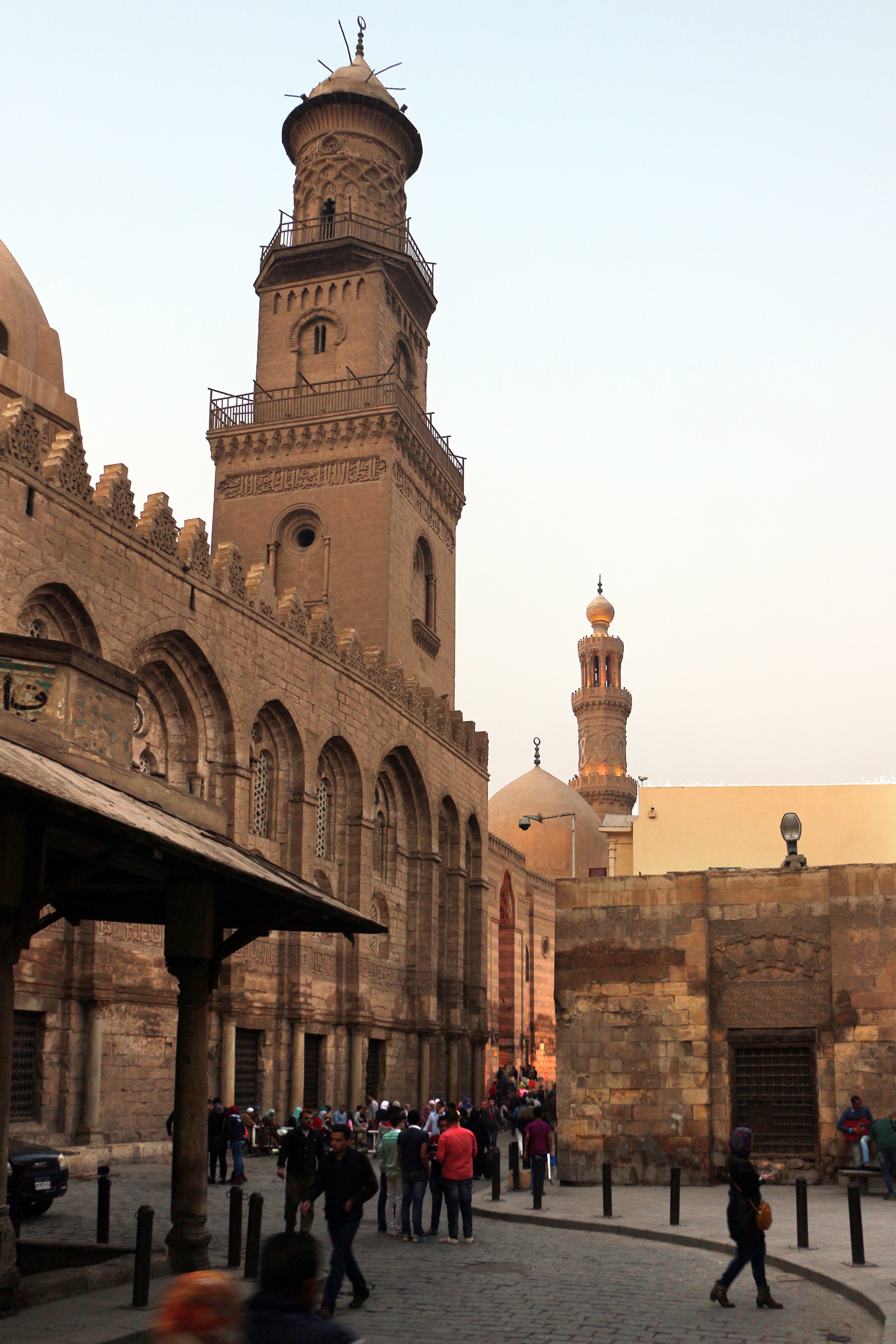
Old Cairo, Cairo

Major tourist destinations include the millennia-old monuments in the Nile Valley. Principal among them are the Pyramids and Great Sphinx at Giza, the Abu Simbel temples south of Aswan and the Karnak Temple Complex and Valley of the Kings near Luxor. Attractions in Cairo include the Cairo Museum and the Mosque of Muhammad Ali Pasha. Near the Giza pyramids, the Grand Egyptian Museum was officially inaugurated on 1 November 2025; described as the world's largest archaeological museum, it houses about 100,000 artefacts and displays the complete Tutankhamun tomb collection together for the first time.The coast of the Sinai Peninsula has well-visited seaside resorts, in addition to Hurghada City on the Red Sea coast and the Famous El Gouna Resort 25 km Hurghada.

- Giza, 20 km southwest of Cairo, has several remains from the 26th century BC such as temples and monuments to pharaohs including the Great Sphinx, and the Great Pyramids of Giza.
- Saqqara, 30 km south of Cairo is a vast, ancient burial ground which served as the necropolis for the Ancient Egyptian capital of Memphis. It features numerous pyramids, including the world's oldest standing step pyramid, as well as a number of mastabas.
- Luxor, about 500 km south of Cairo, is the site of the ancient city of Thebes. It includes the ruins of the temple complexes at Karnak and Luxor, which stand within the modern city. On the opposite side of the Nile River lie the monuments, temples and tombs on the West Bank Necropolis, which include the Valley of the Kings and Valley of the Queens.
- Abu Simbel, about 850 km south of Cairo (near the Egypt–Sudan border) is an archaeological site comprising two massive rock temples originally carved out of a mountainside during the reign of Pharaoh Ramesses II (13th century BC). The complex was relocated in its entirety in the 1960s to avoid being submerged during the creation of Lake Nasser. They are now situated on an artificial hill made from a domed structure high above the Aswan High Dam reservoir.
- Alexandria is a main summer resort, due to its beaches, ancient history and Museums, especially the Bibliotheca Alexandrina, a modern project based on reviving the ancient Library of Alexandria.
- Sinai Peninsula- Sinai has the beach resorts of Sharm el-Sheikh, Dahab, Nuweiba and Taba as well as locations mentioned in the Bible such as Mount Sinai ("Jabal Musa"). Saint Catherine's Monastery may be the oldest working Christian monastery in the world.
- Ain Sukhna, about 110 km east of Cairo has a number of beach resorts.
- Assiut, in south of Egypt, has historic buildings from the time of the pharaohs and ancient mosques.
- Hurghada and El Gouna resort on the Red Sea Coast, 25 km from Hurghada International Airport, are both famous for their beaches, snorkeling and diving, and El Gouna is famous for its nightlife.

== Ancient Egypt ==
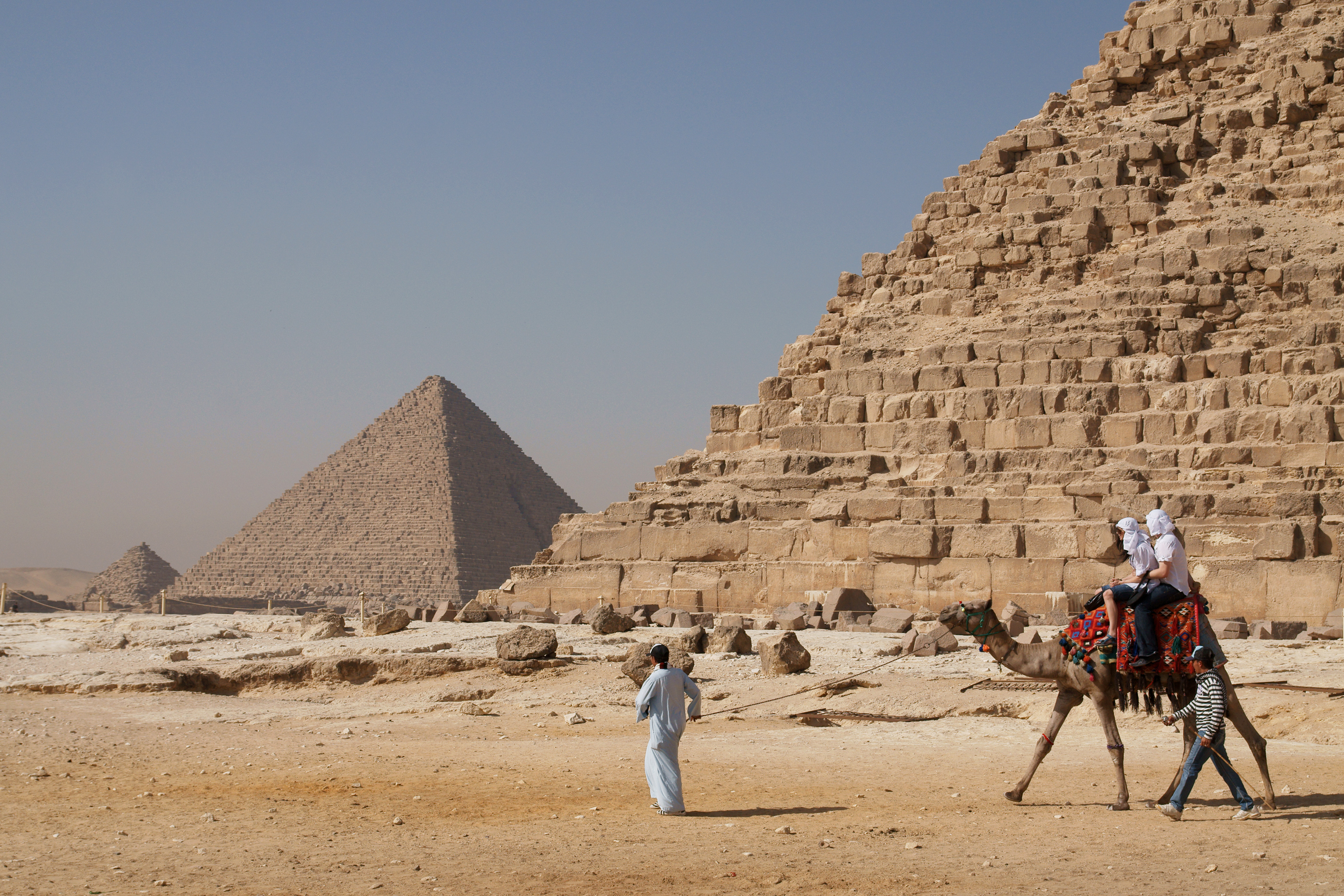
Tourists riding an Arabian camel in front of Pyramid of Khafre. The Giza Necropolis is one of Egypt's main tourist attractions.

The civilization of Ancient Egypt left behind numerous monuments and temples, many of which are major attractions for modern visitors. Among them are the pyramids, with over 70 pyramids along the Nile, the most famous being the three pyramids of Giza. Built over 4,000 years ago during the reigns of Kings Cheops, Kefren, and Mykerinos, these pyramids served as royal tombs, with their bodies buried within. The pyramid of Cheops, also known as the Great Pyramid, is the largest, originally standing at 145 meters. Beside the pyramids stands the Sphinx, a colossal lion-bodied statue guarding the site.

Further south lies the Saqqara Complex, a vast necropolis that includes Memphis, the administrative capital of ancient Egypt, founded around 3000 BC by Menes. This area contains 11 pyramids, as well as Zoser's funerary complex, the tomb of Mereruka, and the Serapeum, an underground vault where mummified Apis bulls were interred in massive granite sarcophagi.

In Thebes, the Valley of the Kings holds the rock-cut tombs of 26 pharaohs from the 18th to 20th dynasties, including Tutankhamun, Ramses the Great, and Tuthmosis III. These tombs were carved into the cliffs to protect them from looting, unlike the exposed pyramid tombs of earlier periods. Nearby, the Valley of the Queens contains additional royal burials, preserving the legacy of Egypt’s most powerful rulers.

== Nile cruises ==
Old Nile Cruise

Cruises on the Nile are offered since the late 19th century, originally as 20-21 day journeys from Cairo to Aswan with a 3-4 day stop in Luxor. Due to the security situation, these itineraries are no longer available, and most modern cruises start at Luxor and run to Aswan. Few short cruises on the Lake Nasser visit the monuments in Nubian region (Abu Simbel). Longer cruises include a visit the northern town of Dendera. Few Nile cruises started again to sail the long route from Cairo to Aswan. The number of cruise ships on the Nile exceeds 300. October to February is the preferred cruising season with temperatures more tolerable.

=== Cruising history ===
The interest in Egypt as a destination for Western tourists started in the early 19th century once Napoleon started bringing Egyptian artefacts to Europe. The 19th century travel typically involved a passenger sailboat (dahabeah). These motorless vessels had to be towed by rowboats with an inopportune wind, and thus required long itineraries: it was not uncommon to start the trip in Cairo in October, travel to Aswan, and return in January. There were hundreds of dahabeas to choose from in Cairo, with six to ten cabins each. The larger ones were up to 30 meters long and carried dozens of people, mostly the crew.

The change came with introduction of steamers by Thomas Cook, who in 1869 hired two steamboats, Benba and Beniswaif. The ships were following (lagging by two days) the steamers of the British royal flotilla that was carrying then-Prince of Wales Edward (since 1901, king Edward VII). The time for travel had shrunk to three weeks, and the trip was made much safer, opening the route to unaccompanied women.

Upon return in 1870, Cook became the appointed agent for all passenger traffic on the Nile. At first the company operated a fleet of steamboats hired from the khedive, but under John Mason Cook, who took over the control in 1885, built its own ships, "floating palaces ... finer than anything ... since the days of Cleopatra", opening an era of mass Western tourism. These "less cultured" tourists were sometimes derisively referred to as cookies of cookites.

Modern cruises use larger vessels that function as floating hotels. Other Nile trips can be on a felucca, a traditional sailboat, on which overnight journeys may require passengers to sleep in the open air on deck and the sailors to double as cooks.

Between October and mid April the daytime temperatures are cooler and the Nile’s locks are open. From around the middle of April locks on the river are closed in order to manage water levels, requiring passengers to disembark on one side of the lock and transfer to another boat on the other side.

== Transportation ==
Passports and visas are required for foreign visitors except nationals of several Middle Eastern countries. Travelers from most African countries must present proof of cholera and yellow fever vaccination.

=== Airports ===
There are 15 international airports in Egypt that serve all of the country's major cities including Cairo International Airport, Sphinx International Airport, Sharm El Sheikh International Airport, Borg El Arab International Airport and Hurghada International Airport.

Cairo International Airport is the main gateway to Egypt and is located about 15 miles northeast of the city in northern Egypt. Cairo's three terminals receive flights from all major world cities including those in North America, Europe, Asia and Africa. Central Cairo is accessible from the airport by bus, taxi, or limousine.

Luxor International Airport, Sohag International Airport and Aswan International Airport serve Upper Egypt and act as a gateway to the tourist destinations of the region. The airport in Luxor has connections from the UK, Germany, Russia, France, Italy, and Turkey. Two terminals serve international and domestic flights, with a number of Egyptian carriers including Air Cairo and Egypt Air operating from the airport.

=== Railways ===
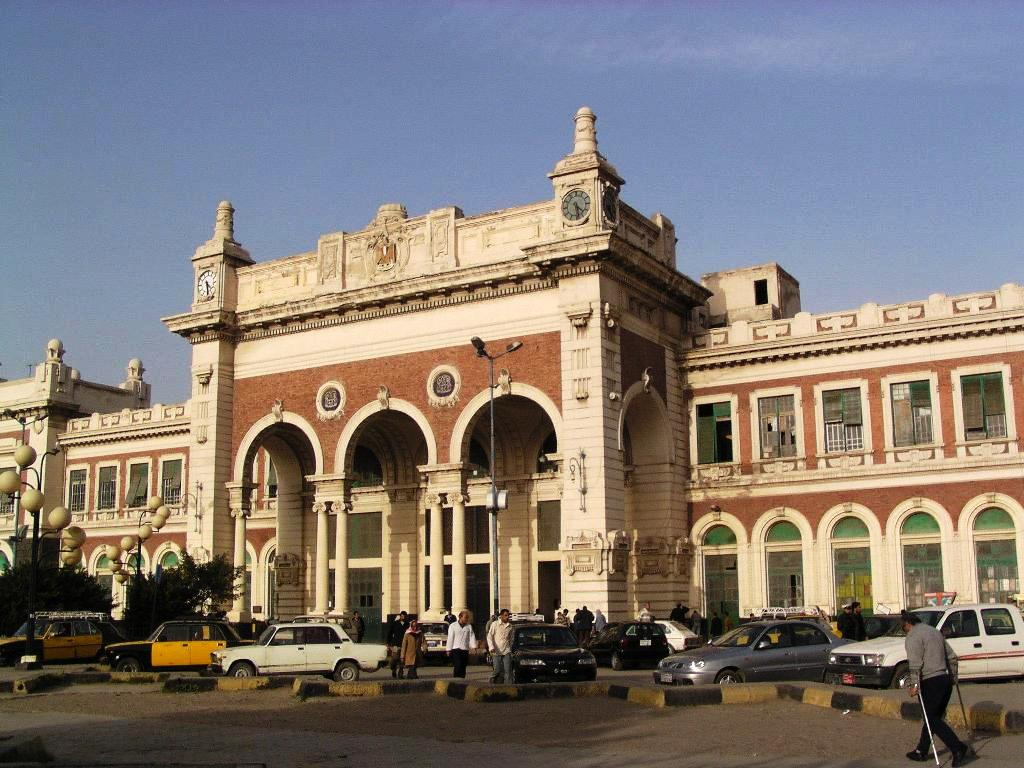
Misr Train Station in Alexandria

Egyptian Railways is the backbone of passenger transportation in Egypt, with 800 million passenger miles annually.

Air-conditioned passenger trains usually have 1st and 2nd class service, while trains without air condition will have 2nd and 3rd class. Most of the network connects the densely populated area of the Nile Delta with Cairo and Alexandria as hubs.

The Alexandria-Cairo-Luxor-Aswan link is served daily in both directions by air-conditioned sleeper trains of Abela Egypt. This service is especially attractive to tourists who can spend the night on the train as it covers the stretch between Cairo and Luxor. A luxury express train also connects Cairo with Marsa Matruh towards the Egypt–Libya border.

== Gallery ==
Major Egyptian sites

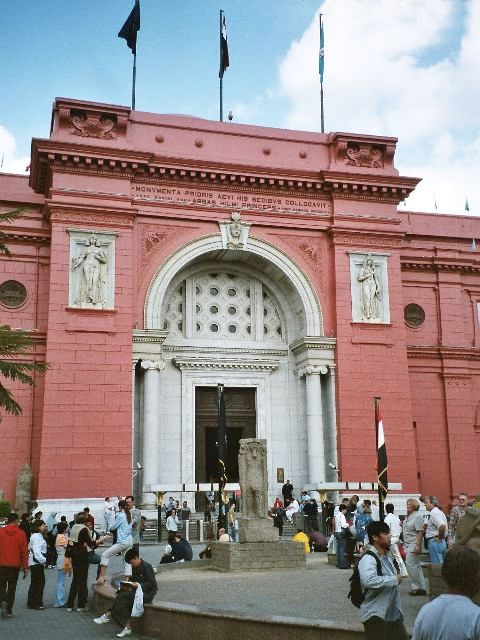
The Egyptian Museum

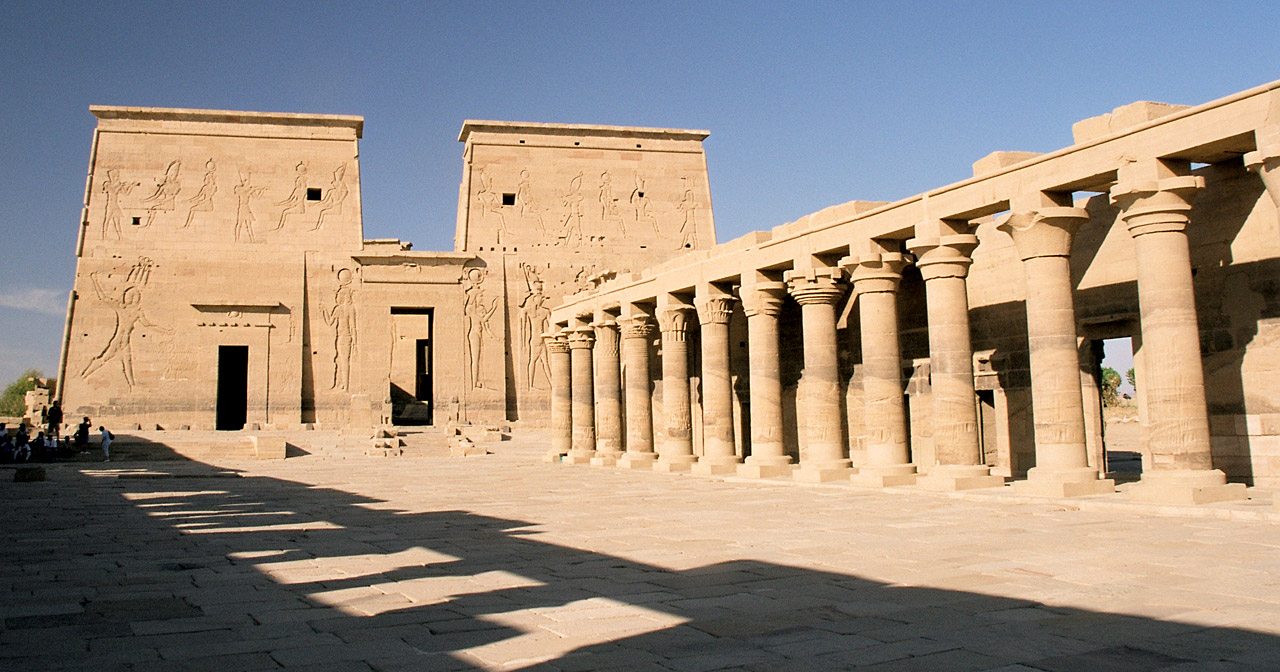
Philae

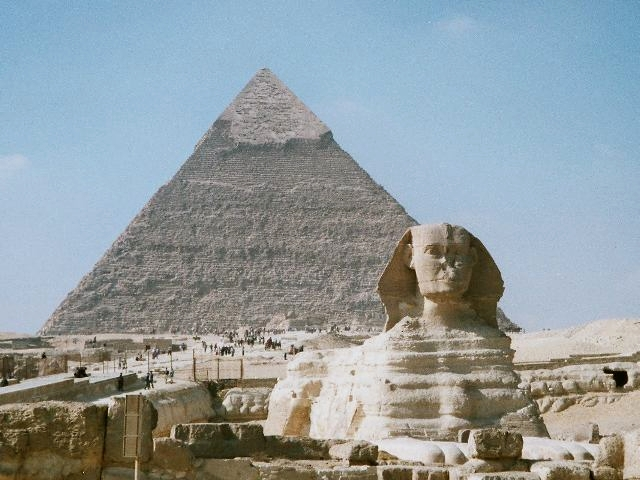
The Sphinx

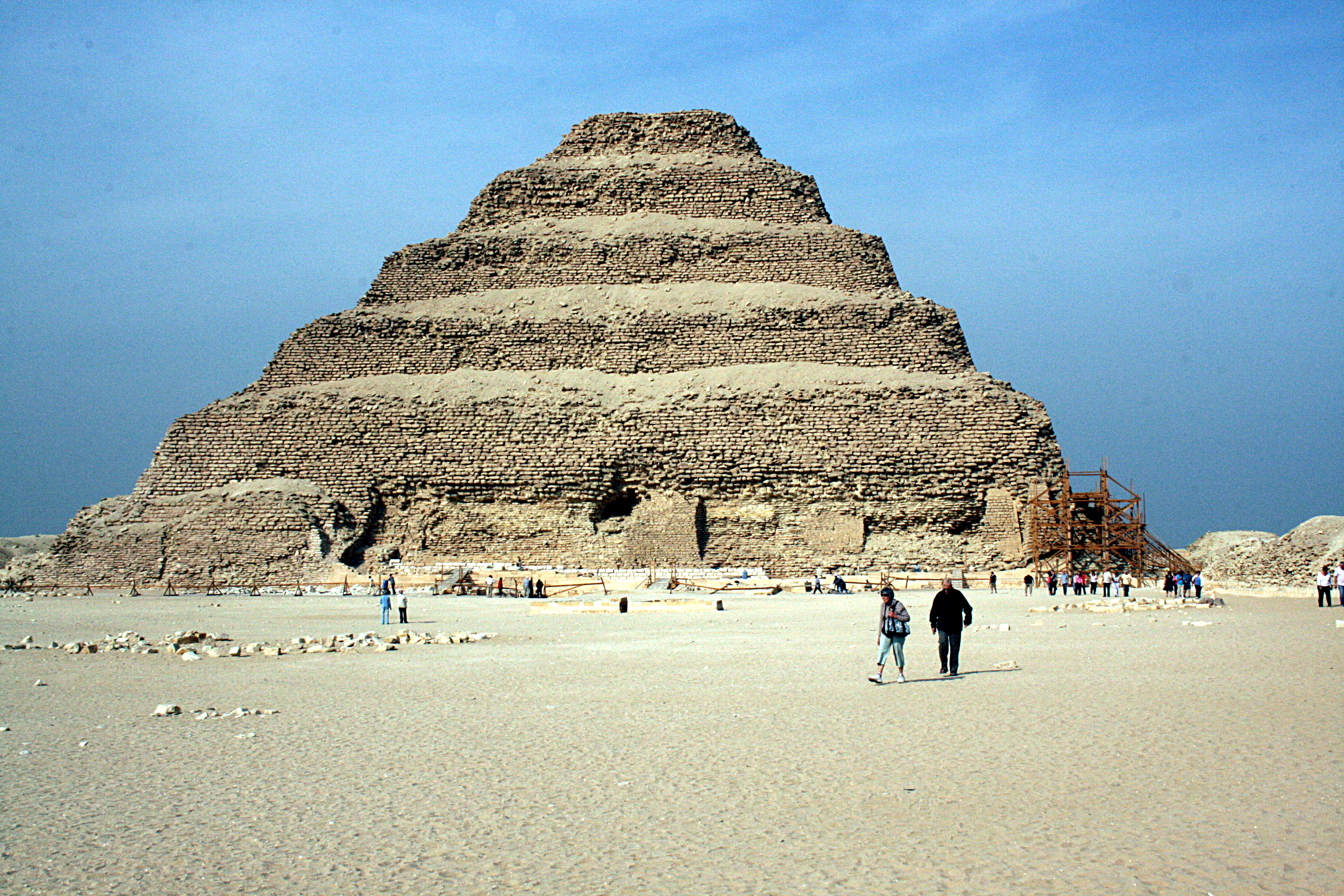
Djoser Step Pyramid

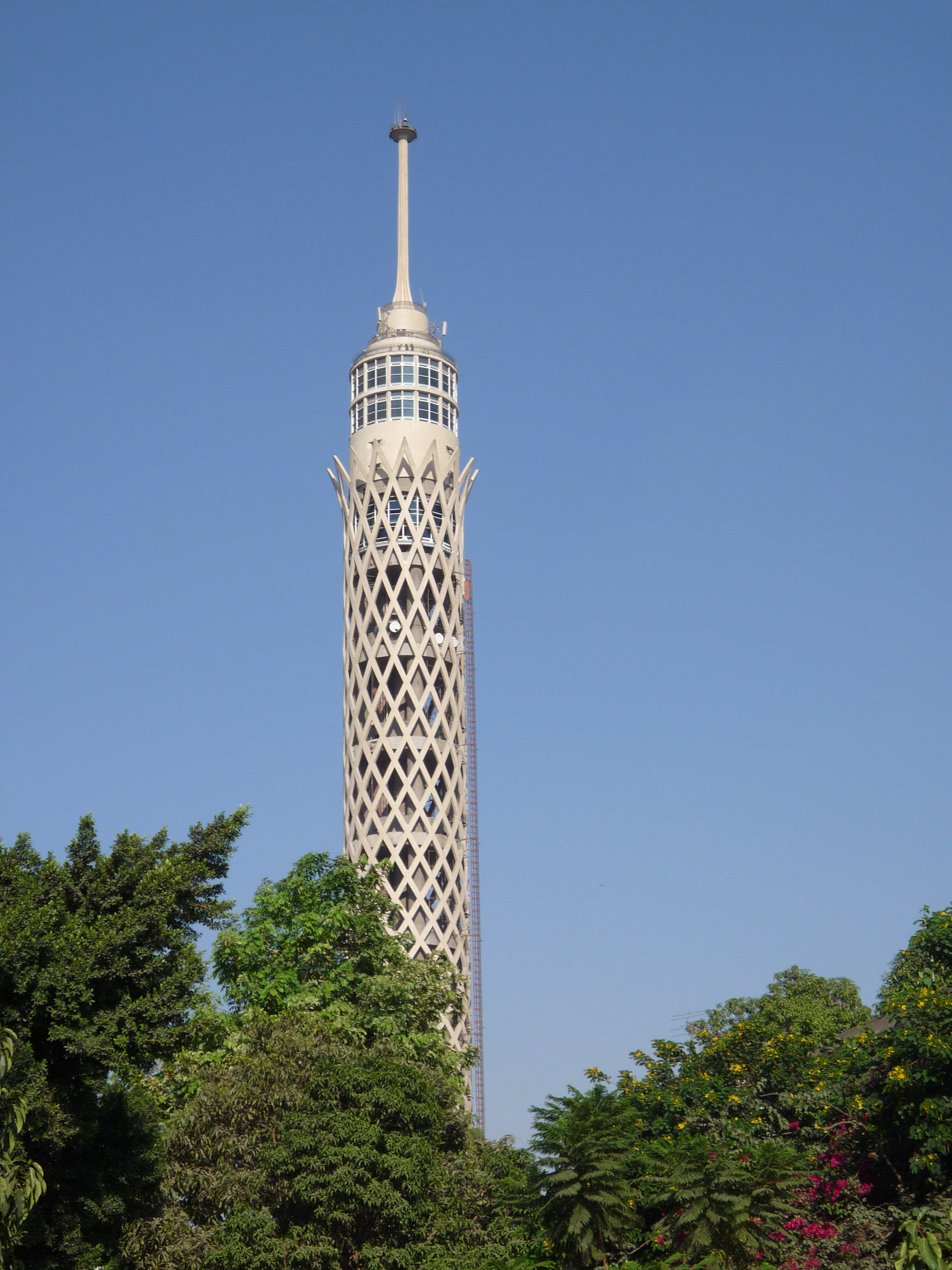
Cairo Tower

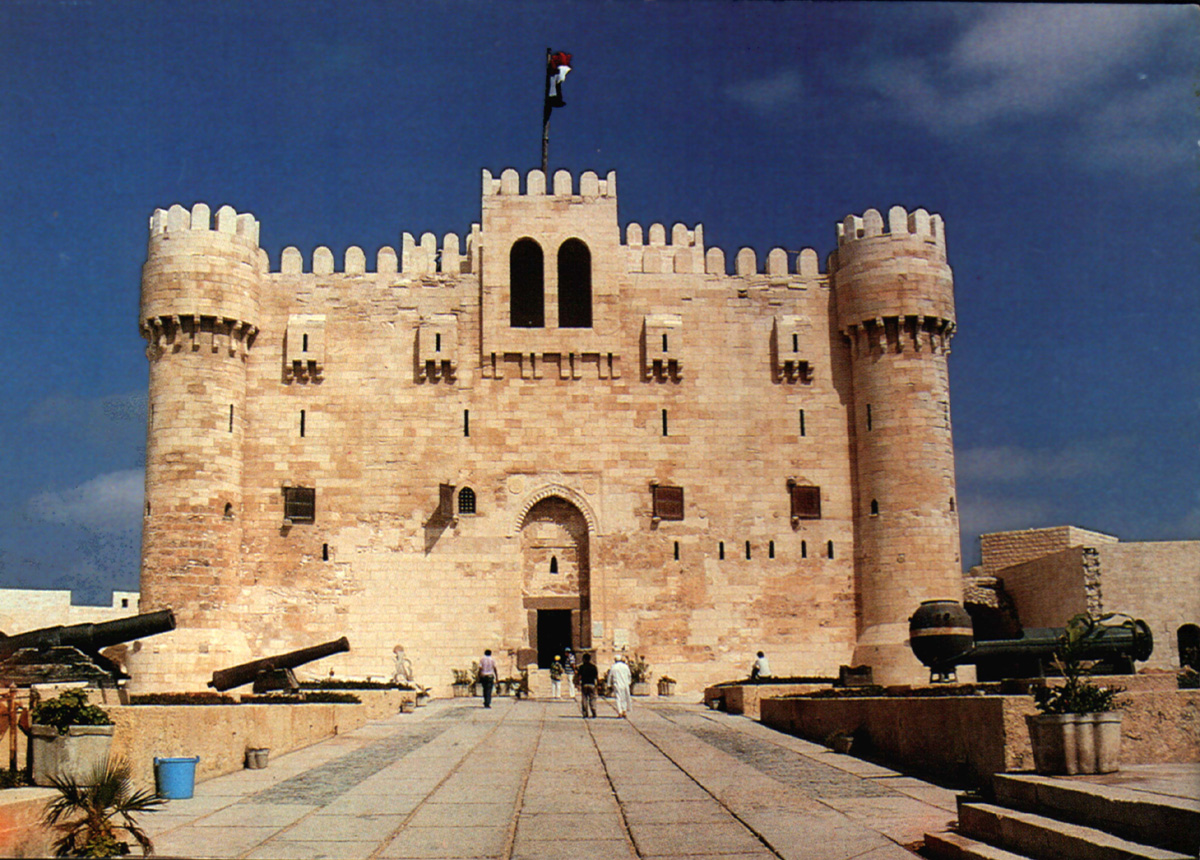
Qaitbay Citadel in Alexandria

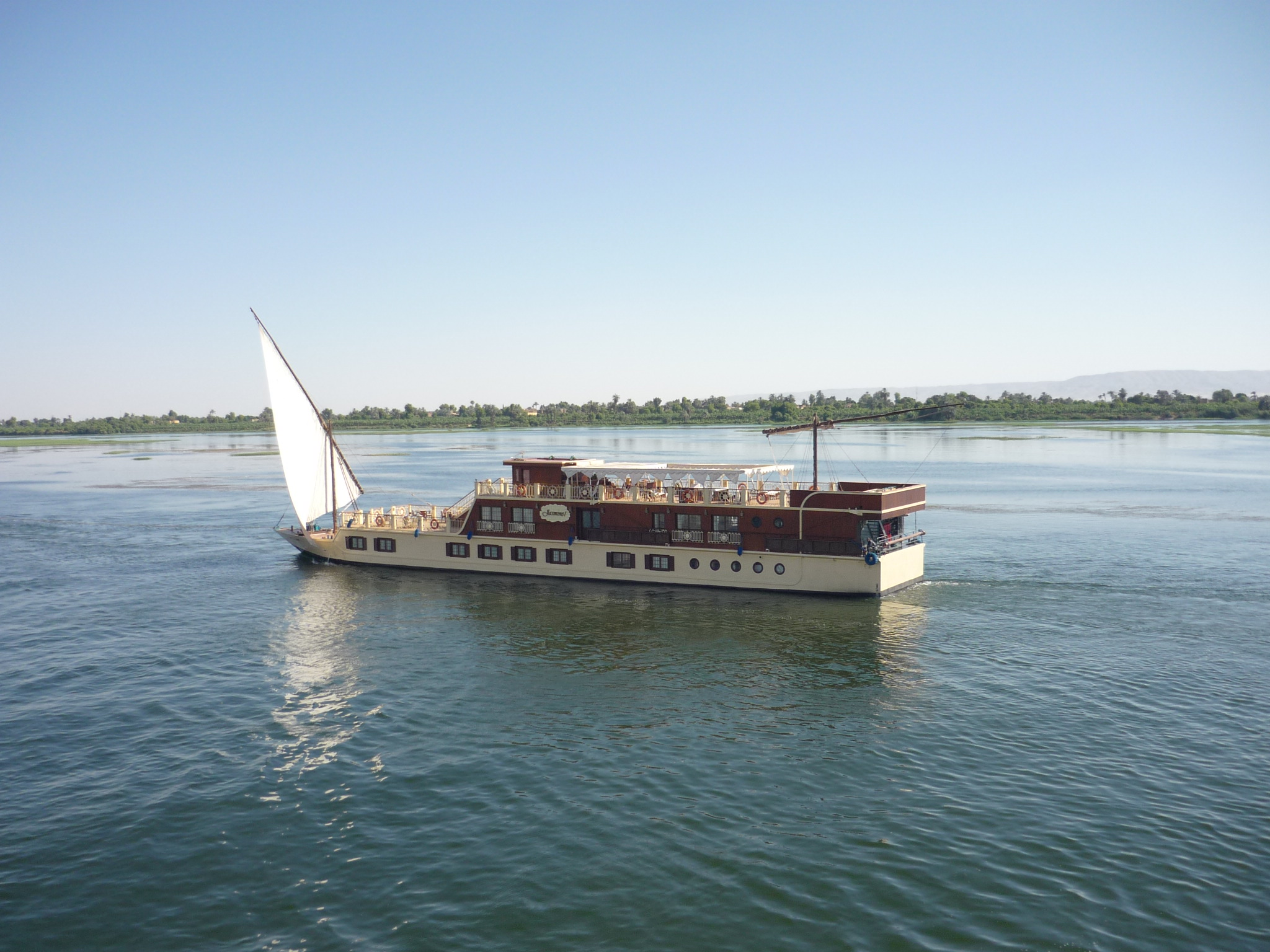
Nile Cruise Between Aswan and Esna

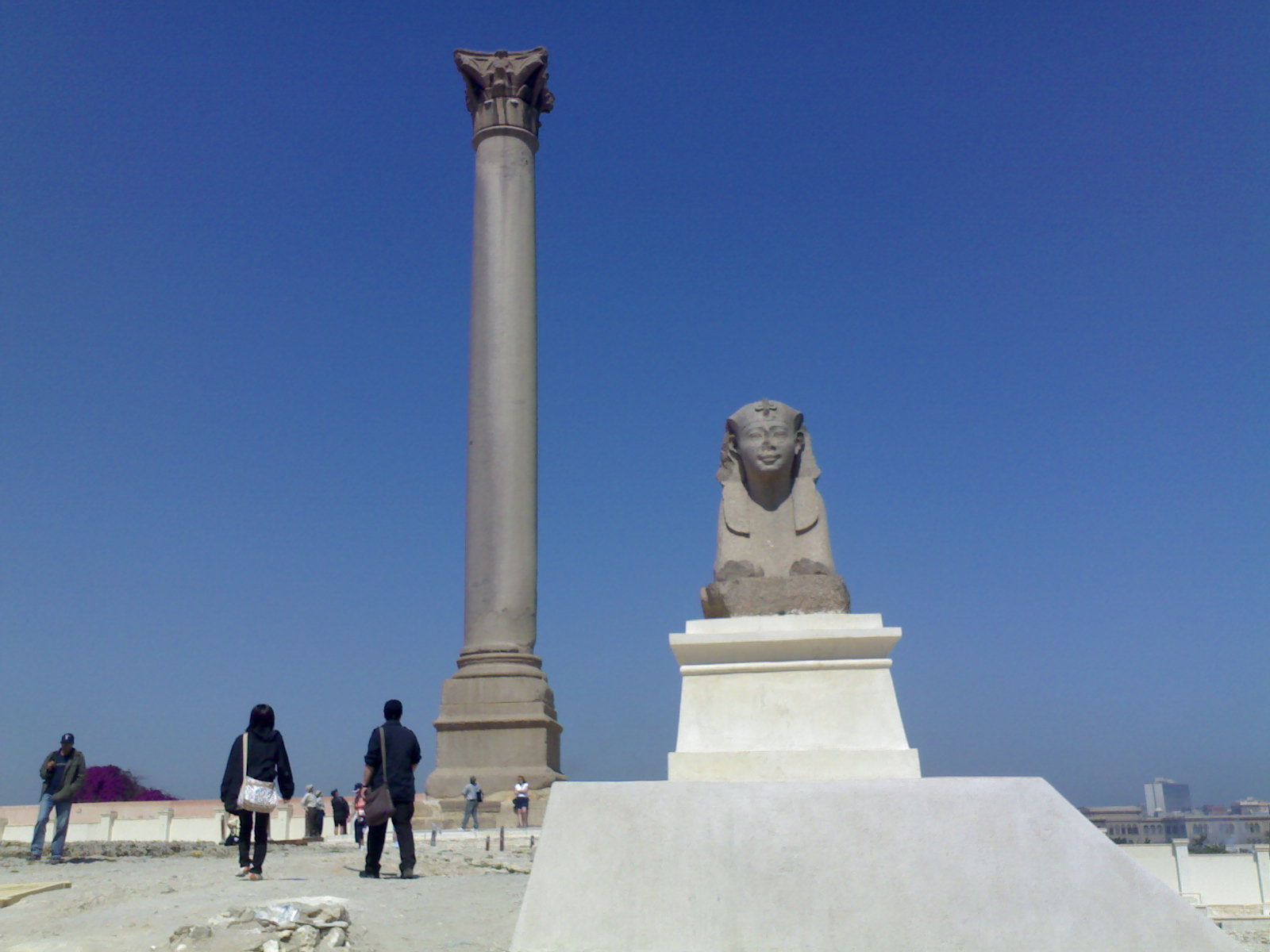
Pompey's Pillar in Alexandria

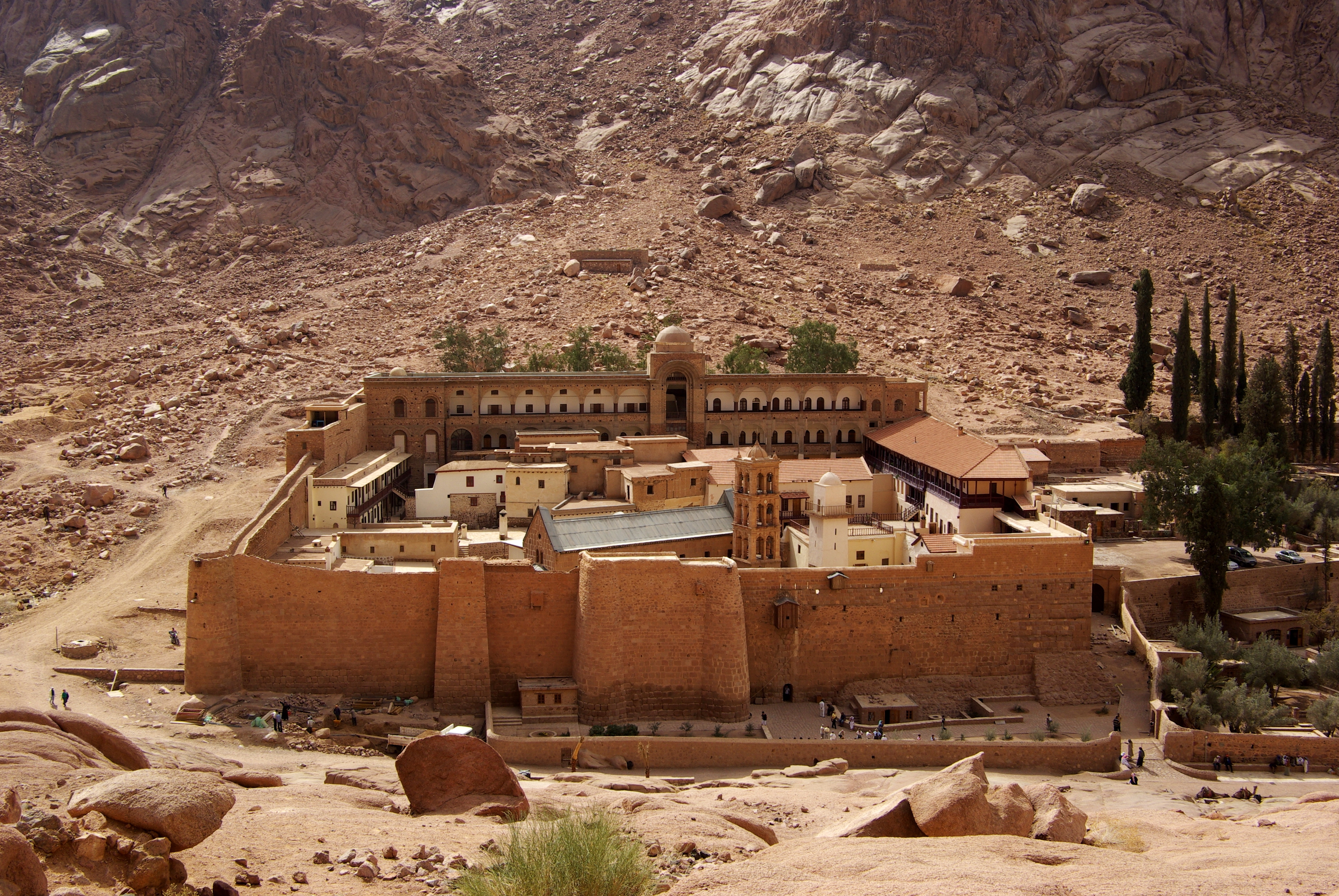
Saint Catherine's Monastery on Mount Sinai

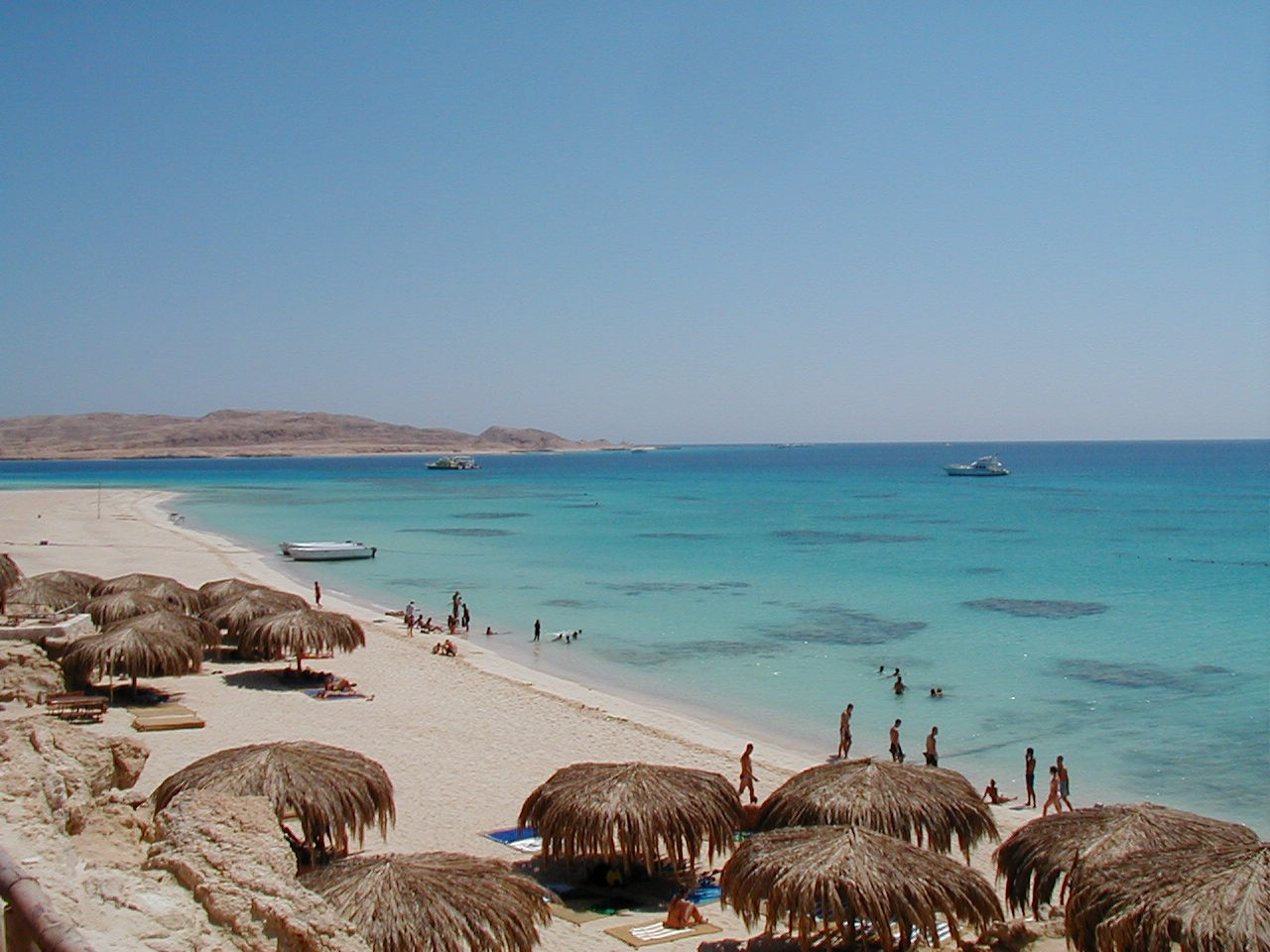
Al-Mahmeya, a National Protected Park in Hurghada

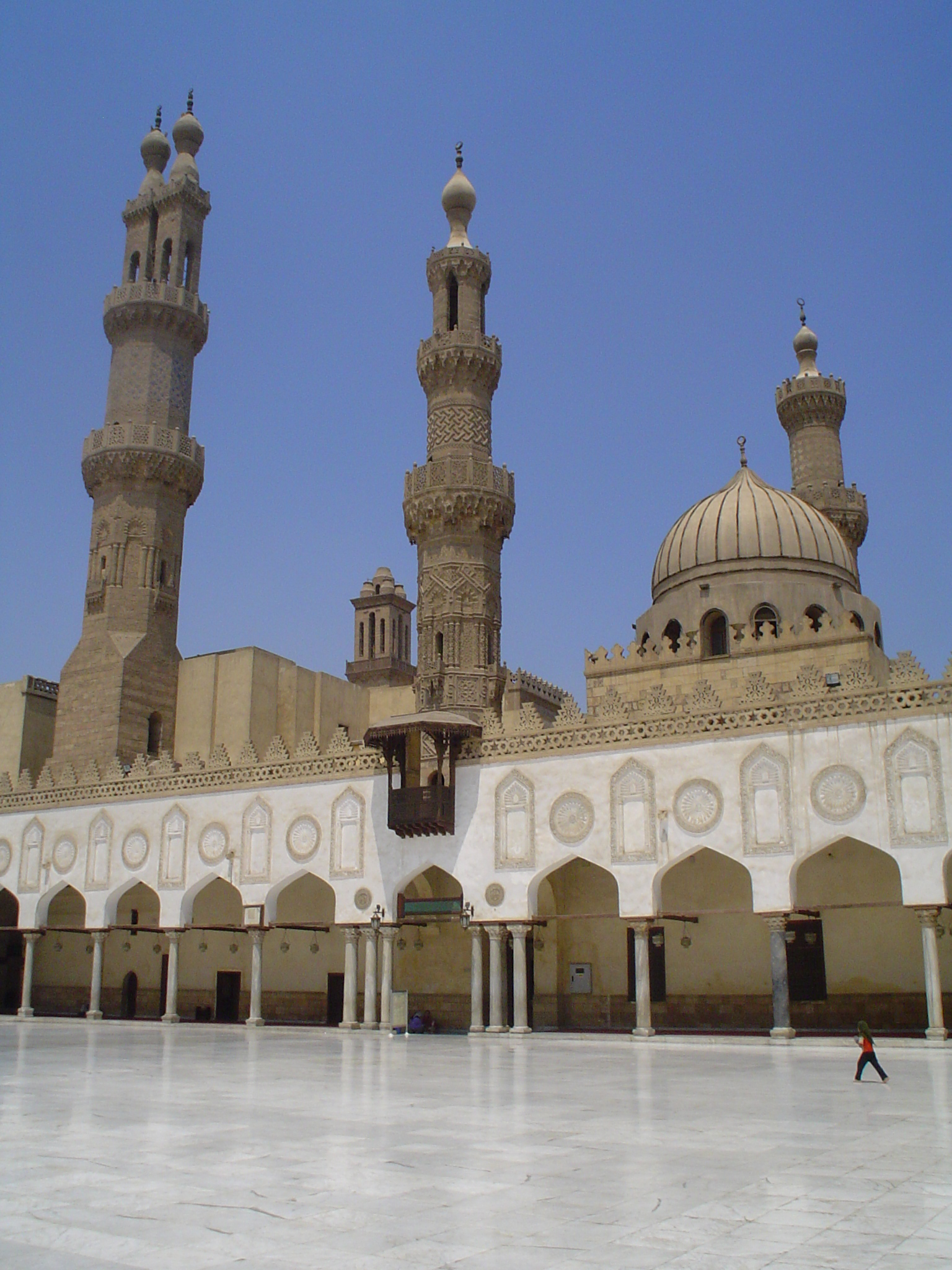
Al-Azhar Mosque, built in the Fatimid era in Cairo

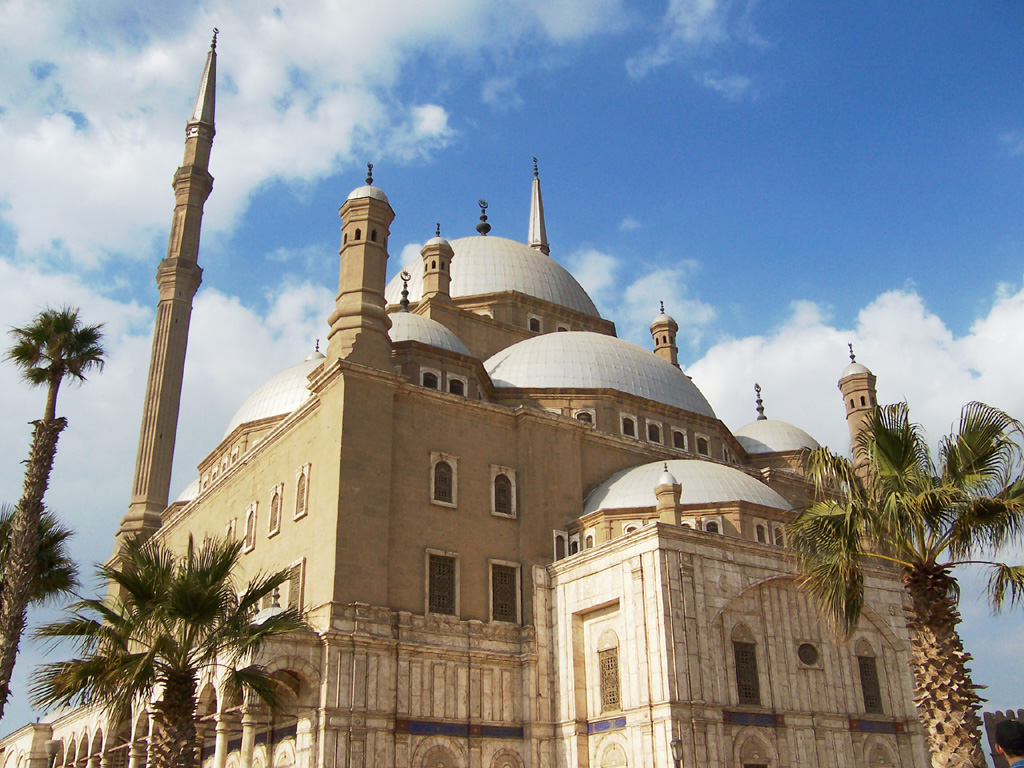
The Mosque of Mohamed Ali Pasha in Cairo

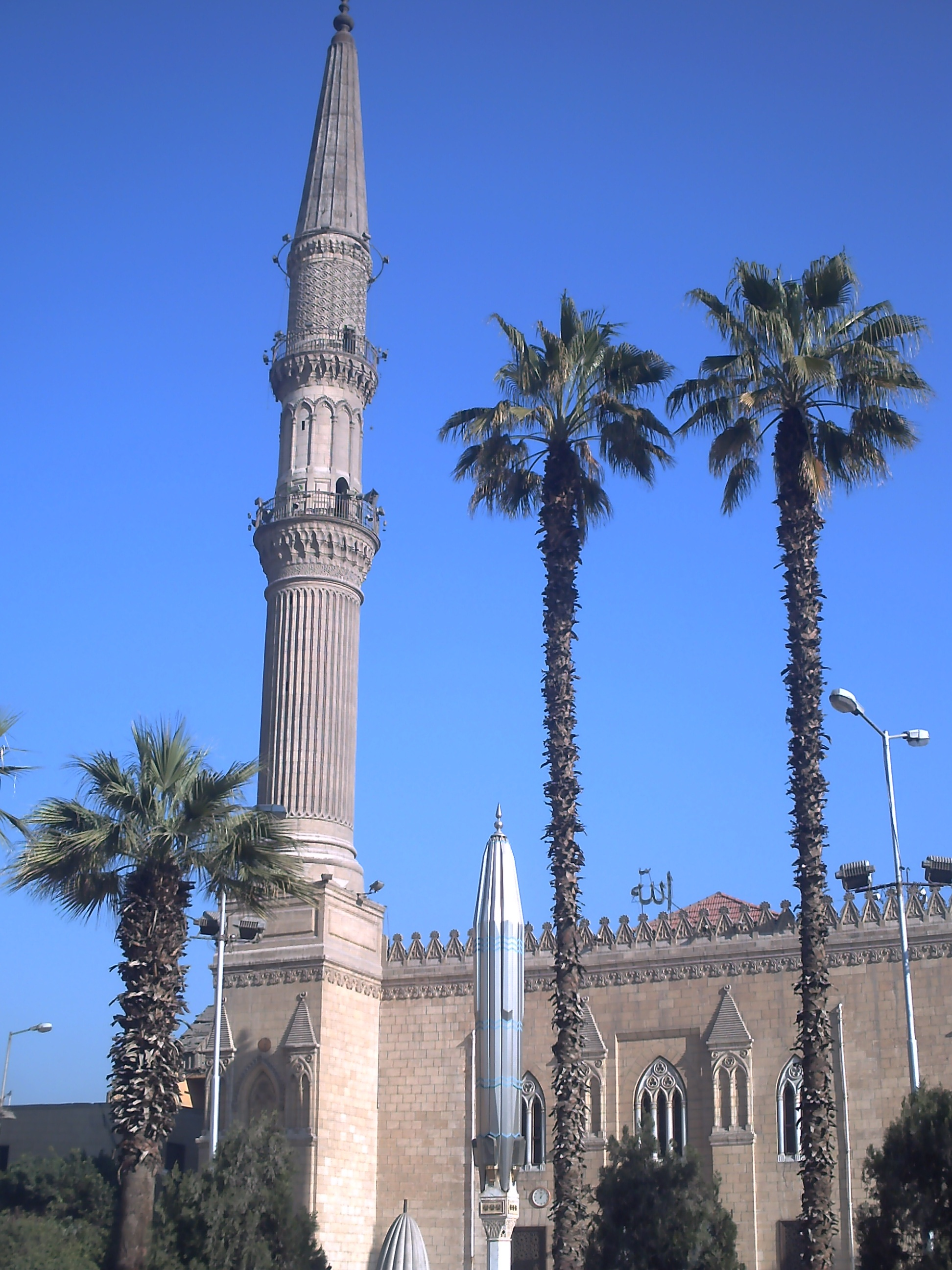
The Mosque of the Imam Al-Husayn, the grandson of the Islamic prophet Muhammed in Cairo

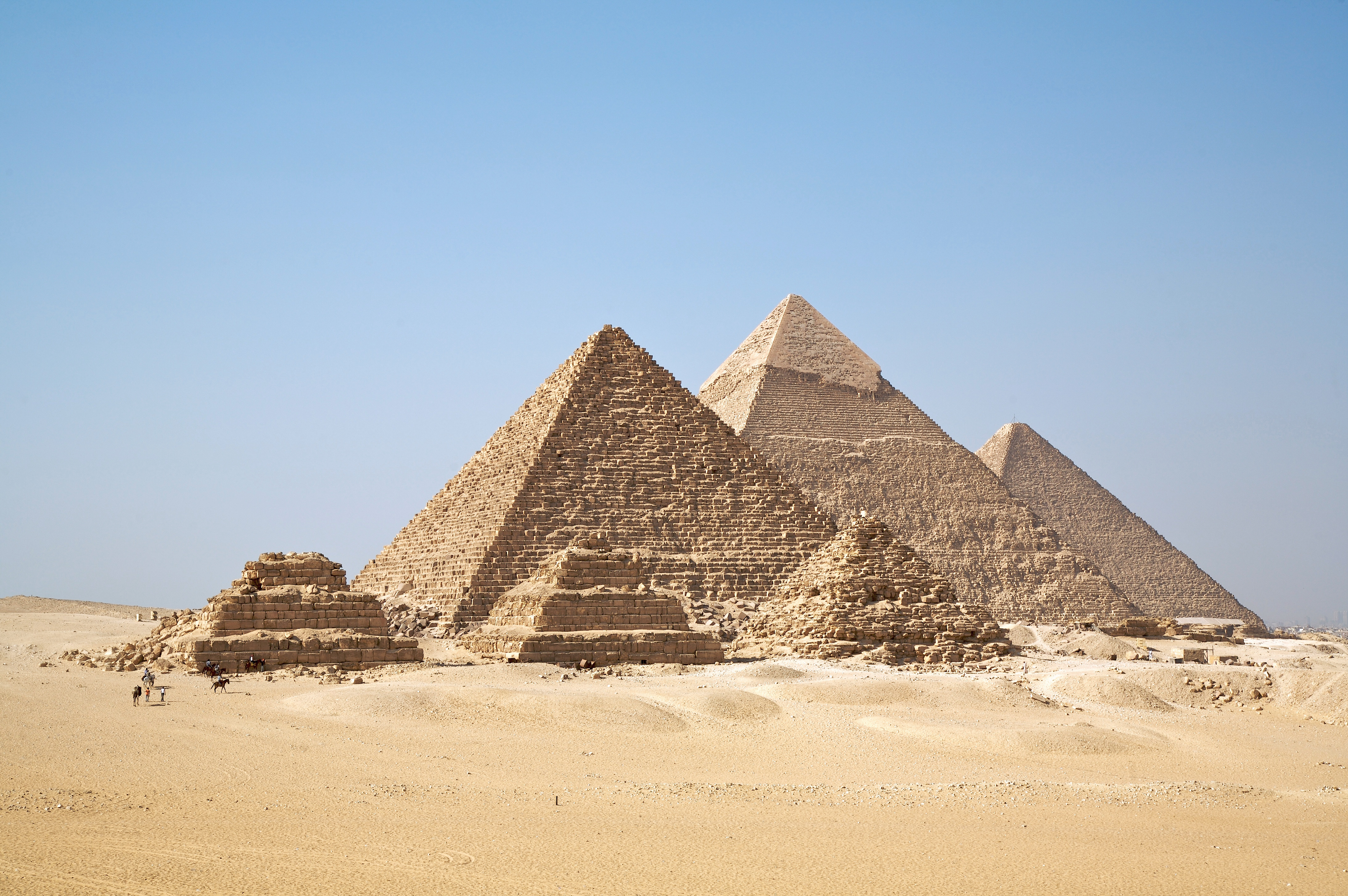
The Great Pyramids of Giza in Giza

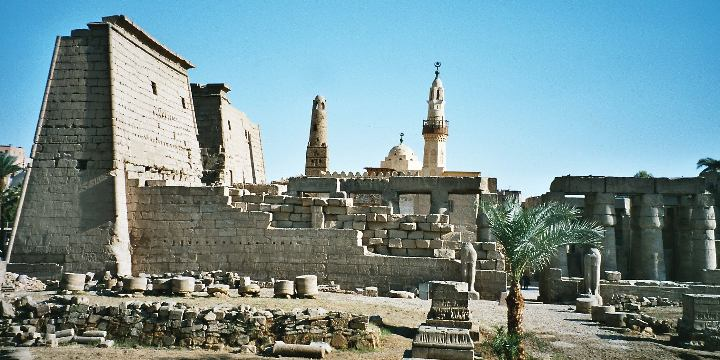
The Luxor Temple in Luxor

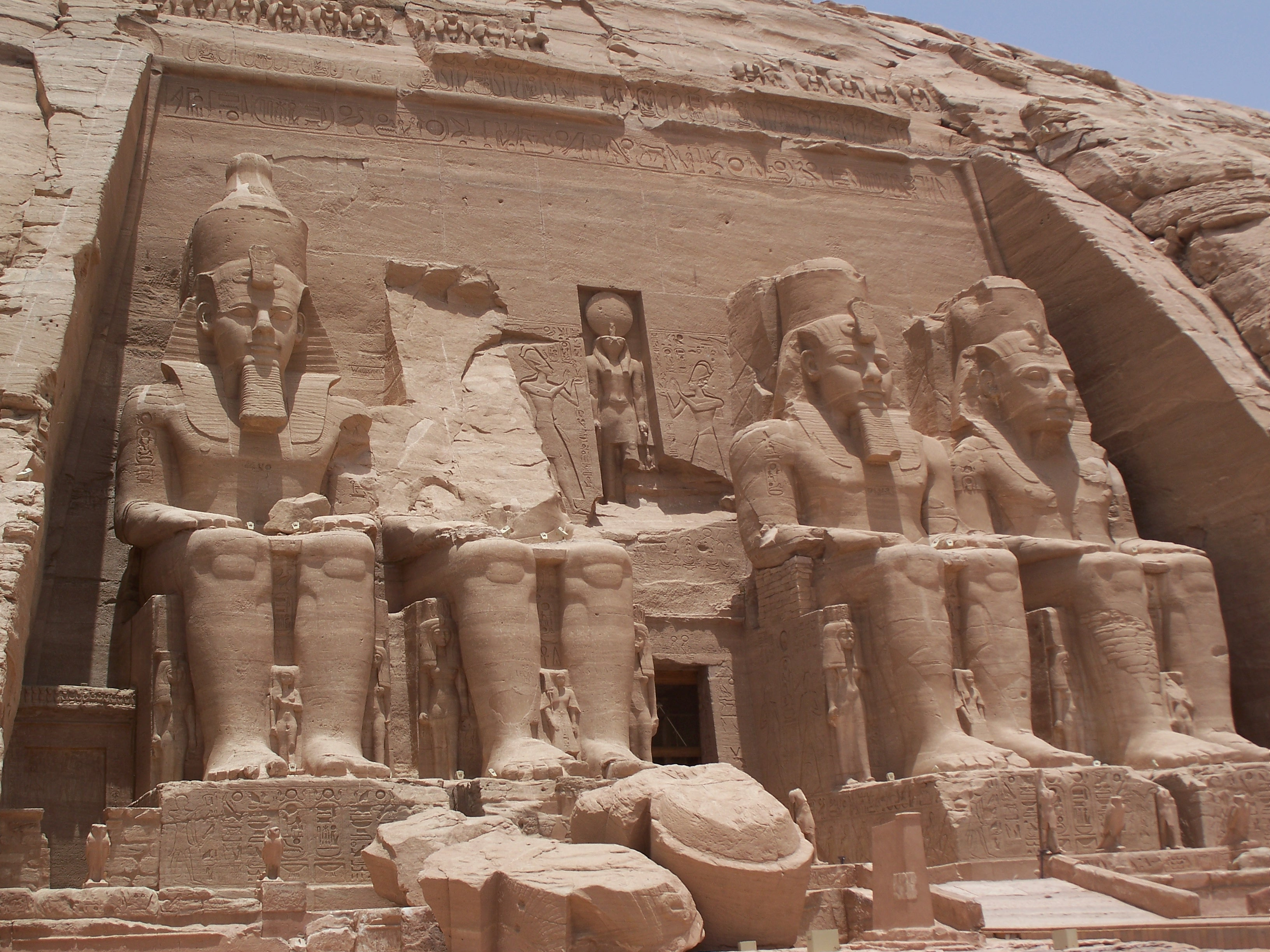
Temple of Ramesses II in Abu Simbel

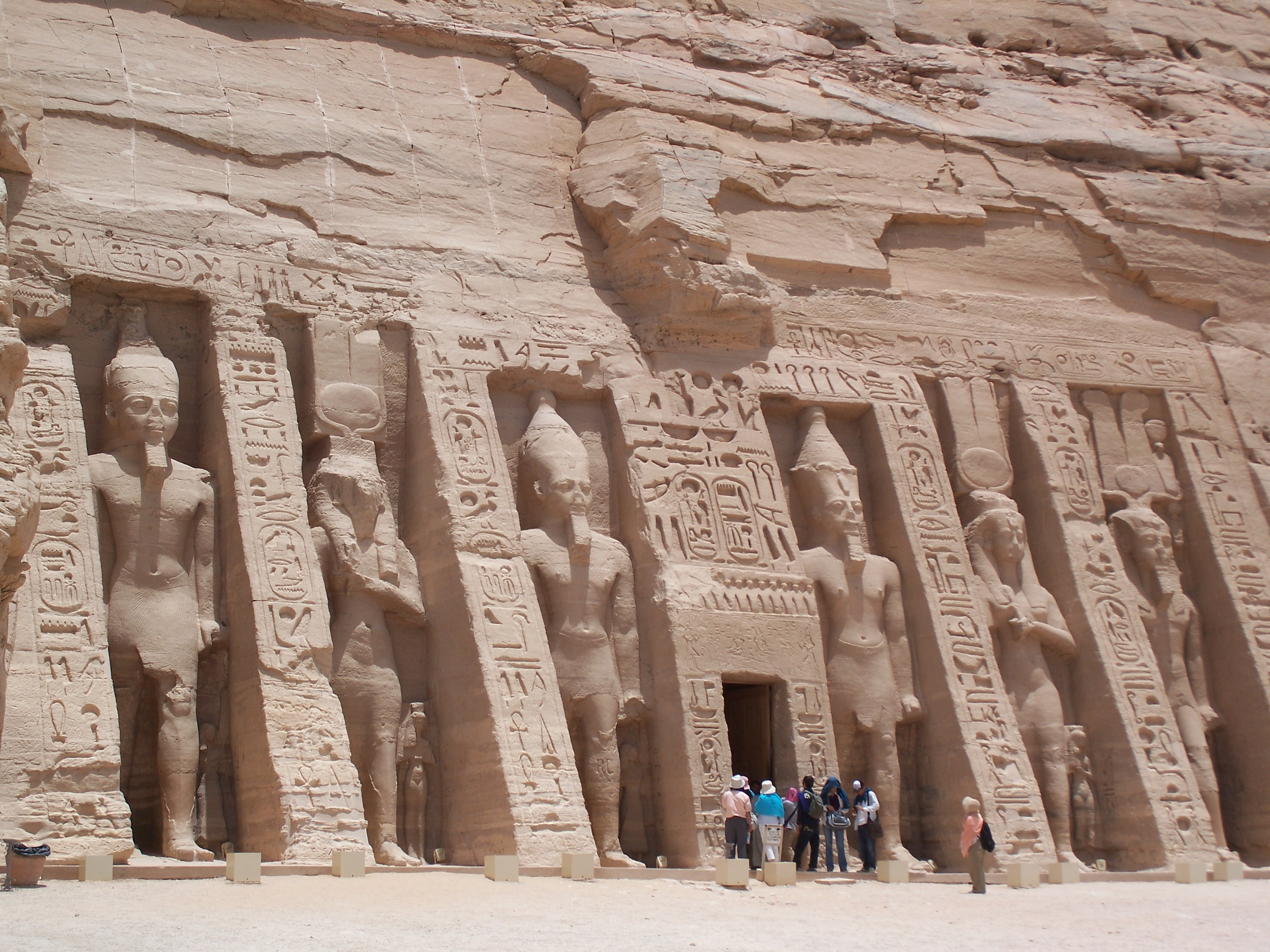
Temple of Nefertari in Abu Simbel

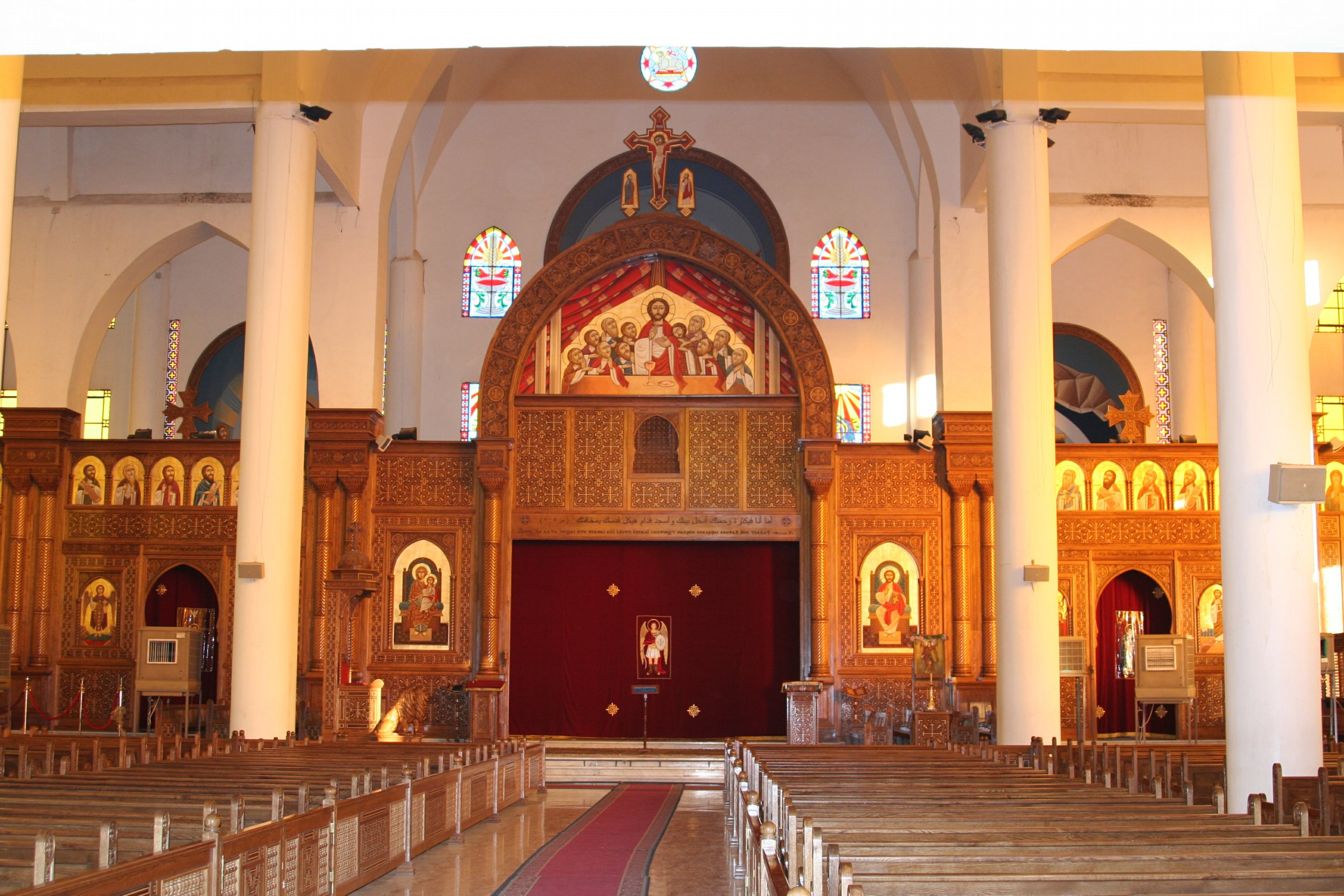
Archangel Michael's Coptic Orthodox Church in Coptic Style in Aswan

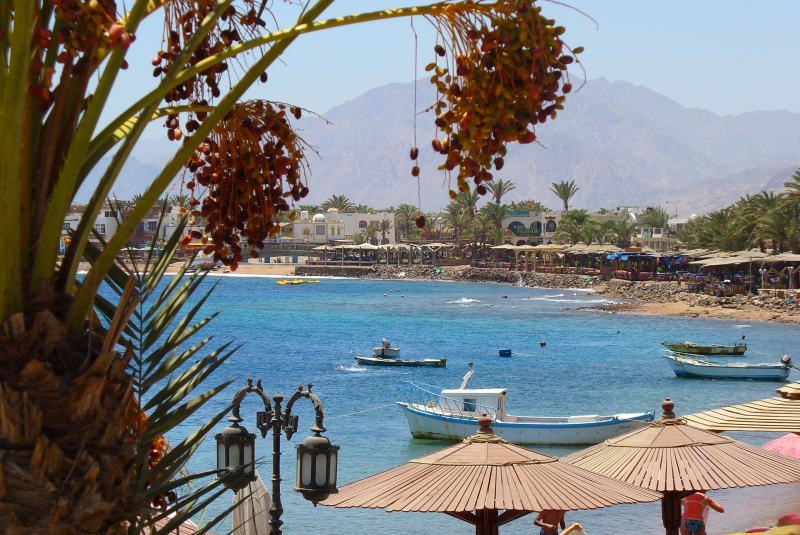
Dahab, Sinai is one of the popular beach and diving resorts in Egypt

== See also ==
- Cultural tourism in Egypt
- Visa policy of Egypt

== Sources ==
- Booth, Charlotte (2024-05-30). Tourism in Egypt Through the Ages: A Historical Guide. Pen and Sword History. ISBN 978-1-3990-4360-1.
- ECES (2025). "Egypt's Economic Profile and Statistics" (PDF). eces.org.eg. The Egyptian Center for Economic Studies.
- Wood, Janet (2011). Travel Egypt; Nile Cruise. M J Wood. ISBN 978-0-9548049-6-1.
