= Cairo attack =

Cairo attack may refer to:

- 1948 Cairo bombings
- Cairo–Haifa train bombings 1948
- 1981 Assassination of Anwar Sadat
- 1990 Cairo bus attack
- 1996 Cairo shooting
- April 2005 Cairo terrorist attacks
- February 2009 Cairo terrorist attacks
- 2011 Imbaba church attacks, near Cairo
- 2011 attack on the Israeli Embassy in Egypt
- January 2014 Cairo bombings
- 2015 Cairo restaurant fire
- 2015 Bombing of the Cairo Italian Consulate
- 2017 Attack on Saint Menas church, Cairo
- 2019 Cairo bombing

== See also ==
- Timeline of terrorism in Egypt (2013–present)
