= Crime in Egypt =

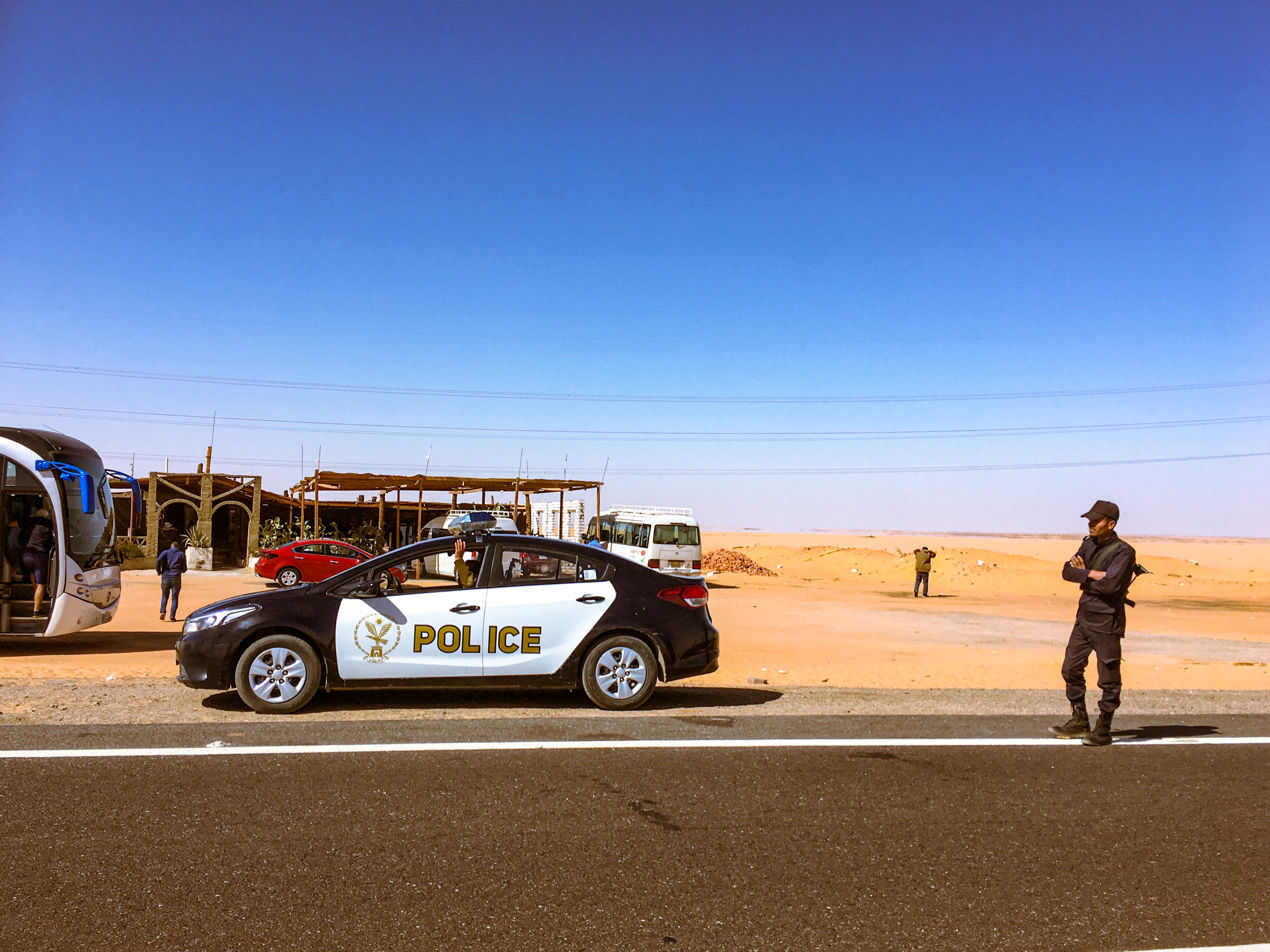
Egyptian Police vehicle in Aswan.

Crime in Egypt refers to criminal acts taking place in the territory of the Arab Republic of Egypt. Crime in Egypt is moderate, and occurs in various forms. A majority of crimes in Egypt are committed and reported in major population centers like Cairo, Giza, Alexandria, and Faiyum. The trafficking of humans, weapons, and drugs is one of the most problematic issues in the region.

== History ==
Legal systems in Egypt have changed with the rise and fall of regimes, and the gradual replacement of sharia law with European legal ideas. As a result criminal law and activities defined as crime have changed often over the last several hundred years, with the mixed courts instituted by colonial powers in Ottoman Egypt being regarded as a critical moment in Egypt's legal history.

=== Ottoman period (1517–1914 CE) ===
Crime in Ottoman Egypt is described as being efficient, with quick sentencing and punishment. Egypt's time under the Ottoman Empire includes the period when Egypt was under direct rule, and the rule of Muhammad Ali Pasha, when the Ottoman empire ruled only in name. Since the arrival of Islam in Egypt, sharia law has had a massive influence on criminal law and crime in the region. Under the Ottoman Empire citizens lived under the Hanafite school of jurisprudence, which follows sharia and proscribes the teachings of various scholarly figures to provide legal guidance in cases of wrongdoing. This school had several tiers of teachers, each having more authority than the teacher below him, so as to provide direction when the teachings of one scholar didn't apply to a case. Until later periods, said teachings were applied onto criminal cases by a Qadi, or regional judge, though the Sultan had the authority to intervene in ways he saw fit. The rule of the qadi was at times a liability, as Ottoman law relied not just on the crimes set forth in sharia and qanun, but also it left room for the qadi to enact punishment for perceived offenses that didn't fit into specifically codified definitions of crime. This power was eventually limited under the legal reforms set forth by Sultan Suleiman the Magnificent. Punishment of crimes during this period could range from simply being verbally reprimanded or fined, to beatings, amputations, and death. During this time period religious officials had special protections from punishment under the law, where they might suffer a verbal warning rather than physical harm.

=== Recent history (1950s–present) ===
Crime in Egypt since the country's transition to a republic in 1953 has lacked much recording, however the 1980's are denoted as having had a great increase in criminal activity. This included numerous kinds of nonviolent petty theft being extremely common in the larger cities, such as Cairo. In addition to this, crime in the Egyptian countryside during this time period was characterized by the breakdown of the rule of law, with victims working around established legal systems, to kill perpetrators for the sake of honor or revenge. Throughout the twentieth century and to the present day, one of the punishments available for a judge to apply to a convicted person is forced labor. This involves the condemned being sent to perform physical labor to complete government mandated projects. Egypt is also denoted as having a serious problem with white-collar crime (such as embezzlement, tax evasion, kickbacks, black marketeering, and bribery), especially under the regimes of Anwar El Sadat and Hosni Mubarak. Terrorism has also been a concern, with Egypt experiencing a spike in terrorist attacks from 2012-2018.

== Crime by type ==
=== Honor killing ===
An honor killing is the killing of an individual (often one's own family member) to protect a family's honor, and as such is often a form of domestic violence. A 2005 report states that between 1998 and 2001, 79% of honor killings in Egypt were done as a result of suspected adultery on behalf of the woman, and 41% of the killings being done by husbands, to their wives. The same report references an estimated 52 out of 819 murders reported in Egypt in 1995 being honor killings. Honor killings have historically not faced much legal punishment in Egypt, with certain penal codes in Egyptian law allowing for reduced penalties for those committing honor killings, depending on the judge's discretion. Egyptian law also contains measures to reduce the penalties for an honor crime, with men who can prove infidelity receiving lighter sentences. An example of this crime can be seen in a court case from 2024, where an Egyptian man was convicted of murdering his sister, and was eventually sentenced to 15 years in prison, after an appeals process. During the court hearing, the mother of the perpetrator and the victim attempted to renounce her daughters rights, with the judge responding "Is he Allah to judge her?".

=== Petty crime ===
During the 1980s, petty crime was a significant problem in Egypt, but has been declining since then. Motor vehicle theft, crime by women and juveniles, and incidents of kidnappings increased in Cairo in 1988. In an interview in 1989, the director of security for Cairo blamed poor economic conditions, high unemployment, population growth, and changes in social norms as the reasons behind these higher crime rates.

=== Corruption ===
Corruption represents a massive problem for the Egyptian government, with many anti-corruption measures lacking adequate strength. To fight corruption, Anwar El Sadat established commissions in the 1970s for the investigation of corruption among government officials. Hosni Mubarak, who made it a priority to target corruption, later continued anti-corruption efforts by replacing many cabinet members who failed to detect corruption. Another measure Mubarak took was to replace the Minister of Interior at the time with Major General Hasan Sulayman Abu Basha, who was expected to take a hardline approach on corruption. Anti-corruption sentiments came to a head among the Egyptian public in 2011, when Egyptians started mass anti-government protests amidst the Arab Spring. A 2017 report discusses corruption levels in Egypt to several other countries, including both immediate neighbors and more distant European ones. In this report, Egypt is rated as less corrupt than Angola, but more corrupt than Tunisia or the United Arab Emirates, which also underwent the Arab Spring. The same report also concludes that part of the reason why anti-corruption efforts haven't borne fruit in Egypt is because anti-corruption forces focus too much on large news-worthy instances of corruption, and less on more local, petty ones.

Law enforcement has also been reported to be dangerously corrupt, making affiliations with tuktuk and taxi drivers break traffic laws for a charge. Also, making false warrants and unlawful arrests on suspects who are involved in cases filed by paying rivals.

=== Sexual violence ===
Sexual violence has been a recurrent problem in Egypt, with rape being one of the most common crimes in Egypt. The Egyptian Centre for Women's Rights (ECWR) has called the problem "social cancer" and suggested that dress code is no deterrent at all. A 2013 United Nations report on Egypt states that 99.3% of women who responded reported sexual harassment, with incidents of female genital mutilation also being very high. Despite these high rates, incidences of sexual crimes in the nation usually go unreported due to shame on the victim's part. Sexual violence against women in Egypt has led to numerous forms of protest, and efforts to protect women from sexual violence include protections set aside in Egypt's 2014 constitution, as well as harsher penalties for breaking laws regarding sexual violence.

Mass rapes have also been known to occur in Egypt, and take the form of the public rapes of women. Two notable instances of this are the sexual assaults of female journalists Lara Logan and Caroline Sinz.

=== Drug trafficking ===
Egypt is a party to the 1961, 1971, and 1988 international drug control conventions. The use of narcotics such as opium and hashish has been present in Egypt for hundreds of years. However, as of the 1980s, drug use in Egypt has been a massive problem, with a 2003 report stating that combating narcotics was costing Egypt roughly $800 million a year, and an older 1989 report stating that up to 2 million Egyptians were users of illegal drugs. Some drugs commonly trafficked in Egypt are cannabis, heroin, and opium, with the final destination of many of these drugs being Israel, Europe, and other countries in North Africa. The production of drugs is also a problem in Egypt, with the northern region of the Sinai peninsula being home to opium poppy and cannabis farms.

=== Human trafficking ===
Egypt serves as a transit country for women trafficked from Eastern Europe to Israel for commercial sexual exploitation. Men and women from countries in sub-Saharan Africa and Asia are believed to be trafficked through the Sinai Desert to Israel and Europe for labor. In addition to this, victims of human trafficking in Egypt are likely to be Egyptian children trafficked to other areas in Egypt to be put into forced labor such as cleaning, farming, or performing delivery services. Children specifically are targeted for these purposes, especially children living on the street, of which there are an estimated 2 million living in Egypt. In addition to the above types of labor victims of human trafficking have been subjected to, children are especially likely to engage in begging as a form of forced labor. An example of this would be a child being exploited by a criminal organization begging for the day, giving any money they received to those they are being trafficked by. Another one of the purposes of human trafficking in Egypt is for organ trafficking and harvesting, with Egypt being a major exporter in the human organ trade. With the spread of COVID-19, human trafficking rates temporarily lessened in Egypt with the Egyptian government implementing increased border controls and restricting travel.

=== Terrorism and religious violence ===
Egypt's history with religious violence and terrorism includes infrequent attacks on tourists, religious minorities, and civilians. Notable examples include the Luxor massacre (1997), the 2004 Sinai bombings, the 2005 attacks in Cairo and in Sharm el-Sheikh, the 2006 Dahab bombings, the 2011 Alexandria bombing, and the August 2012 Sinai attack. Following the 2013 political crisis, major attacks included: the Sinai insurgency, the 2014 Taba bus bombing, the 2015 Metrojet Flight 9268 bombing, the 2016 Botroseya Church bombing, the 2017 Palm Sunday church bombings, the 2017 Minya bus attack, and the 2017 Sinai mosque attack, which is the deadliest attack in Egyptian history. Roughly 100,000 terrorist attacks have been reported in the Middle East since the year 2000, claiming about 240,000 victims. Egypt suffered about 2,100 of those, with 4,200 deaths. Cairo and other areas of the Nile Delta are common targets for terrorist activity in Egypt, with tourists, government personnel, and Coptic Christians being common targets of attacks. Terrorist incidents declined significantly following sustained military operations, particularly after 2017, though sporadic attacks in the Sinai Peninsula continued in subsequent years. In early 2023, Egyptian authorities reported no terrorist attacks for the first time in over a decade, reflecting the significant degradation of ISIS-Sinai Province's operational capacity.

== Crime in Egyptian popular culture ==
Crime is a major theme in Egyptian popular culture, with foundations lying in sensationalized cases such as that of Raya and Sakina, a pair of sisters whose crimes were sensationalized by the newspaper Al-Ahrām. A popular theme in crime novels in Egyptian culture is a lack of faith in the due process of law, and a weariness of the legal system and the bureaucracy, as seen in The Thief and the Dogs or Diary of a Country Prosecutor.
