= February 2009 Cairo terrorist attacks =

Terrorist incidents in Egypt

Coordinates: 30.048°N 31.262°E

The February 2009 Cairo terrorist attacks were three incidents that took place in Cairo, Egypt from 22 February 2009 to 28 February 2009. Of three attacks, only the first was fatal, resulting in the death of a 17-year-old French teenager. The attacks appeared to have been directed variously at foreign tourists and Egyptian nationals alike. None of the attacks was described by Egyptian security officials as sophisticated. The motivation of at least two of the attacks was not clear, but the spate of violence came amid heightened tension following the 2008-2009 Israel-Gaza conflict, during which Egyptians had protested against their government's closure of the Rafah Border Crossing.

== First incident: Khan el-Khalili bombing ==
At 18:30 local time on 22 February 2009, a bomb exploded in Khan el-Khalili, a souq in eastern Cairo.

The attack took place just after dark in front of a cafe crowded with people gathering to watch a televised football match. There were conflicting reports that the bomb was thrown from a balcony or from a motorcycle, but security officials reported that the bomb had exploded under a bench in a garden in the square. A second bomb failed to detonate and was defused. The bombs weighed 1.5 kilograms (3.3 lb) and contained nails and metal fragments. A 17-year-old French girl, who was among a group of 54 teenagers from Levallois-Perret, near Paris, was killed. 17 French, one German and three Saudi tourists, as well as three Egyptians, were wounded. Early reports suggested the explosive devices were "primitive".

According to security sources, there was no immediate claim of responsibility by any militant group, but three suspects had been taken into custody.

== Second incident: Khan el-Khalili stabbing ==
On 28 February 2009, an American teacher walking through Khan el-Khalili was stabbed by an Egyptian man. The victim, who taught science at the American School of Alexandria in Alexandria, Egypt, received superficial stab wounds to the face.

Police quickly arrested a 46-year-old Egyptian laborer, Abdel Rahman Saleh Taher Mohammed (Arabic: عبد الرحمن صالح طاهر محمّد), whose motive was quoted by the Egyptian state-owned news agency MENA as being a "hatred for foreigners because of the Israeli offensive in Gaza". It was subsequently revealed that the suspect had been detained in a mental hospital in 2000 for assaults on tourists and police officers.

== Third incident: Metro bombing ==
Later on 28 February 2009, at least one firebomb was thrown from a bridge at a passing train on the Cairo Metro. The attack took place near to the Line 1 station of Helmiet El-Zaitoun, near Ain Shams in north-eastern Cairo. The perpetrators fled the scene, and witness reports identified the suspects variously as a single man or two boys. No one appeared to be hurt, and the incendiary devices may have failed to detonate.

== See also ==
- 2004 Sinai bombings
- April 2005 Cairo terrorist attacks
- 2005 Sharm el-Sheikh attacks
- 2006 Dahab bombings
- 2009 Khan el-Khalili bombing
