= 2009 Khan el-Khalili bombing =

Bombing in Egypt

Coordinates: 30°2′N 31°15′E

Khan el-Khalili bombing
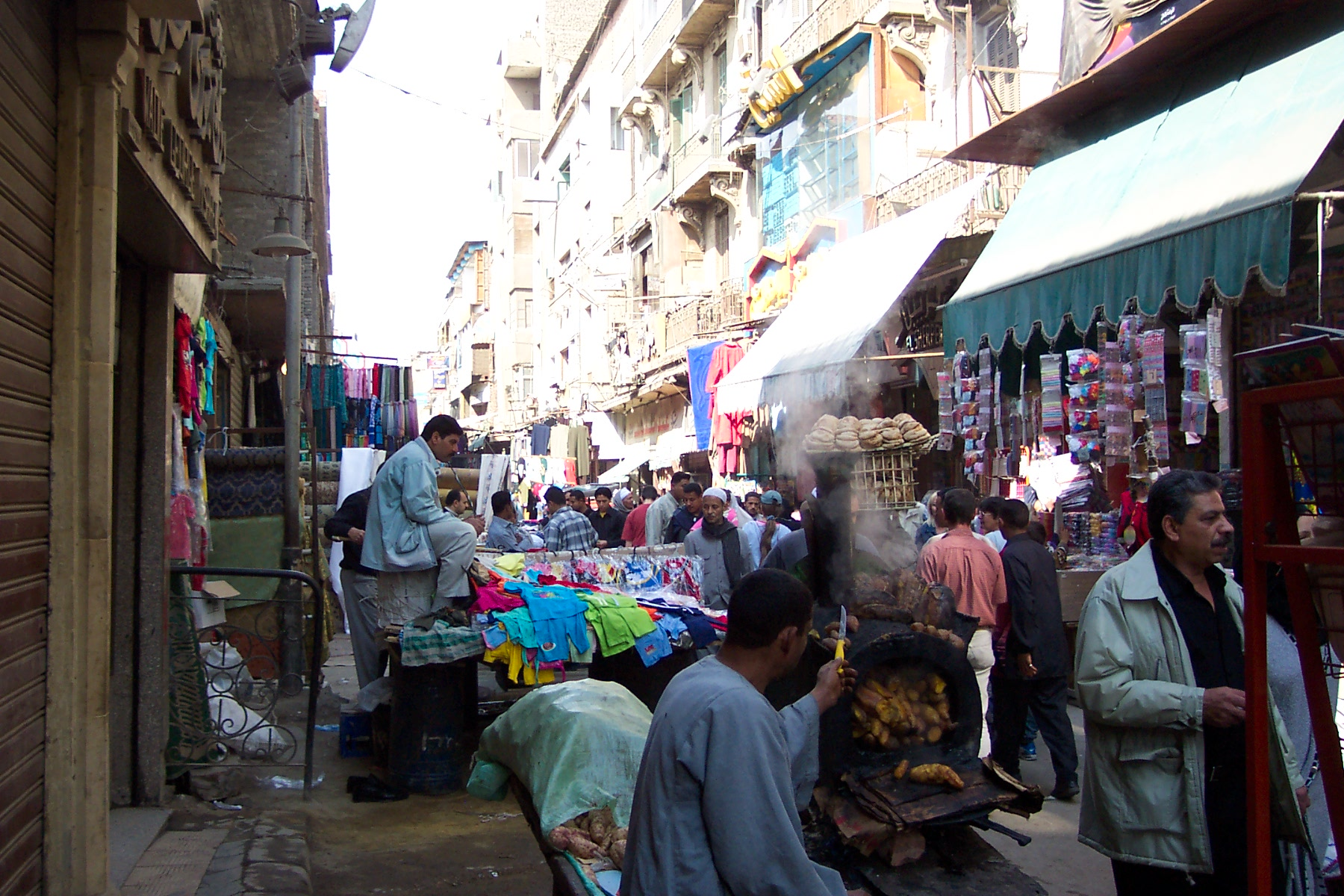
- A street scene in Khan el-Khalili
- Location: Khan el-Khalili, Cairo, Egypt
- Date: 22 February 2009
- Deaths: 1
- Injuries: 24
- Perpetrator: Unknown

The 2009 Khan el-Khalili bombing was a terrorist attack that took place at 6:30 p.m. local time on 22 February 2009 in Khan el-Khalili, a souq in eastern Cairo, Egypt, killing a 17-year-old French teenager and injuring 24 other people. It was the first of the February 2009 Cairo terrorist attacks.

== Attack details ==
The attack took place just after dark in front of a cafe crowded with people gathering to watch a televised football match. There were conflicting reports that the bomb was thrown from a balcony or from a motorcycle, but security officials reported that the bomb had exploded under a bench in a garden in the square. A second bomb failed to detonate and was defused.

The bombs weighed 1.5 kilograms (3.3 lb) and contained nails and metal fragments. A 17-year-old French girl, who was among a group of 54 teenagers from Levallois-Perret near Paris, was killed. Seventeen French, one German and three Saudi tourists, as well as three Egyptians, were wounded. Early reports suggest the explosive devices were "primitive".

== Responsibility ==
According to security sources, there was no immediate claim of responsibility by any militant group, but three suspects had been taken into custody.

== Reactions ==
Then French President Nicolas Sarkozy and then Prime Minister François Fillon condemned the attacks.

The attack has raised fear of the return of the Islamic militants groups to target Egypt's tourism industry. The attacks were also speculated to be linked to anger over Egypt's role in the Gaza conflict. The bombing caused concern for Cairo authorities, who saw the tourist industry devastated by bombings and shootings by Islamic militants in the 1990s.

Hotels' revenues and occupancy rates fell resulting in the dismissal of workers.

== See also ==
- 2004 Sinai bombings
- April 2005 Cairo terrorist attacks
- 2005 Sharm el-Sheikh attacks
- 2006 Dahab bombings
- February 2009 Cairo terrorist attacks
