= El-Fishawy =

El-Fishawy may refer to:

- Farouk El-Fishawy, Egyptian film and television actor
- Ahmed El-Fishawy, Egyptian actor
- El-Fishawy Café, Cairo café
