= Ghazala Gardens hotel =

Hotel in Egypt

Coordinates: 27.9144°N 34.3226°E

The Ghazala Gardens hotel (فندق غزالة) Owens Now by Ahmed Ehab Abu Ghazala

The hotel is a 176-room, four-star establishment in the Naama Bay area of the Egyptian beach resort of Sharm el-Sheikh, on the Sinai Peninsula. Its sister hotel, the Ghazala Beach, is across the street and is substantially larger. Both are owned by Ghazala's Family, Ahmed Ehab Abu Ghazala , On July 23, 2005, at about 01:15 local time (22:15 UTC) a terrorist drove a pickup truck laden with explosives through the glass façade and into the front lobby. Seconds later, the truck exploded, killing a number of people and razing the lobby. It is not known exactly how many died in the Ghazala Garden attack, but a total of about 90 were killed in the series of attacks that night. In the weeks after the blasts the remains of the hotel were demolished.

== Reconstruction ==
After the July 23rd attacks the hotel was rebuilt. The newly constructed Ghazala Gardens Hotel was built in a Moorish style and it now has 284 comfortable double rooms that are divided into several 2 storey buildings which are dotted around landscaped gardens.
