= April 2005 Cairo terrorist attacks =

Terror attacks in Egypt

Three related attacks took place in Cairo, Egypt, on 7 and 30 April 2005. While the first killed three bystanders, the latter two incidents are generally considered to have been minor, in that they caused no loss of life other than those of the perpetrators and appear not to have been planned. Neither sophisticated methods nor sophisticated materials were used in the incidents, and the Egyptian authorities have consistently described the attacks as "primitive".

== First incident: Khan el-Khalili ==
Building damaged by the April 7 blast.

On Thursday, 7 April 2005, a suicide bomber detonated an explosive device on Sharia al-Moski in Islamic Cairo, near the al-Hussein Mosque and Khan el-Khalili, a major souq popular with tourists and Egyptians alike. Three foreign tourists (two French and one American) [(Alex Mirandette)] were killed, and 11 Egyptians and seven other overseas visitors were injured.

Egyptian police identified the bomber as Muhammad Sobhi Ali Jidan, originally from Qalyubia Governorate in northern Egypt, but then living in the north Cairo district of Shobra.

== Second incident: The Sixth of October Bridge ==
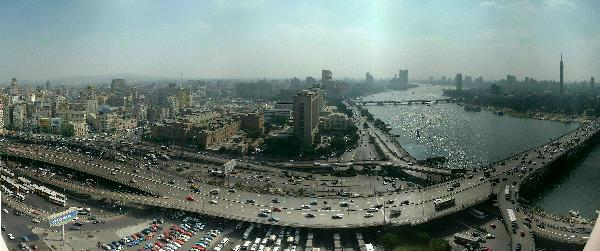
The Sixth of October Bridge

The first of a number of attacks on Saturday, 30 April took place at 15h15 Egypt summer time (12h15 UTC) in a city bus station located in a 300-metre-wide concourse between the Ramses Hilton Hotel and the Egyptian Museum near Cairo's main traffic intersection.

Ehab Yousri Yassin, an Egyptian man suspected of involvement in the 7 April attack, was being pursued along the Sixth of October Bridge, a flyover leading into centre of Cairo from the River Nile island of Gezira. He apparently leapt from the bridge down into the bus station below, with a nail bomb that he was carrying detonating as he fell. The bomber was killed and seven passersby were injured: three Egyptians and four foreign tourists (an Israeli couple, an Italian woman, and a Swede).

== Third incident: The Citadel ==
Approximately two hours later the same day, two veiled females armed with guns opened fire on a tourist bus in the neighbourhood known as Islamic Cairo, not far from the Citadel. After firing on the coach, one of the women shot the other dead before turning her gun on herself. Three bystanders were reportedly injured.

Police sources later revealed that the women were Negat Yassin, Ehab Yousri Yassin's sister, and Iman Ibrahim Khamis, his wife (described as his fiancée in some early reports). This was the first attack in modern Egyptian history to be carried out by women; police believe it arose from a spur of the moment decision taken by the women upon learning of the Sixth of October Bridge incident.

== Casualties ==
Victims by nationality
Country	Deaths	Injured
France	2	0
United States	1	0
Egypt	0	16
Israel	0	2
Italy	0	1
Sweden	0	1
Total	3	20

== Aftermath ==
Two groups claimed responsibility in the early evening hours, local time: the Mujahedeen of Egypt and the Abdullah Azzam Brigades. In its statement, the latter group said the attacks were in retaliation for the government's clampdown on dissidents in the wake of the Sinai Peninsula bombings of October 2004.

In the early hours of Sunday, 1 May, security forces arrested some 225 individuals for questioning, mostly from the dead three's home villages and from the area where they lived in Shubra. Particularly keenly sought was Muhammad Yassin, the teenage brother of Ehab Yousri Yassin, whom the police described as the only remaining suspect in the bazaar bomb attack and a material witness to the Saturday afternoon shooting. Muhammad was later extradited from Libya.

Over the course of the weekend, it also emerged that all three of the attackers involved in the attacks were relatives of Ashraf Said, a suspect in the 7 April bombing who was taken in for questioning and died in police custody on Friday, 29 April.

On August 20, 2007, four suspects were sentenced to life in prison for their role in the attacks. Five others received shorter jail sentences.

On March 9, 2007, one of the American victims published a book (The Only Road North) of his party's exploits in Africa which culminates in the tragic events of April 7, 2005.

== See also ==
- 2004 Sinai bombings, October 7, 2004
- Sharm el-Sheikh bombings, July 23, 2005
- 2006 Dahab bombings, April 24, 2006
- 2009 Khan el-Khalili explosion, February 22, 2009
