= Al-Hussein Mosque =

Mosque in Cairo, Egypt

- مسجد الإمام ٱلحُسين
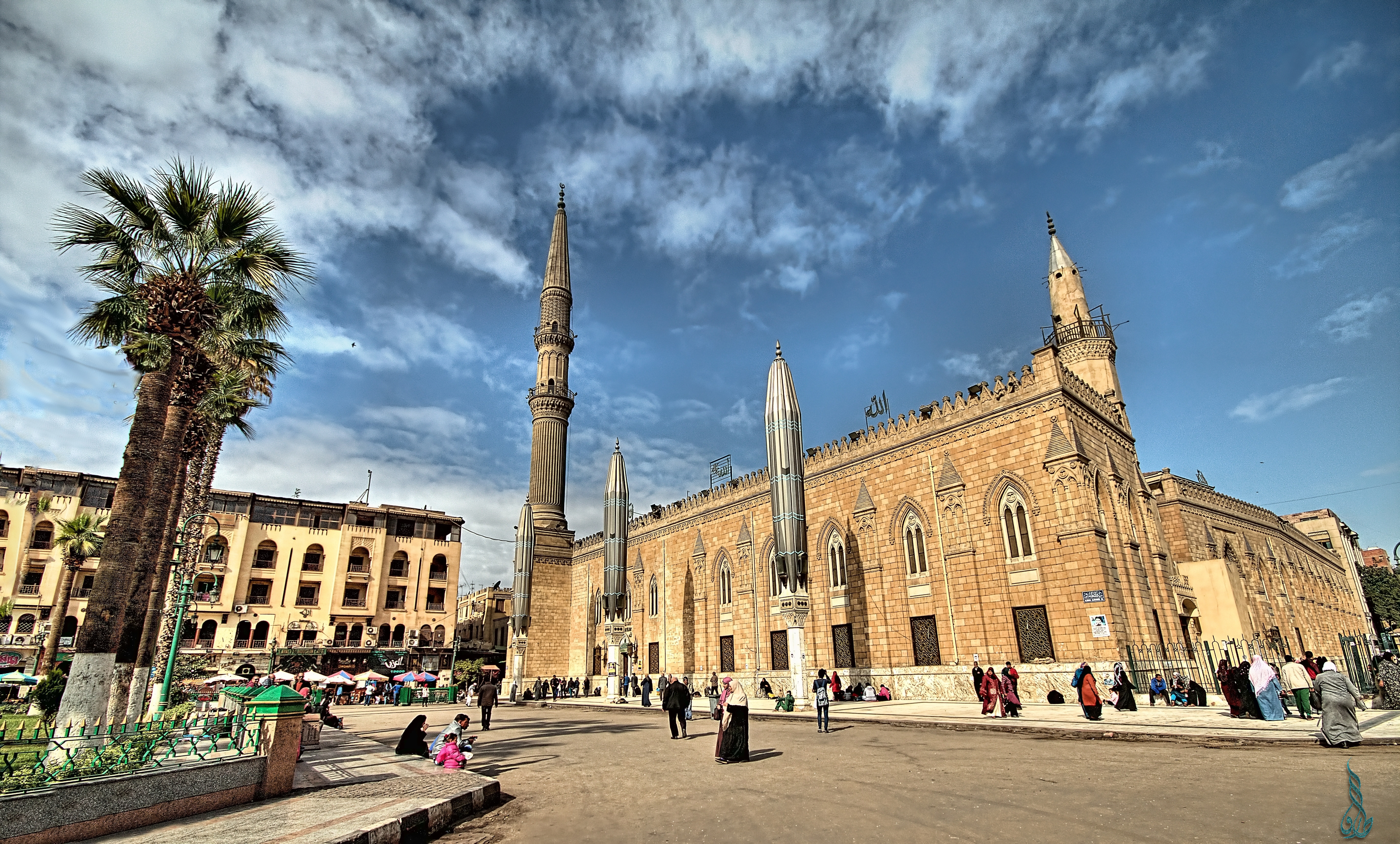

Religion
- Affiliation: Islam
- Ecclesiastical or organisational status: Mosque; Mausoleum
- Status: Active

Location
- Location: Khan El-Khalili, Cairo
- Country: Egypt
- Interactive map of Al-Hussein Mosque
- Coordinates: 30°2′52″N 31°15′47″E

Architecture
- Type: Mosque
- Style: Gothic Revival; Fatimid; Ayyubid; Ottoman; Islamic eclecticism
- Founder: Isma'il Pasha
- Completed: 1154 CE (original); 1874 (reconstruction)
- Destroyed: 1248 CE (by fire)

Specifications
- Dome: 1
- Minaret: 1

The al-Hussein Mosque (Arabic: مسجد الإمام ٱلحُسين) (Note: In addition to al-Hussein Mosque, other spellings or variations of the name include: al-Husayn Mosque, Mosque of al-Imam al-Husayn and Mosque of Sayyidna al-Husayn.) is a mosque and mausoleum, located near the Khan el-Khalili bazaar in Cairo, Egypt. Containing the tomb of Husayn ibn Ali that was originally built in 1154, the mosque and mausoleum were reconstructed in 1874. The mosque is located adjacent to the famous Al Azhar Mosque, in an area known as Al-Hussain, and is considered to be one of the holiest Islamic sites in Egypt. Some Shias believe that Husayn's head (ra's mubarak) is buried on the grounds of the mosque where a shrine currently stands.

== History ==
=== Fatimid period ===
According to Fatimid tradition, in the year 985 CE, the fifth Fatimid caliph, al-Aziz Billah, located the site of his great-grandfather's head through the office of a contemporary in Baghdad. It remained buried in the Shrine of Husayn's Head in Palestine for approximately 250 years, until 1153 CE. It was "rediscovered" in 1091 at a time when Badr al-Jamali, the vizier and de facto regent under Caliph al-Mustansir, had just reconquered the region for the Fatimid Caliphate. Upon his order, the construction of a new Friday mosque and mashhad (memorial shrine) was initiated at the site.

Due to the advance of the Crusaders, Caliph al-Zafir ordered the transfer of the head to Cairo. Husayn's casket was unearthed and moved from Ashkelon to Cairo on Sunday 8 Jumada al-Thani, 548 AH (31 August 1153 CE).

Hadith inscribed at Al-Hussein Mosque.

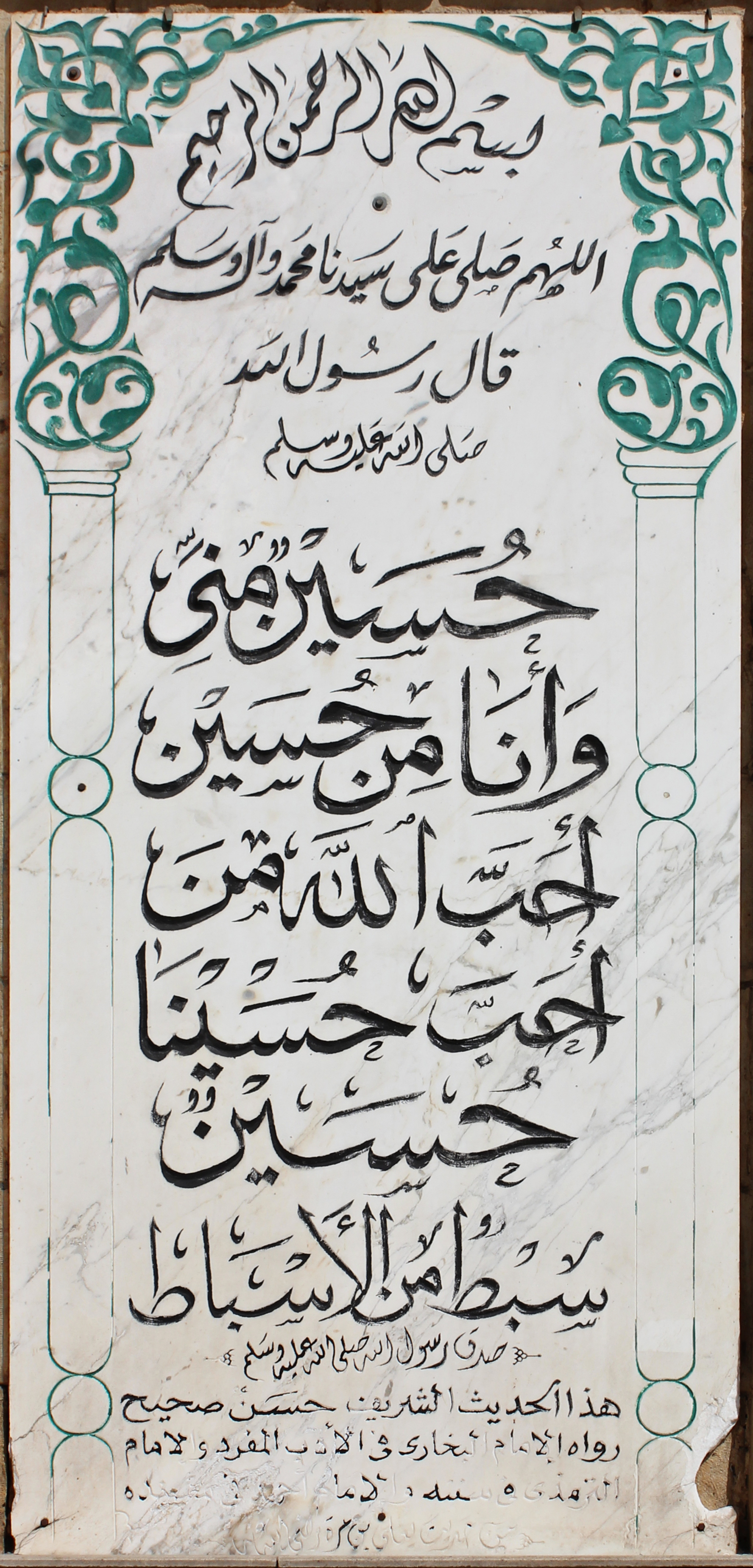
- Bismillah al-Rahman al-Rahim
- Blessings of God and peace be on our Master Muhammad and his kin.
- The messenger of God, peace be upon him, said:
- Husayn is of me, and I'm from him.
- He who loves Husayn shall be loved by God.
- Husayn is one of my branches.
- "The messenger of God surely spoke the truth"
- This Hadith is hasan sahīh.
- Related by Imam Bukhari in his work Al-Adab Al-Mufrad, Imam Tirmidhi in his Sunan and Imam Ahmad in his Musnad. From the Hadith of Ya'lā bin Murra (may God be pleased with him).

According to historians al-Maqrizi, Ahmad al-Qalqashandi, and Ibn Muyassar, the casket reached Cairo on Tuesday 10 Jumada al-Thani (2 September 1153). Taken by boat to the Kafuri (Garden), the casket was buried there in a place called Qubbat al-Daylam or Turbat al Zafr'an (currently known as al-Mashhad al-Hussaini or B'ab Mukhallaf'at al-Rasul). All Fatimid Imam-Caliphs, from Abdullah Al Mahdi to Al-Amir bi-Ahkami l-Lah, were buried at Turbah al-Zafaran, in the vicinity of the mosque and of the main Fatimid Palaces.

The vizier Tala'i ibn Ruzzik subsequently intended for the head to be moved to a new mosque and shrine he purposely built in 1160 (the Mosque of al-Salih Tala'i, south of Bab Zuwayla), but this transfer never occurred.

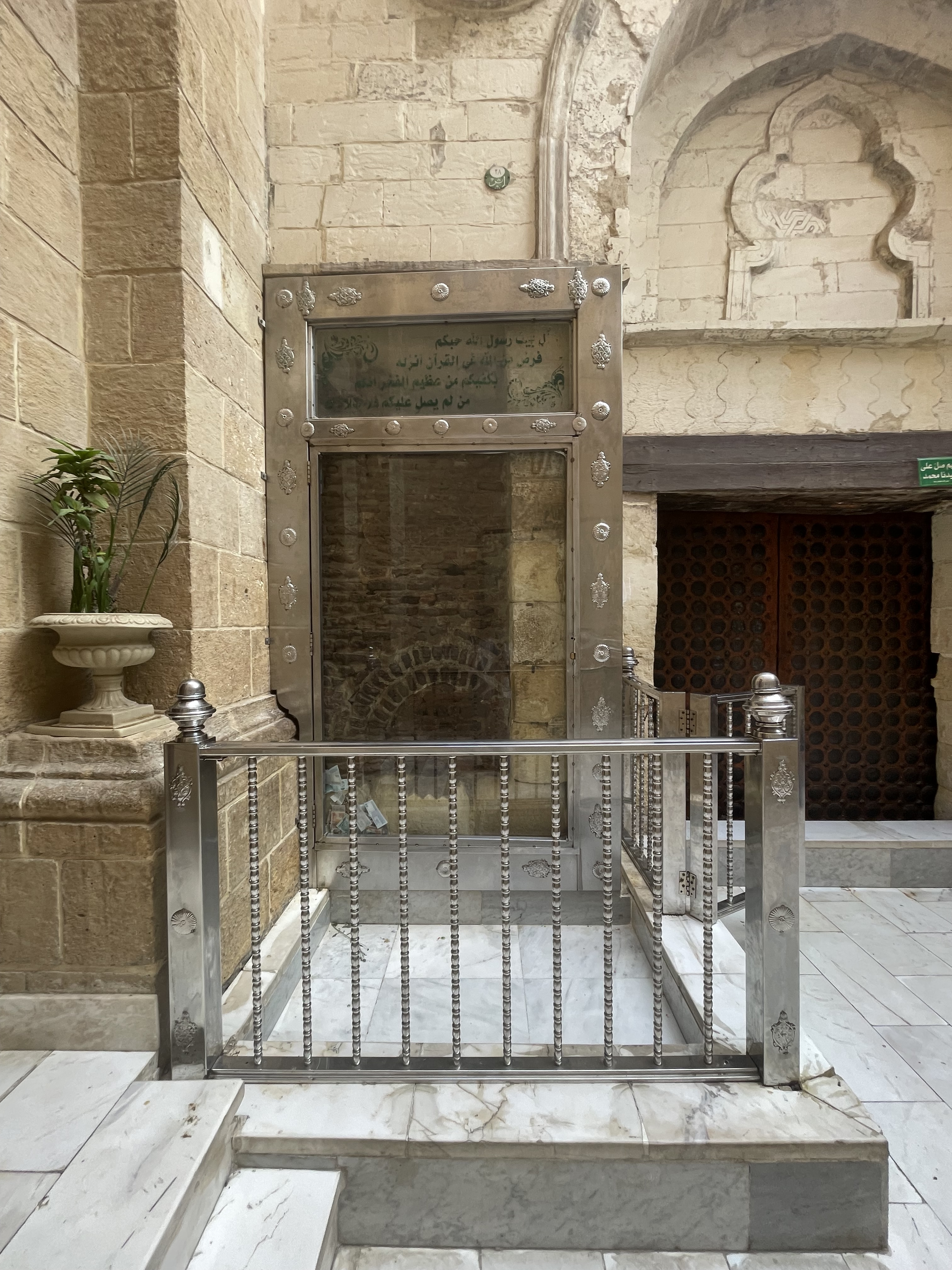
The closest point to the Head of Imam al-Husayn, next to the Bab al-Akhdar

=== Ayyubid period ===
The building was reconstructed during the Ayyubid period in 1237 but was destroyed by fire eleven years later. The Ayyubid minaret above the Bab al-Akhdar Gate is the only surviving element of the Ayyubid mosque today.

Regarding one of the "custodians" who brought Husayn's casket to Cairo, the famous Mamluk historian of Egypt, Mohiyuddin Abd al-Zahir, wrote:

"When Salahuddin came to power he seized all the Palaces of the Aimmat Fatemiyeen and looted their properties and treasures. He destroyed the valuable and rare collection of hundreds of thousands of books available in libraries, along the river Nile. When he learned through his intelligence agents that one of the custodians of Raas al Imam al Husain was highly respected by the people of the city of Qahera, he surmised that perhaps he would be aware of the treasures of the Aimmat Fatemiyeen. Salahuddin issued orders to present him in his court. He inquired of him the whereabouts of the Fatemi treasures. The nobleman flatly denied any knowledge of the treasures. Salahuddin was angered, and ordered his intelligence agents to ask him through 'third-degree-torture', but the nobleman bore the torture and repeated his previous statement that he knew nothing of any treasures. Salahuddin ordered his soldiers to put a cap containing centipedes on the head of the nobleman, such a type of punishment was so severe and unbearable that none could survive even for a few minutes.

"Prior to putting the Cap of Centipedes on the head, his hair was shaved, to make it easy for the centipedes to suck blood, which in turn made holes in [his] skull. In spite of that punishment the noble custodian of Husain's Head felt no pain at all. Salahuddin ordered more centipedes to be put on the nobleman's head, but it could not kill or pain him. Finally, Salahuddin Ayyubi ordered for a tight cap full of centipedes to accomplish the result. Even this method could not torture or kill him. The Ayyubid brutes were greatly astounded further when they saw, on removing the cap, the centipedes were dead. Salahuddin asked the nobleman to reveal the secret of this miracle. The nobleman revealed as follow[s]: When Raas al Imam al Husain was brought to Qasar, Al Moizziyat al Qahera, he had carried the casket on his head. 'O Salahuddin! This is the secret of my safety.'"

=== Recent history ===
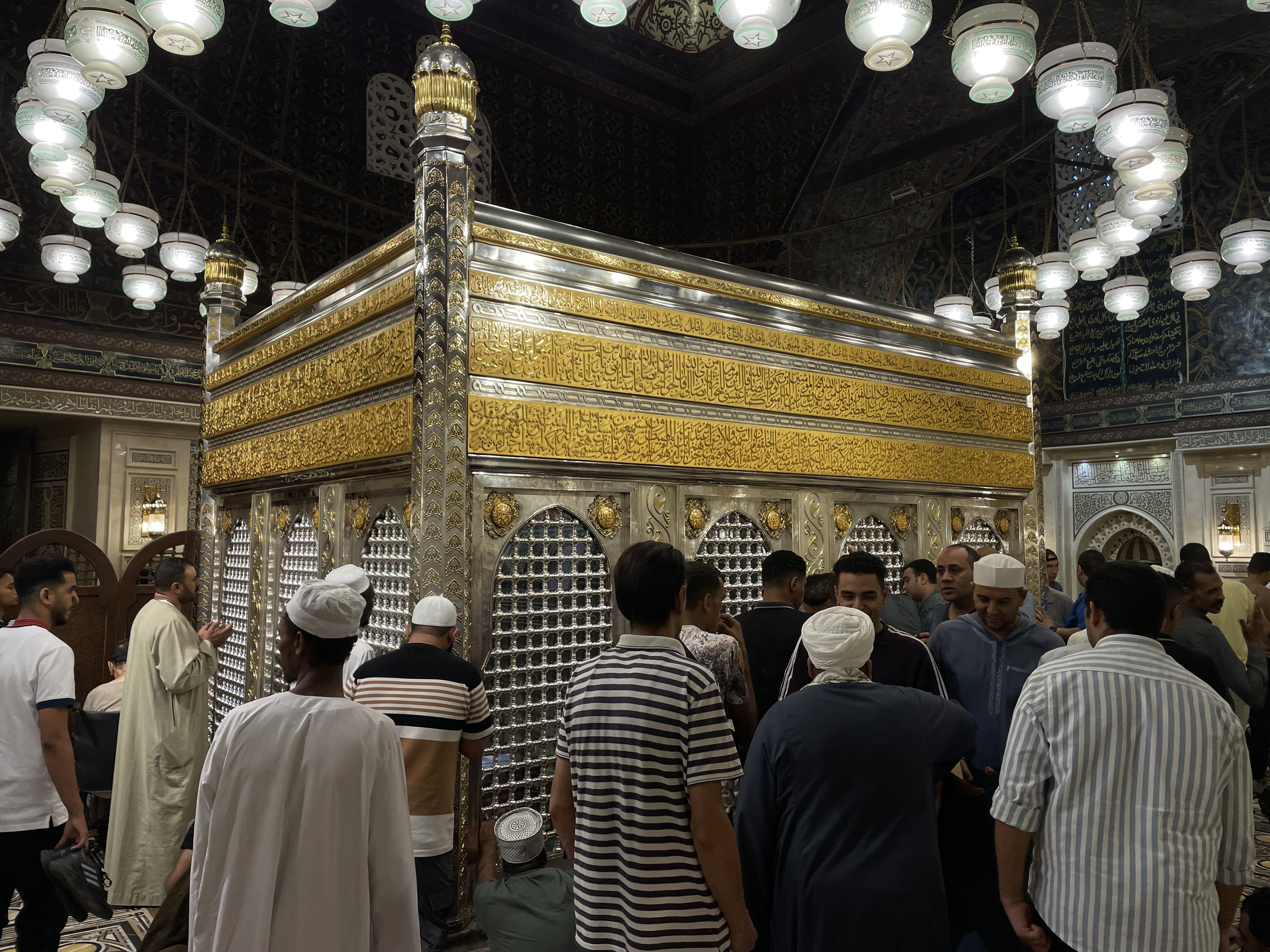
Darih of Imam Husayn in Cairo after renovations

To mark the site of burial, known as Ra's al-Husayn (Arabic: رَأس ٱلحُسَين) or Mashhad Ra's al-Husayn, Taher Saifuddin had a zarih built in Mumbai, which was later installed at the mosque in 1965 just before his death. It was subsequently inaugurated by his son, Mohammed Burhanuddin.

According to tradition: The zarih was originally meant for Al Abbas Mosque, in Karbala, Iraq, but could not be installed there. The location and the zarih had previously been measured precisely, but it simply didn't fit. Taher Saifuddin, the maker of the zarih, received divine guidance by way of intuition that out of loyalty, Al-Abbas ibn Ali—who was martyred along with his half-brother, Husayn, at the Battle of Karbala—could not allow Ra's al-Husayn be without a zarih. As a consequence, Al-Abbas' zarih was flown to Cairo and installed at Ra's al-Husayn at the Al-Hussein mosque, instead.

The mosque was severely damaged by water and was restored in 1996 by the Supreme Council of Antiquities. Major restoration was done to the tomb chamber, during which a replacement dome made of steel was placed over it. There were further extensive renovations completed in March 2022 which included a new shrine. The mosque was then inaugurated by President Abdel-Fattah El-Sisi and 53rd Da'i al-Mutlaq of Dawoodi Bohras, Mufaddal Saifuddin in April 2022.

== Architecture ==
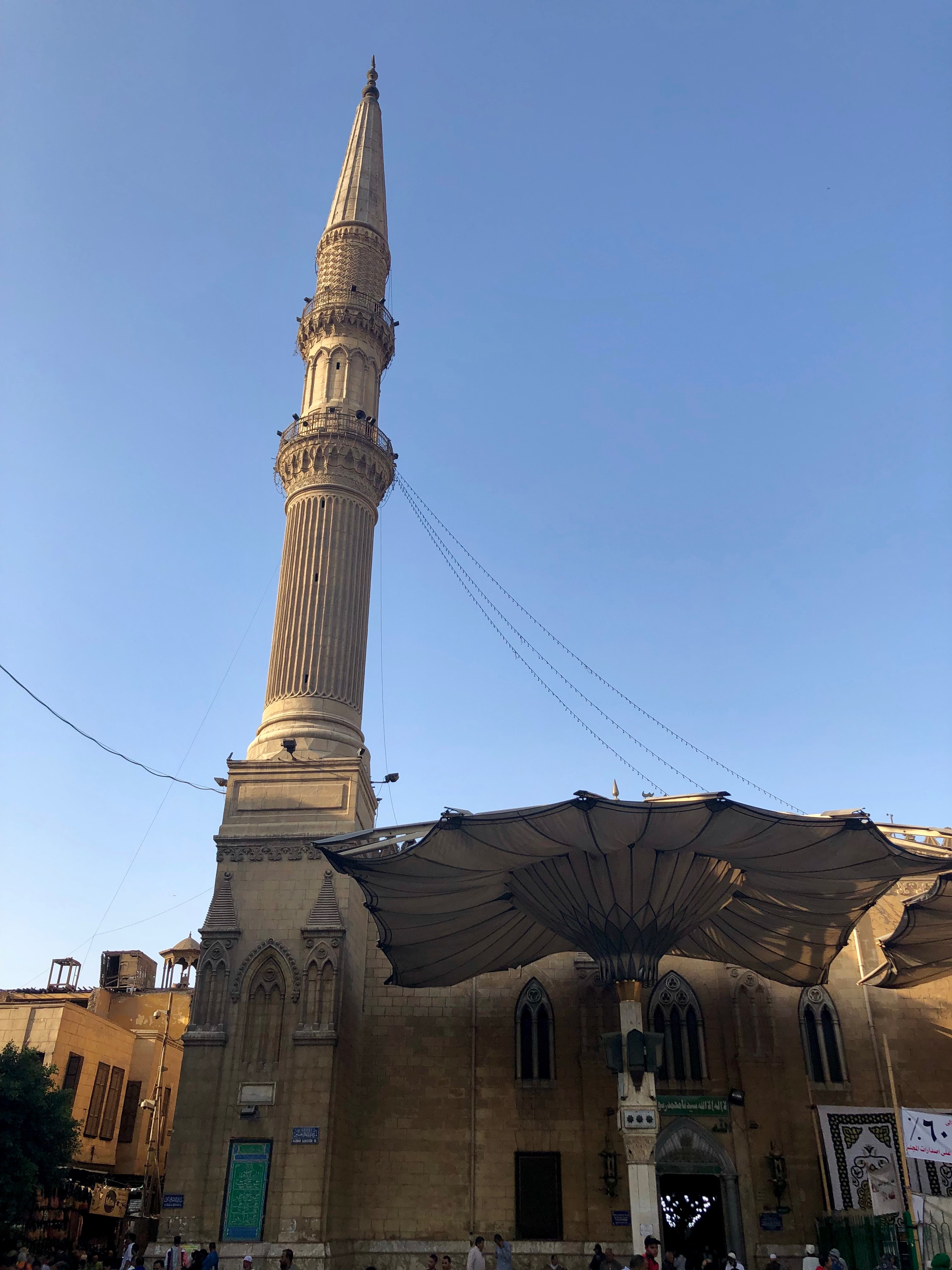
Left: One of three canopy umbrellas placed in the courtyard of the mosque. Right: Gothic-style windows and Ottoman minaret.

The building of the mausoleum was completed in 1154. Of this original Fatimid architectural structure, only the lower part of the south side gate called Bab Al-Akhdar remains original in the mosque. A couple years later, a minaret was added to the original Fatimid gateway by the Ayyubids in 1237. The minaret has panel carvings of overlapping lines that create patterns called arabesque popular in Islamic architecture. The different minarets among this mosque play a role in portraying the various powers that ruled Cairo and the way they laminated their power through architecture. Finally. in 1874, Isma'il Pasha (Khedive Isma'il) reconstructed Al-Hussein mosque inspired by the Gothic Revival architecture. Wanting to modernize Cairo, Isma'il Pasha created a mosque with Italian Gothic-style and Ottoman-style minarets. This mixture of various architectural styles famous in Islamic architecture during the khedival time period is called Islamic eclecticism.

The latest addition to Al-Hussein Mosque are three large canopy umbrellas, added to protect those praying outdoors from the sun during the summer days and from the rain during the winter. They are mechanically operated and follow the designs of those at many Saudi Arabian mosques made from steel and teflon. Many people come to the mosque to pray and visit the mausoleum. Although non-Muslims are not allowed into the building, the structure can be viewed from the outside by tourists.

== Bab al-Mukhallafat al-Nabawiyya al-Sharifa ==
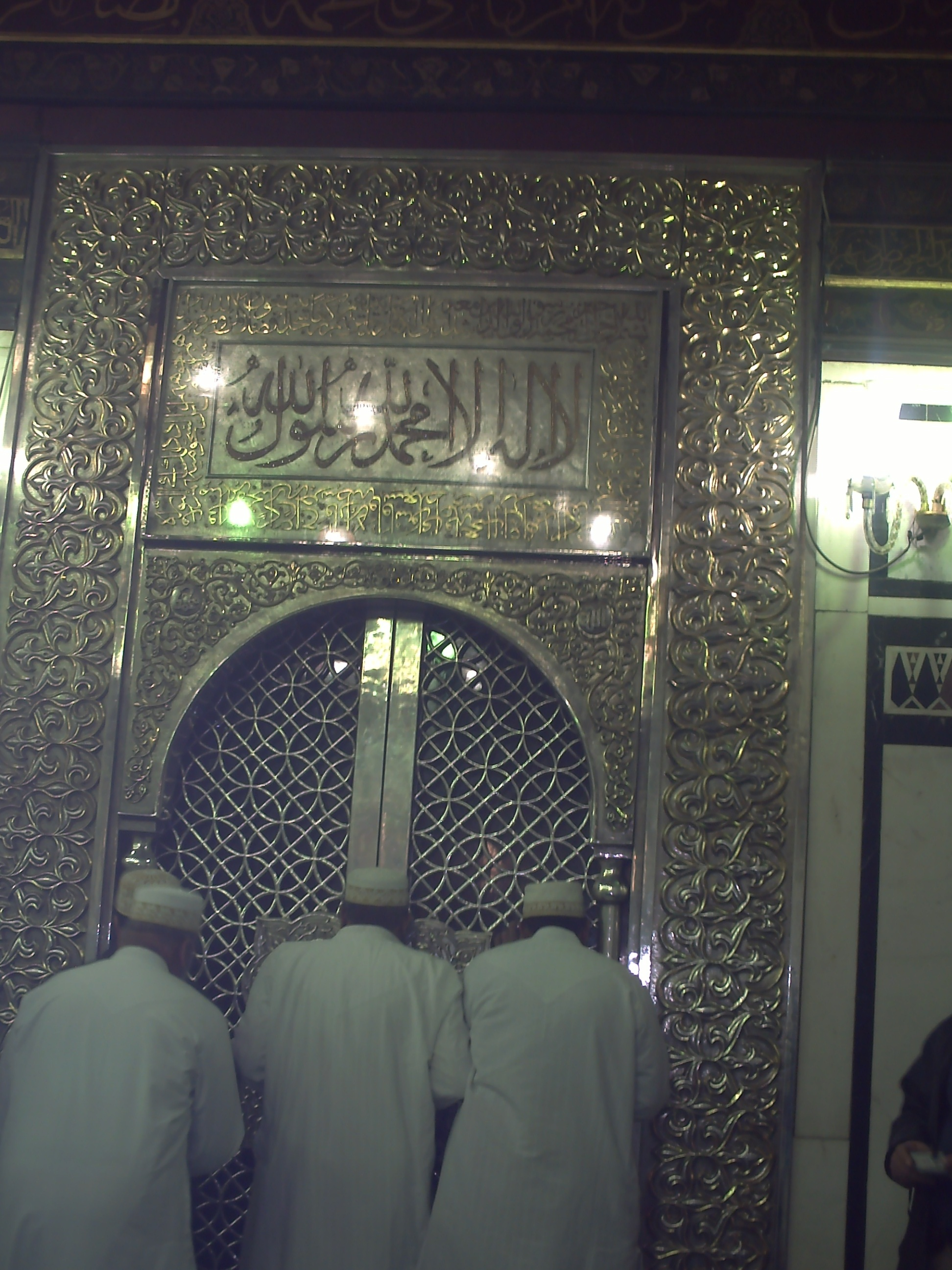
The Bab al-Mukhallafat al-Nabawiyya at the Hussein Mosque

Next to Ras al-Husayn is a crypt, housing artefacts believed to belong to Muhammad. A door laden with silver and gold was built by Mohammed Burhanuddin II and installed at the site in 1986.

The room was added to the mosque in 1893. The room contains a piece of cloth believed to be part of a linen cloak once worn by the prophet, a lantern with four strands of the prophet's hair inside it, kohl made of copper also belonging to the prophet, staff of the prophet with which he entered Mecca as a conquest and a sword that was sent to him by one of his companions. Furthermore, it includes a copy of the Quran written by Ali ibn Abi Talib written in Kufic script, containing 501 pages and written on deer skin.

== See also ==
- Islam in Egypt
- List of mosques in Cairo
- List of mosques in Egypt
- Qalawun complex
- Shrine of Husayn's Head
