= 2015 Cairo restaurant fire =

2015 fire in Agouza, Egypt

- Location: Cairo, Egypt
- Date: December 4, 2015
- Target: Employees of the club
- Attack type: Arson, Mass killing
- Weapon: Molotov cocktail
- Deaths: 17
- Injuries: 6

On December 4, 2015, a molotov cocktail was thrown into the El Sayad restaurant in Cairo, Egypt. The restaurant fire killed 17 people, and wounded six. The restaurant was also a nightclub and was located in the Agouza district of the city.

The restaurant was located in a basement and had no fire exits.

== Investigation ==
The prime perpetrators were two young men who were denied entry by the club's security personnel at the door on Thursday night. The duo with the aid of two others then came back at 6:00 a.m. on Friday to the restaurant & bar, named Al-Sayyad, with a Molotov cocktail. They picked a fight with door security and then threw the firebomb inside the club before fleeing the scene. All victims, 12 men and 5 women, were employees of the club. Investigations revealed that the emergency exit door was locked with chains, contributing to the high death toll. On 16 January 2016, Cairo prosecutors charged all four suspects with murder in relation to the arson attack.
