= 1990 Cairo bus attack =

Military attack in Egypt

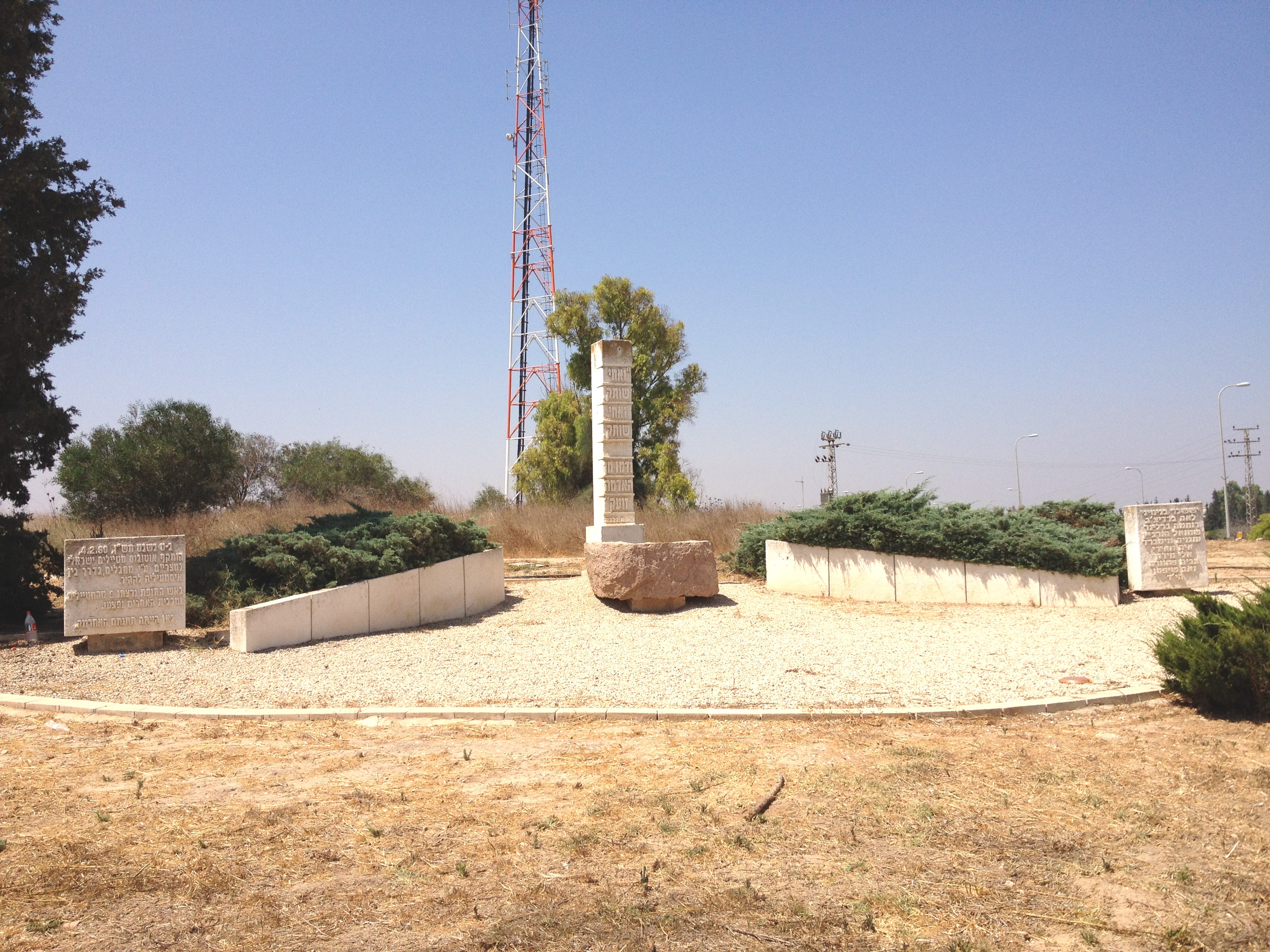
- Memorial for the attack victims
- Native name: פיגוע האוטובוס במצרים (1990)
- Location: Cairo, Egypt
- Date: February 4, 1990; 36 years ago
- Weapons: Rifles, grenades
- Deaths: 9 Israeli civilians
- Injuries: 17
- Perpetrator: Palestinian Islamic Jihad

The Cairo bus attack was an attack on a bus carrying Israeli tourists in Cairo, Egypt that occurred on February 4, 1990. The assault was claimed by two groups, an unknown group calling itself the 'Organisation for the Defense of the Oppressed of Egypts Prisons' which claimed to have done it to protest the torture in Egyptian prisons, and the Palestinian Islamic Jihad. Nine Israeli civilians were killed and 17 more were wounded with automatic fire and hand grenades. The attack was the worst on Israelis in Egypt since the two countries signed a peace agreement in 1979.

Israel's minister Ariel Sharon said the Palestine Liberation Organisation was behind the attack.

Later, the Egyptian government announced that the attack had been plotted abroad and carried out by non-Egyptians.

== The attack ==
On the day of the attack the bus had been travelling from Rafah on Egypt's border with the Israeli-occupied Gaza Strip to Cairo via the Suez Canal port city of Ismailia. On board were 31 Israeli academics and their families. As the bus neared one of Cairo's many commuter towns a white Peugeot sedan swerved in front of the vehicle, causing it to stop. Three coaches of Royal Navy personnel from HMS Bristol, HMS Ariadne and HMS Minerva were following the Israeli bus and witnessed the attack. At this point several gunmen leapt out of the car and opened fire on the bus with assault rifles forcing the following buses to reverse back up the road. The attackers also threw 4 grenades, of which 2 exploded. The attackers drove off in their car.

== Aftermath ==
The attack left 9 Israelis dead and 17 more wounded. 8 were killed outright while another died in hospital later that night. The casualties were initially taken to a hospital in the Cairo suburb of Heliopolis but were later transported by an Israeli military aircraft back to their home country.

The Israeli Prime Minister Yitzhak Shamir told Israeli television that the attack was "serious and shocking" continuing on to say "This attack proves that hatred for Israel still exists and is running wild in the area". The United States Department of State called the attack a "horrible act of terrorism and said it was an obvious attempt by the enemies of peace to halt efforts at reconciliation and dialogue."

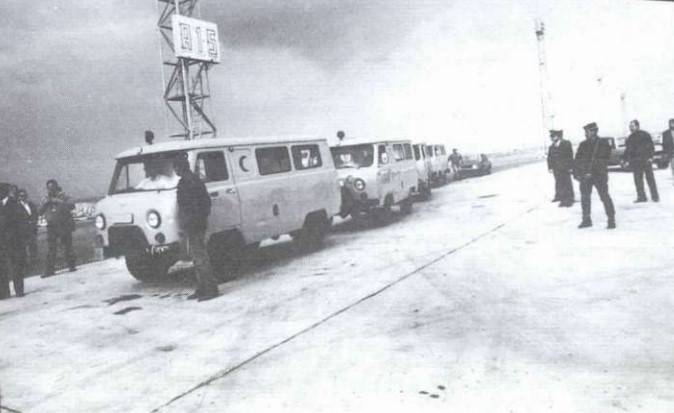
Ambulances carrying the bodies of victims

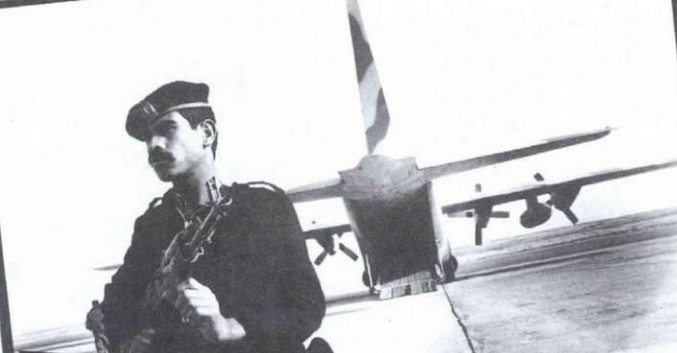
An Egyptian soldier at Cairo Airport guarding the Israeli transport plane that would fly the bodies of the victims home

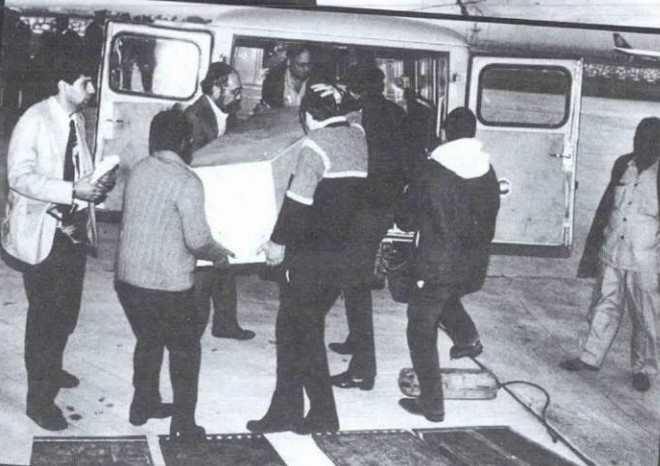
The coffin of a victim being unloaded at Cairo Airport
