= El-Fishawy Café =

Coffee shop in Cairo

El-Fishawy Cafe
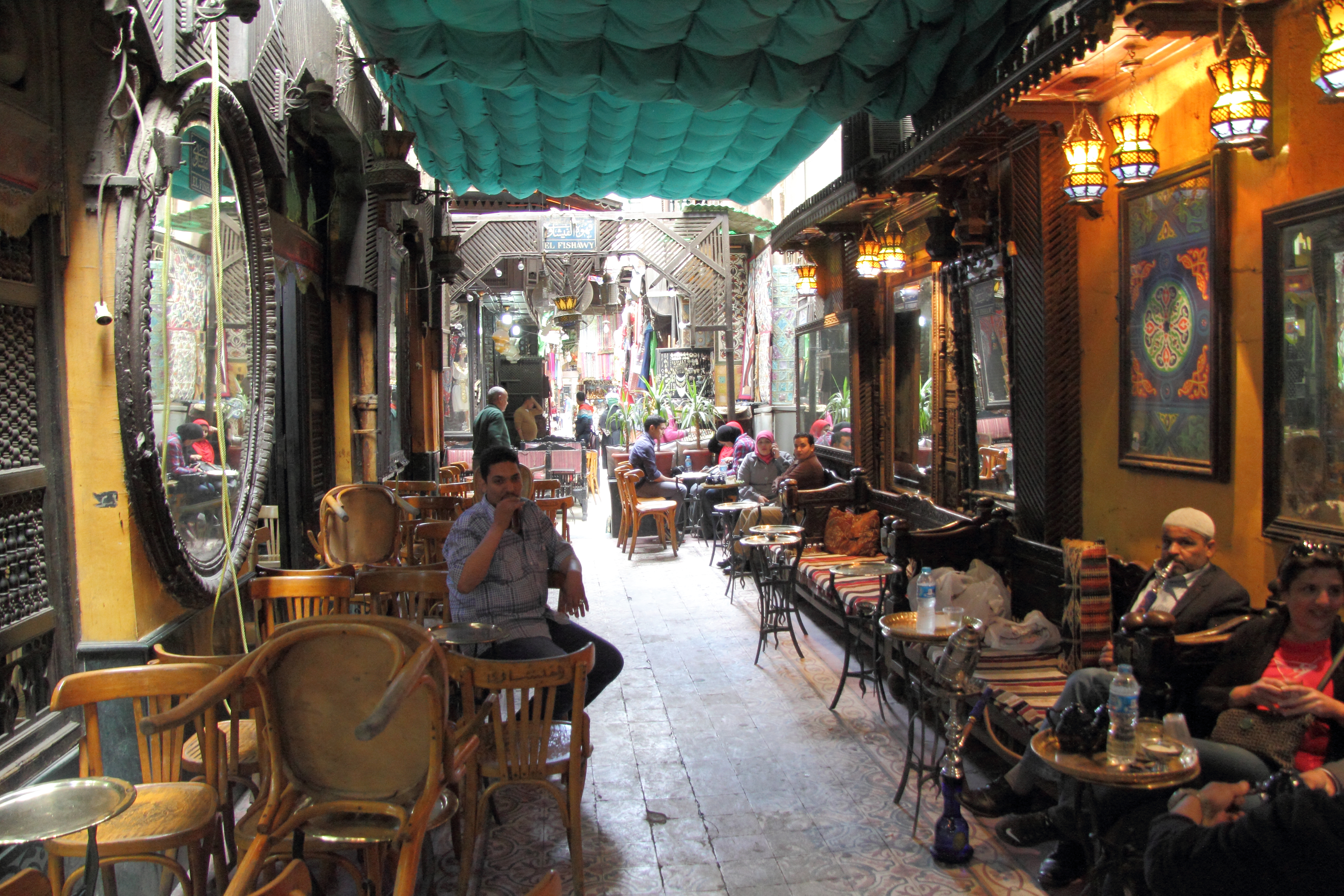
- El-Fishawy in 2016
- Interactive map of El-Fishawy Cafe

Restaurant information
- Established: 1797
- Owner: El-Fishawy family
- Location: Khan El Khalili, Cairo, Egypt
- Coordinates: 30.0475°N 31.2623°E

El-Fishawy Café (Arabic: مقهى الفيشاوي) is a cafe in Khan el-Khalili market in Cairo which opened in 1797.

The cafe, named after its first owner, has been run by successive generations of the same family over at least seven generations. During the 20th century the cafe became known for attracting writers and intellectuals, including Naguib Mahfouz and Ahmed Zewail.

The cafe is open 24 hours a day, 7 days a week. Since its founding, a number of branches of El-Fishawy have been opened across Egypt, including at Sharm El-Sheikh.

El-Fishawy has been recognised by the government of Egypt as one of the oldest cafes in the country.
