= 2005 Sharm El Sheikh bombings =

Terrorist attacks in Egypt

Coordinates: 27.8598°N 34.2824°E

- Location: Sharm El Sheikh, Egypt
- Date: 23 July 2005; 01:15 am – 01:20 am (UTC+3)
- Target: A market and hotels
- Attack type: Suicide bombings; terrorist attack
- Deaths: 88
- Injuries: ~150
- Perpetrator: Abdullah Azzam Brigades

The 2005 Sharm El Sheikh bombings were committed by Islamist group Abdullah Azzam Brigades on 23 July 2005 in the Egyptian resort city of Sharm El Sheikh, at the southern tip of the Sinai Peninsula. Eighty-eight people were killed by the three bombings, the majority of them Egyptians, and over 200 were injured, making the attack the deadliest terrorist action in the history of Egypt, until it was surpassed by the 2017 Sinai mosque attack.

The attack took place on Egypt's Revolution Day, a public holiday, and was part of a strategy of damaging tourism in the country, a major part of the economy.

After the attacks, many arrests took place, especially of the Bedouin in the Sinai, who allegedly aided the attack, and Egypt started erecting a separation barrier around the city, cutting it off from possible attacks and the nearby Bedouin community.

== Background ==
Foreign tourists have been a common target of attacks in Egypt since the early 1990s. Militants have typically been motivated by a combination of Qutbism and opposition to the Mubarak government, and attacking foreigners including non-Muslims while hurting Egypt's tourist trade was seen as serving both goals.

The most bloody attack prior to the Sharm El Sheikh attacks was the November 1997 Luxor massacre, in which 58 foreign tourists and four Egyptians were killed. The 2004 Sinai bombings killed 34 people in October in Taba, also on Sinai. In the April 2005 Cairo terrorist attacks three foreign tourists were killed.

Unlike the October 2004 Taba attacks, the Sharm El Sheikh attack does not appear to have been directed in particular against Israelis, for whom Sharm is a popular destination. However, one Israeli Arab was killed and another was injured.

== Bombings ==
The attacks took place in the early hours of the morning at the Red Sea resort, when many tourists and locals were still out at restaurants, cafés and bars. The first bombing took place at 1:15 am Egypt summer time (22:15 UTC) at the Old Market bazaar in downtown Sharm, killing 17 people, mostly Egyptians. The bomber had to abandon his truck bomb in the market because of a police roadblock. The second bomb was a truck bomb that was driven into the lobby of the Ghazala Gardens hotel, a 176-room four-star establishment in the Naama Bay area, a strip of beachfront hotels some 6 km from the town centre. About 45 people died in the blast. The final bomb was hidden in a suitcase and exploded outside the Moevenpick Hotel, killing six tourists.

The blasts were powerful enough to shake windows miles away. Fire and smoke could be seen rising from the explosion sites.

== Casualties ==
Deaths by nationality
Country	Number
Egypt	61
United Kingdom	11
Italy	6
Turkey	4
Germany	2
Czech Republic	1
United States	1
Kuwait	1
Israel	1
Total	88

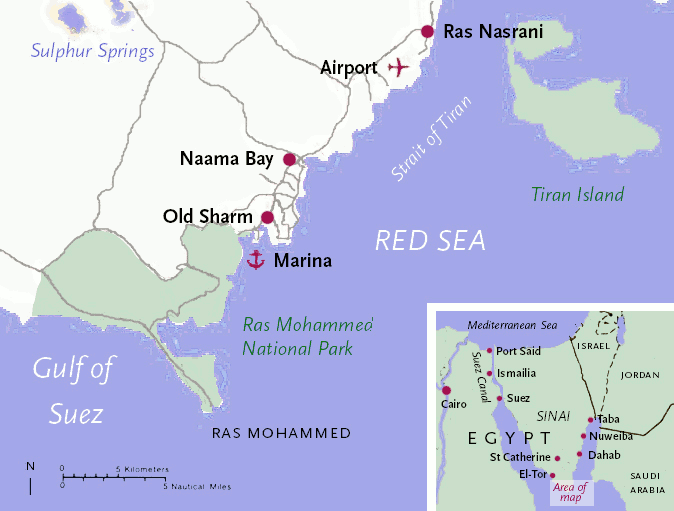
Sharm El Sheikh is located on the coast of the Red Sea, at the southern tip of the Sinai Peninsula.

The official government toll a few days after the attacks was put at 64, but hospitals reported that 88 people had been killed. The majority of dead and injured were Egyptians. Among those killed were 11 Britons, two Germans, six Italians, four Turks, one Czech, one Israeli, and one American. Other casualties, dead and injured, included visitors from France, Kuwait, the Netherlands, Qatar, Russia, and Spain. Dr. François Boureau, a medical doctor from Paris, who was a pioneering expert in providing relief to chronic pain patients, also died on 23 July 2005 in the Sharm El Sheik area, presumably in these attacks.

== Responsibility ==
A group calling itself the Abdullah Azzam Brigades was the first to claim responsibility for the attacks. On a website the group stated that "holy warriors targeted the Ghazala Gardens hotel and the Old Market in Sharm El Sheikh" and claimed it has ties to al-Qaeda.

The government said that the bombers were Bedouin militants from the same group that carried out the 2004 Sinai bombings in Taba. Arrested suspects claimed to have been motivated by the War in Iraq.

== See also ==
- 2006 Dahab bombings
- Suleiman Khater
