= 2004 Sinai bombings =

Series of vehicle bombings in Egypt

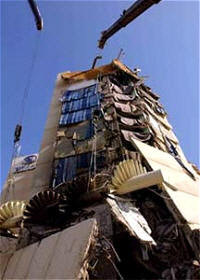
- Collapsed wing of Taba Hilton Hotel

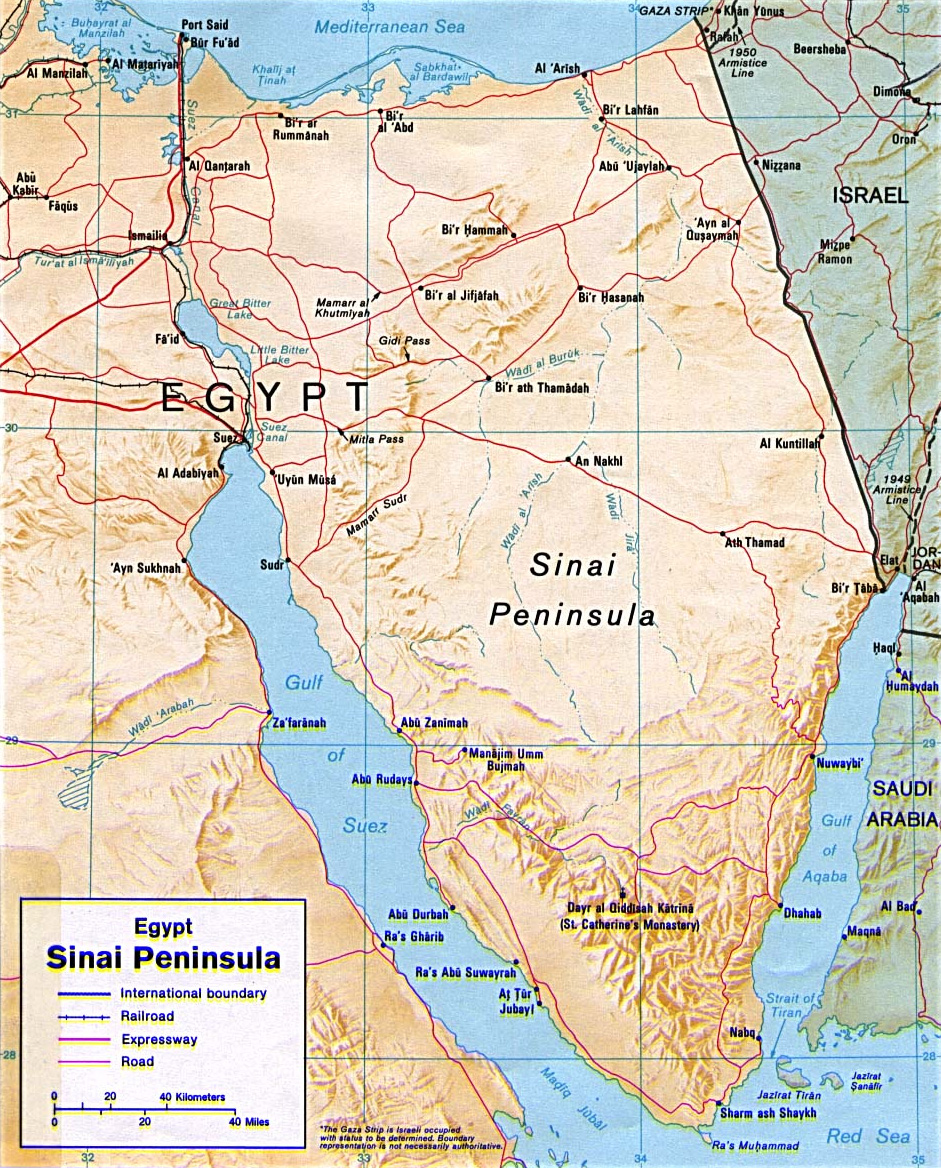
- Location: 29°07′24.43″N 34°41′05.12″E; 29°29′24.20″N 34°53′58.50″E; Taba and Nuweiba, Sinai Peninsula, Egypt
- Date: 7 October 2004
- Attack type: car bombings
- Deaths: 34
- Injuries: 171
- Perpetrators: masterminded by Iyad Saleh and carried out by a Palestinian group
- Motive: presumably the Israeli–Palestinian conflict

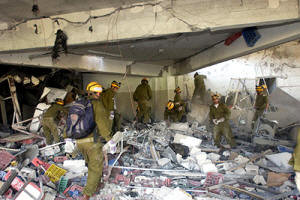
Israeli rescue team in the aftermath of the attack

The 2004 Sinai bombings were three bomb attacks targeting tourist hotels in the Sinai Peninsula, Egypt, on 7 October 2004. The attacks left 34 people dead and 171 injured.

== The bombings ==
The explosions occurred on the night of 7 October, against the Hilton Taba and campsites used by Israelis in Ras al-Shitan. In the Taba attack, a truck drove into the lobby of the Taba Hilton and exploded, killing 31 people and wounding some 159 others. Ten floors of the hotel collapsed following the blast.

Some 50 kilometers (31 mi) south, at campsites at Ras al-Shitan, near Nuweiba, two more sites were targeted. A car parked in front of a restaurant at the Moon Island resort exploded, killing two Israelis and a Bedouin. Twelve were wounded. Another blast happened moments later, targeting the Baddiyah tourist camp, but no one was hurt, apparently because the bomber had been scared off by a guard and did not enter the crowded resort.

Of the 34 who were killed, 18 were Egyptians, 12 were from Israel, two from Italy, one from Russia, and one was an Israeli-American.

== The investigation ==
According to the Egyptian government, the bombers were Palestinians who had tried to enter Israel to carry out attacks there but were unsuccessful. They claimed that the mastermind, Iyad Saleh, recruited Egyptians and Bedouins to find explosives to be used in the attacks. Beginning in March 2004, the bombers used washing machine timers, mobile phones and modified gas cylinders to build the bombs. They used TNT and old explosives found in the Sinai (as it was many times a war zone), which were purchased from Bedouins, to complete the bombs. Egypt has said that Saleh and one of his aides, Suleiman Ahmed Saleh Flayfil, died in the Hilton blast, apparently because their bomb timer had run out too fast.

Three Egyptians, Younes Mohammed Mahmoud, Osama al-Nakhlawi, and Mohammed Jaez Sabbah were sentenced to death in November 2006 for their roles in the blast. Egypt arrested up to 2,400 people following the attacks.

The initial investigations by the Israeli and Egyptian governments centered on al-Qaeda, with Israeli Foreign Minister Silvan Shalom saying "The type, the planning, the scope, the simultaneous attacks in a number of places, all this points to al-Qaeda". However, Egyptian Presidential Spokesman Majid `Abd al-Fatah later stated that there was no evidence linking the organisation to the attack, instead claiming it was the work of a lone wolf driven by "injustice, aggression and despair" over the Israeli–Palestinian conflict.

== Aftermath ==
Israel had warned in September 2004 that there were planned bombings in the Sinai, but most Israelis did not heed those warnings and went on vacation there instead. Many Israelis left the Sinai after the bombings, along with some foreign tourists, but the effects on the country's tourism were not too severe.

Terrorists struck again in Cairo at tourists in April 2005, killing three and wounding several. Similar attacks took place in resorts in Sharm El Sheikh in July 2005 and in Dahab in 2006.

On 9 May 2006, Egyptian security forces shot dead Nasser Khamis el-Mallahi, leader of the militant group. The shootout took place in Al-Arish, where el-Mallahi and Abu Jarair are native.

== See also ==
- April 2005 Cairo terrorist attacks
- 2005 Sharm El Sheikh bombings
- 2006 Dahab bombings
- Ras Burqa massacre
