= 2006 Dahab bombings =

Terrorist attacks in Dahab, Egypt

- Location: Dahab, Egypt
- Date: 24 April 2006; 20 years ago 7:15 pm (UTC+3)
- Target: Resort, Nelson Restaurant, Aladdin Café and Ghazala Market
- Attack type: terrorist bombing
- Deaths: 23
- Injuries: ≈80
- Perpetrator: Tawhid al-Jihad

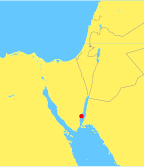
The seaside town of Dahab is located on the Gulf of Aqaba

Three bomb attacks on the Egyptian resort city of Dahab, in the Sinai Peninsula, took place on 24 April 2006. The resort town is popular with Western tourists and Egyptians alike during the holiday season.

At about 19:15 Egypt summer time on 24 April 2006 — a public holiday in celebration of Sham el Nessim (Spring festival) — a series of bombs exploded in tourist areas of Dahab, a resort located on the Gulf of Aqaba coast of the Sinai Peninsula. One blast occurred in or near the Nelson restaurant, one near the Aladdin café (both being on both sides of the bridge), and one near the Ghazala market.

These explosions followed other bombings elsewhere in the Sinai Peninsula in previous years: in Sharm el-Sheikh on 23 July 2005 and in Taba on 6 October 2004.

== Casualties ==
Deaths by nationality
Country	Number
Egypt	18
Germany	1
Lebanon	1
Russia	1
Switzerland	1
Hungary	2
Total	24

At least 24 people were killed, mostly Egyptians, but also including a German, Lebanese, Russian, Swiss, and 2 Hungarians. Around 80 people were injured, including tourists from Australia, Denmark, France, Germany, Israel, Lebanon, Palestine, South Korea, United Kingdom and the United States.

== Responsibility ==
The governor of South Sinai reported that the blasts might have been suicide attacks, but later Habib Adly, the interior minister of Egypt said that the devices were nail bombs set off by timers, and Egyptian TV also reported that the bombs were detonated remotely. Later reports suggested that the blasts may indeed have been suicide attacks, set off by Bedouins, as in earlier attacks in the Sinai. According to a report by the International Crisis Group, the Dahab bombings appear to have been targeted at the Mubarak government and stem in part from a "deep resentment" of the local people of the northern Sinai over discrimination in "jobs and housing" by governmental programs.

Egyptian security officials have attributed the attacks to an Islamic terror organisation called Jama'at al-Tawhid wal-Jihad.

== See also ==
- 2005 Sharm el-Sheikh attacks
- 2004 Sinai bombings
- List of 2006 human rights incidents in Egypt
- Luxor massacre
- Terrorism in Egypt
- List of Islamist terrorist attacks
