= List of cities and towns in the Sinai Peninsula =

City list in the Sinai Peninsula

Egypt's Sinai Peninsula is primarily divided into two governorates: North Sinai and South Sinai. This list contains cities and towns in the peninsula.

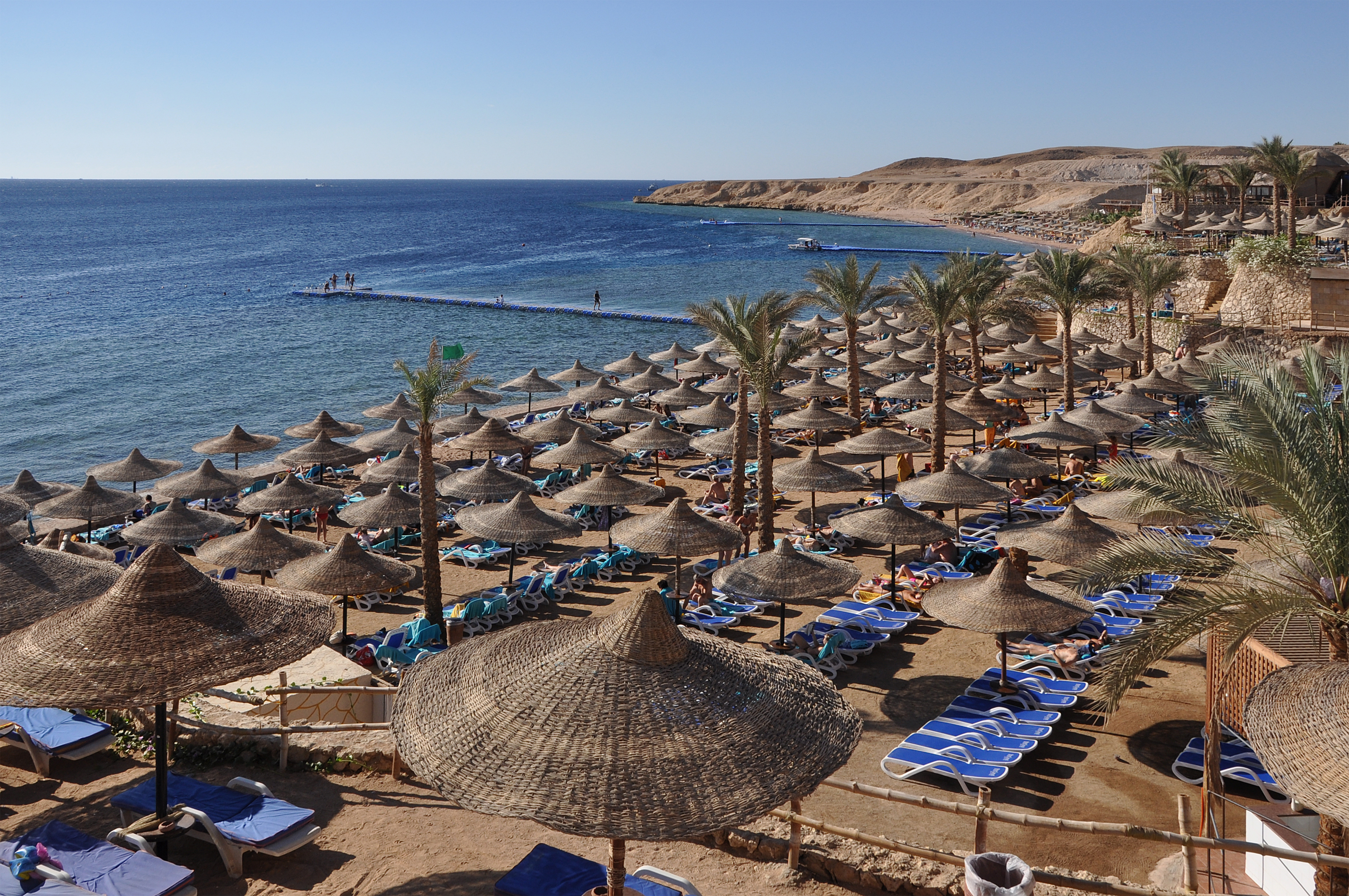
View of White Bay in Sharm-El-Sheikh, a major resort hub on the southern tip .

== North Sinai ==
- Arish: The largest city in the entire peninsula and the capital of the North Sinai Governorate. The urban divisions of Arish had a combined population of over 200,000 as of January 2023.
- Sheikh Zuweid: Located between Arish and Rafah, this town had an estimated population of 65,964 people as of January 2023.
- Bir-al-Abd: A town further west along the coast, its population was estimated at 60,827 people in January 2023.
- Rumana: A town in the northwest part of the governorate, with an estimated population of 45,292 people in January 2023.
- Nekhel: A town located in the arid interior region of the governorate, with an estimated population of 6,662 people in January 2023.
- El Hassana: Another town in the inland part of the governorate with an estimated population of 21,213 people in January 2023.

== South Sinai ==
- Ras Sedr: Located on the Gulf of Suez coast in the north of South Sinai, with an estimated population of 17,932 people in January 2023.
- Abou Redis (including Abu Zenima):: An area along the Gulf of Suez coast with a combined population of 12,535 people in January 2023.
- El Tor: The capital city of the South Sinai Governorate, with an urban population of 45,449 people in January 2023.
- Saint Catherine: A town located in the high mountainous interior. The population was estimated at 4,863 people in January 2023.
- Sharm-El-Sheikh: A major resort city on the southern tip, serving as the administrative hub for the governorate. Its permanent urban population across its two divisions was around 15,061 people in January 2023, though the total population, including temporary residents and tourists, is often higher.
- Dahab: A coastal town north of Sharm El Sheikh on the Gulf of Aqaba, with an estimated population of 3,156 people in January 2023.
- Nuweiba: A town and port further north on the Gulf of Aqaba, with an estimated population of 7,713 people in January 2023.
- Taba: A small town at the northern end of the Gulf of Aqaba, near the border with Israel, with a population estimated at 814 people in January 2023.
