= 2026 Dahab-Nuweiba bus crash =

2026 bus crash in Egypt

2026 Dahab–Nuweiba bus crash

Details
- Date: 2 September 2026; 06:45 (EEST)
- Location: Dahab–Nuweiba road, South Sinai Governorate, Egypt
- Country: Egypt
- Incident type: Bus rollover
- Cause: Under investigation; reports indicated a possible tyre blowout

Statistics
- Vehicles: 1
- Deaths: 22
- Injured: 28

On 2 September 2026, a passenger bus overturned on the Dahab–Nuweiba road in South Sinai Governorate, Egypt. Twenty-two people were killed and 28 others were injured. The bus was carrying Egyptian and Jordanian passengers and was travelling towards Nuweiba when the crash occurred.

== Incident ==
The bus was travelling from Cairo towards Nuweiba Port along the road connecting the Red Sea resort towns of Dahab and Nuweiba. The crash occurred near the Al-Saada area, where the vehicle overturned on the roadside.

Initial reports differed over the circumstances of the crash. The Egyptian Compulsory Insurance Pool reported that the driver lost control of the vehicle, while other reports indicated that a tyre may have burst before the bus overturned. Authorities had not immediately confirmed the cause of the crash.

Emergency services arrived six minutes after the accident. The Egyptian Ministry of Health and Population dispatched 20 ambulances to the scene. The injured were transported to hospitals and medical facilities in the South Sinai region. Thirteen injured people were taken to Sharm El Sheikh International Hospital, nine to Saint Catherine Hospital and six to Al-Fayrouz Medical Complex.

== Casualties ==
Twenty-two people were killed and 28 others sustained injuries in the crash. The passengers included Egyptian and Jordanian nationals. Jordanian authorities confirmed that Jordanian citizens were among those killed and injured, while Al-Mamlaka reported that 10 Jordanians were among the deceased.

== Government response ==
Following the crash, Egypt's Ministry of Health activated its central operations room and ordered medical facilities in the region to increase their preparedness. Health Minister Khaled Abdel Ghaffar directed medical personnel to provide treatment, medicines and other supplies to the injured.

Egyptian prime minister Mostafa Madbouly followed developments with the minister of health, the governor of South Sinai and other officials, and expressed condolences to the families of the victims.

Jordan's Ministry of Foreign Affairs and Expatriates activated its consular response after Jordanian nationals were reported among the casualties. A team from the Jordanian embassy in Cairo travelled to the area to follow the condition of injured Jordanians and assist with arrangements for the deceased.

== Investigation ==
The cause of the crash had not been officially determined immediately after the incident. Preliminary reports indicated that the bus overturned after the driver lost control, with some reports attributing the loss of control to a possible tyre blowout. Further investigation was expected to establish the circumstances of the crash.

== See also ==
- Sinai bus crash
