= Wadi Watir =

River in Egypt

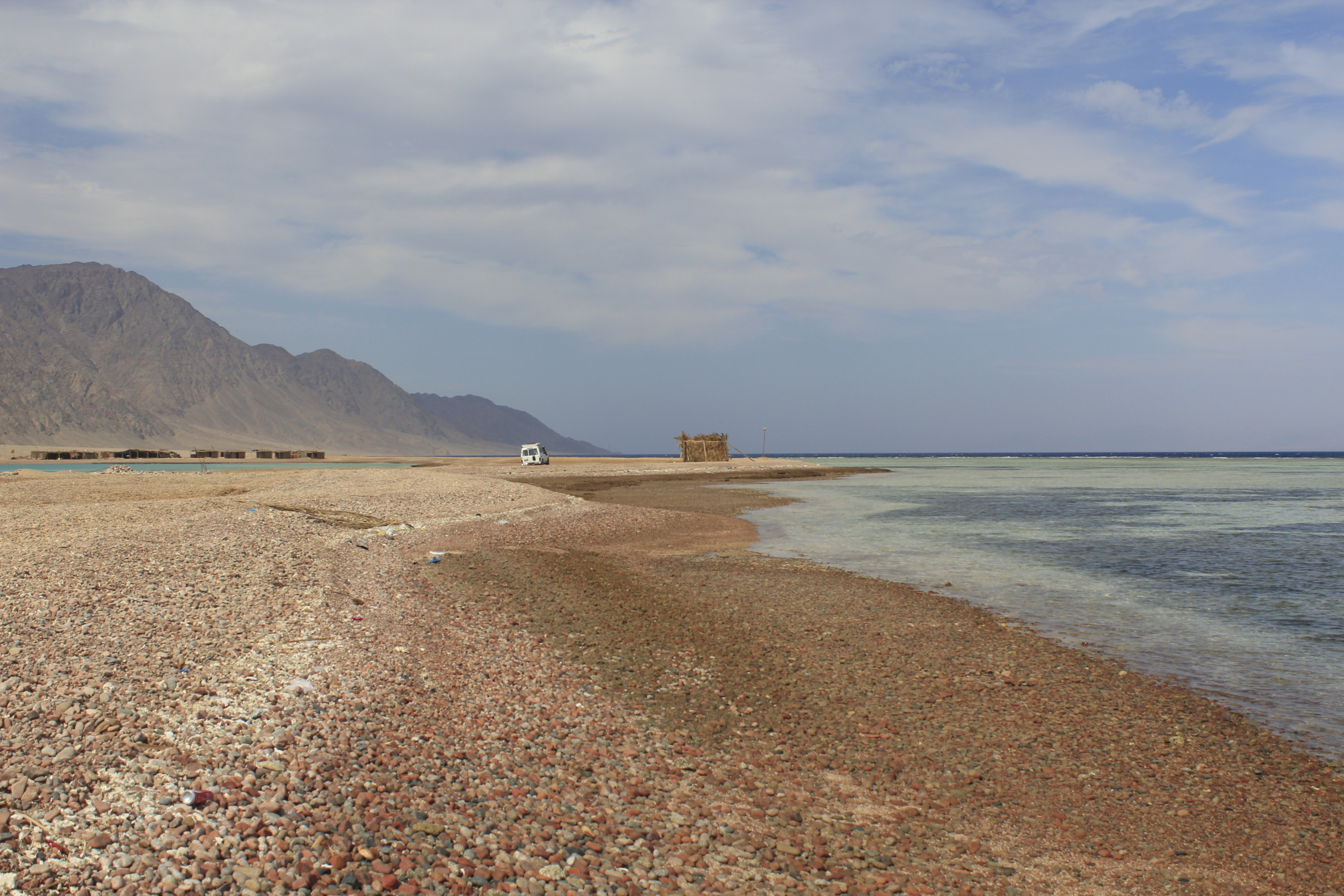
Countryside near Nuweiba

Wadi Watir is a narrow wadi and gorge in the Sinai Peninsula in Egypt.

Date palms line the wadi at places, and it empties into the Gulf of Aqaba near Nuweiba.
