= Coloured Canyon =

Canyon in Egypt

- Arabic: الوادي الملون or Arabic: اللون كانيون
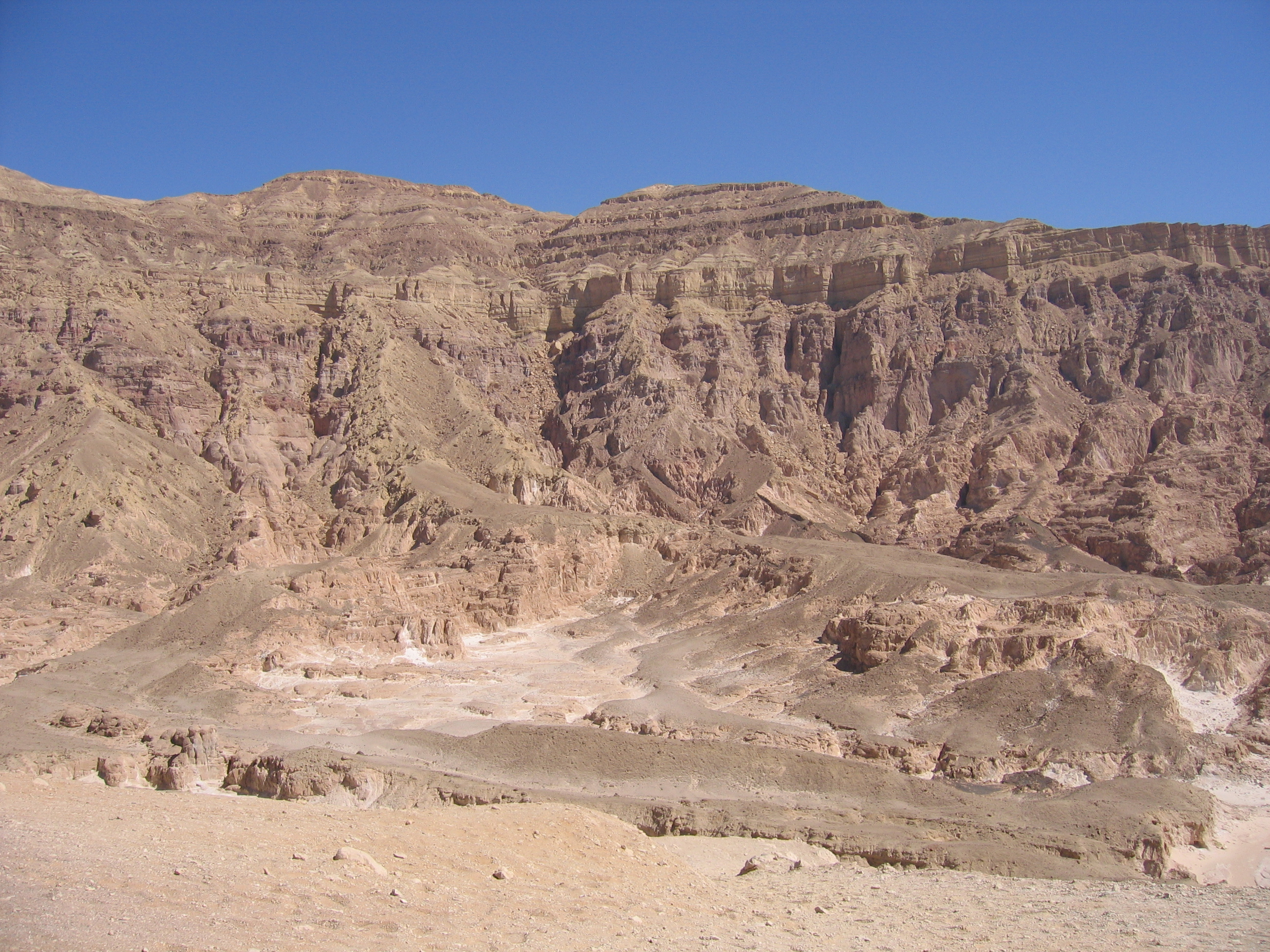

- Location within Sinai
- Length: 5 kilometres (3.1 mi)
- Depth: 30 metres (98 ft)

Geography
- Location: Egypt, South Sinai Governorate
- Coordinates: 29°08′46″N 34°35′41.50″E
- Interactive map of Coloured Canyon

The Coloured Canyon (Arabic الوادي الملون) is a rock formation on Sinai Peninsula and is a popular hiking destination. It is a labyrinth of rocks, some up to 40 meters tall. The canyon is almost 800 meters long. The nearest town to the canyon is Nuweiba. It is about 90 km north of Dahab.

== History ==
The area was once covered by the Red Sea, but as the water receded, it eroded many rock formations, including the Colored Canyon. It is also believed that Moses was once lost in the canyon for 40 years.
