= Sinai bus crash =

2006 bus incident in the Sinai Peninsula

Details
- Date: August 2006
- Country: Egypt

Statistics
- Deaths: 12

The Sinai bus crash was a bus accident in the Sinai Peninsula in August 2006 which left twelve Israeli tourists dead. The tourists, who were Israeli Arabs, were riding a chartered bus as part of a convoy of eight buses carrying Arab tourists. The bus overturned and landed upside down between Nuweiba and Taba. The survivors claimed the driver intentionally crashed the bus and the incident was a terrorist attack.

== History ==
Israel sent 40 ambulances from Magen David Adom with emergency crews to assist the casualties, but Egyptian security forces at the Taba Border Crossing held them up, while Egyptian rescue forces only arrived after an hour, with European tourists helping to rescue the wounded. The Egyptians evacuated the passengers who sustained severe injuries to hospitals in Nuweiba and Sharm el-Sheikh, while those who sustained lighter injuries were taken to the Taba border terminal and received by Magen David Adom personnel at the scene. Egyptian authorities delayed the passage of victims who wanted to cross into Israel via Taba, and made it difficult for those being treated in Egyptian hospitals to transfer to Israel for treatment. The delay in medical attention is blamed for at least one death. Those hospitalized in Egypt also alleged poor treatment in Egyptian hospitals. Israeli Air Force helicopters later airlifted some of the victims being treated in Egypt to Israeli hospitals.

In the aftermath of the attack, the Eilat Police set up an emergency command post in the city, where some of the injured were evacuated to for treatment, a team from the Israeli Embassy in Cairo visited the site, and the Israeli Interior Ministry issued a temporary order allowing all Israelis in the Sinai to return to Israel even without a passport.

The Egyptian driver was convicted of negligence by an Egyptian court and sentenced to one year in prison. Egyptian authorities were accused of deliberately handing down a lenient sentence and treating the victims' families in a deplorable way. The mayor of the local council of Kafr Manda, where three of the dead came from, said Egypt treated them badly because they were Israeli citizens.

Based on evidence amassed since the crash, the survivors maintain that the attack was premeditated. They believe that the initial plan was to kill Jews, but that the terrorist cell decided not to abort the plan even when they discovered that the passengers were Arabs.

According to one of the survivors, a newlywed whose wife was killed in the crash, "The entire ride the driver was very nervous. The driver said to us: you got Jewish education, you are the trash of the Jews and that we are traitors. When we asked him to turn on the air conditioning, he refused, saying 'soon you will all be very cold'. After the bus overturned, he walked out, stepped into a car that was waiting for him, and disappeared."

The victims submitted compensation claims to Israel’s Terror Victim Fund on the basis of these charges, but they claimed that for political convenience, the two governments classified the tragedy as an accident, a ruling disputed legally.

== See also ==
- Ras Burqa massacre
