= Ras Burqa =

Small bay in South Sinai Governorate, Egypt

Coordinates: 28.8500°N 34.1667°E

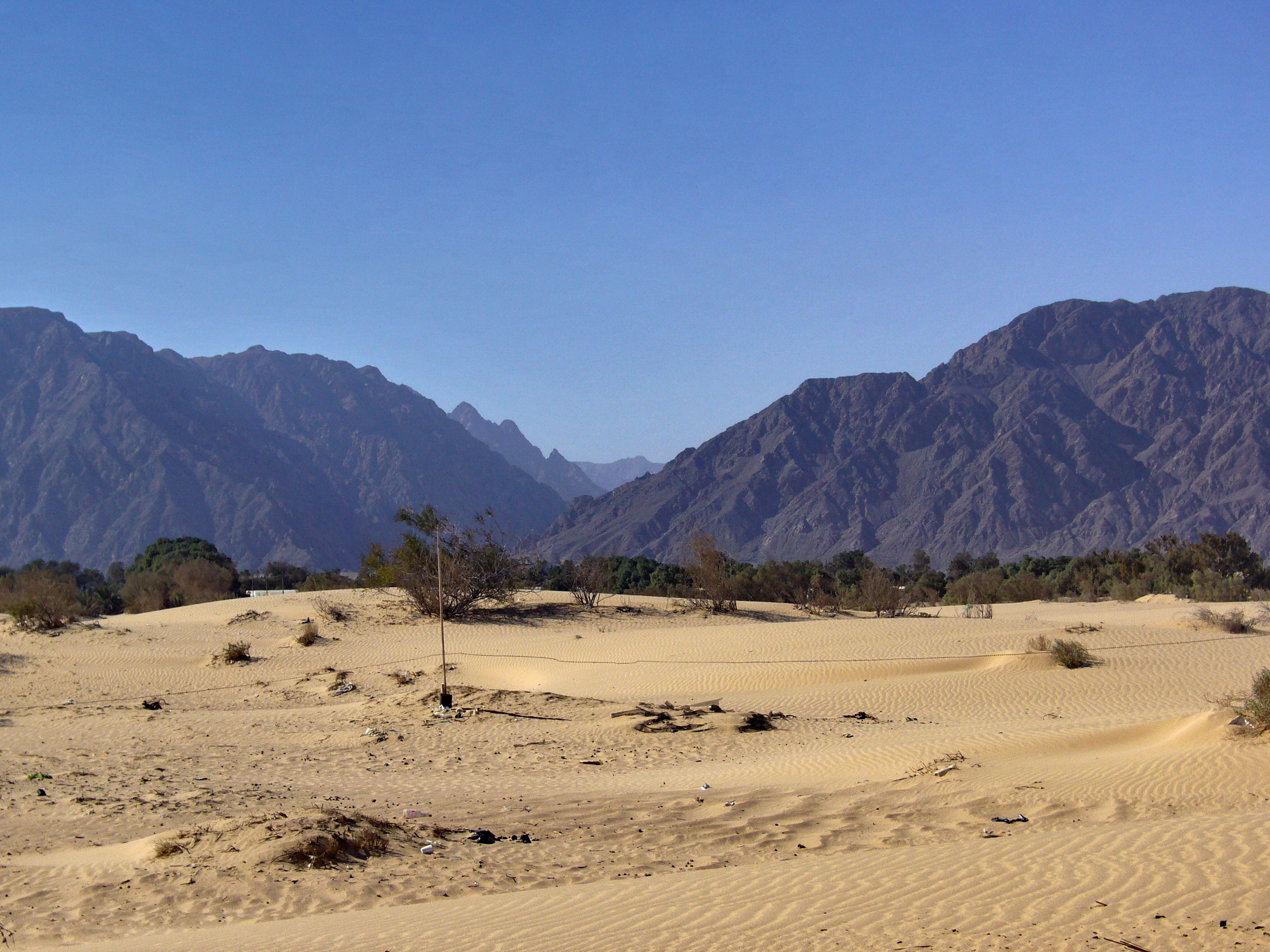
Ras Burqa, Nuwaiba

Ras Burqa, (“head of the blessing” in Arabic) is a small bay on the Red Sea in the district of Nuwaiba, Egypt.

In 1985, Suleiman Khater, a lone Egyptian gunman, perpetrated the Ras Burqa massacre, killing eight people, many targeting Israelis.

== See also ==
- List of cities and towns in Egypt
