= Suleiman Khater =

Egyptian soldier

- Born: Suleiman Mohammed Abdul-Hamid Khater; 1961; Ekyad, Egypt
- Died: January 7, 1986 (aged 24–25); Cairo, Egypt
- Cause of death: Suicide by hanging (disputed)
- Occupation: Soldier
- Status: Deceased
- Conviction: Murder (8 counts)
- Penalty: Life imprisonment with hard labor

Details
- Date: October 5, 1985
- Locations: Ras Burqa, Egypt
- Target: Israeli
- Killed: 8
- Injured: 4

Suleiman Mohammed Abdul-Hamid Khater (Arabic سليمان خاطر, also transcribed Soleiman, Sulaiman, Sulayman, Suliman, etc.; 1961 – 7 January 1986) was an Egyptian soldier who committed the Ras Burqa massacre of October 5, 1985, when he opened fire on Israeli tourists in the Sinai Peninsula, killing seven of them, as well as an Egyptian police officer. While Israel demanded that he be harshly punished, he enjoyed widespread support in Egypt and throughout the Arab world for his actions. Khater was found dead in January 1986, hanged in his jail cell, and the cause of his death was officially determined to be suicide. Many suspected that the Egyptian authorities killed him and staged a "suicide" as a convenient escape from their political dilemma.

== Early life ==
Suleiman Khater was born in 1961 in the village of Ekyad (sometimes transcribed Akyad) in Al-Sharkeyya governorate, Egypt. He was the youngest of three boys and two girls. During his childhood, Khater witnessed the Israeli strike on Bahr el-Bakar Primary School on April 8, 1970.

In adulthood, Khater joined the Egyptian Central Security Forces as part of his mandatory national service. He also began studying law at Zagazig University through a distance education program.

== Ras Burqa massacre ==
On October 5, 1985, Khater, a policeman, shot and killed seven Israeli tourists, including four children and two women, approximately 40 kilometres (25 miles) from the Egyptian-Israeli border. Khater wounded two other minors, one aged five. The shooting occurred in the late afternoon near a resort.

== Court-martial ==
Khater's lawyer requested that the trial be held in civil court, but his request was refused. He was court-martialed, found guilty, and sentenced to life in prison with hard labor on December 28, 1985. He was sent to the Military Prison in Cairo to begin serving his sentence. Khater committed suicide on January 7, 1986, less than two weeks into his life term. He was found hanged in his cell.

=== Public support ===
An Iranian postage stamp issued in Khater's honor

Khater's sentence was opposed by public pressure created by the Wafd party, the main opposition party in Egypt at that time. Its newspaper, "Al-Wafd", published a fake story, claiming that the dead tourists were Israeli soldiers who had crossed the Egyptian border and attacked Khater's post. While pro-government newspapers were silent over the incident, opposition newspapers ran articles praising Khater, hailing him as the hero of Sinai. The opposition press ran various articles attempting to justify his actions, including that the Israeli tourists were spies caught photographing secret military installations, that they spat on and tore up an Egyptian flag, that half-naked Israeli women offended the religiously observant Khater, or that the tourists attacked him. When Khater's trial opened, a wave of protest rallies took place throughout Egypt, and some 140 people were arrested, most of them at Zagazig University, where Khater had been a law student. Several thousand people reportedly attended a Cairo rally protesting his trial. Egypt's most prominent lawyers stood in line to passionately defend Khater. Afterwards, the pro-government press published the real story behind the massacre for the first time, revealing that most of the victims were in fact women and children.

The glorification of Khater in the Egyptian media was echoed in other Arab countries, where many hailed him as a hero and role model. Mass demonstrations were held in his support, and he was honored by the Parliament of Kuwait. In addition, the Iranian government of Ayatollah Khomeini issued a postage stamp reading "In honour of the martyrdom of Sulayman Khater, Hero of Sinai" and named a street in Tehran by his name.

== Investigation ==
In the investigation record, Khater tells his story that on October 5, 1985:

I was on a cliff high from the ground, serving during my shift, and I saw a group of foreigners; women, children and apparently a man wearing swimsuits. I said: 'Stop no passing' in English, they didn’t obey. And they passed by the booth. My mission there was to guard the borders, to guard the equipment that no one, Egyptian or foreigner, should see. This is a no entry area and no one should be there, and these are my orders. It isn’t the case that I let pass any girl who strips in front of me.

— Suleiman Khater, The investigation record

== Controversy ==
After several wars with massive casualties between Egypt and Israel, Khater was considered a national hero by large segments of the public in Egypt, who believed the Al-Wafd paper story about the 12 Israeli soldiers who attacked Khater and were killed. With a limited access to international media at the pre-Internet era, and under the Mubarak dictatorship, many Egyptians believed pro-Khater revisionist history and cast doubt on the government's version of his death. The Mubarak government made things significantly worse by keeping an official line of silence soon after Khater's murder spree and his arrest, which gave room for the lauding and fictional coverage of Khater's "heroism" to expand. The government only revealed that Khater murdered women and children and that the opposition press outright lied about it because they knew the pro-Khater movement hated the regime and was working to undermine or overthrow it.

Khater's family dismissed the findings that he committed suicide and accused the government of murdering him. His brother said, “I raised my brother very well, and I know how faithful and religious he is. He cannot have committed suicide. They killed him in his prison."

National journals said that Khater hanged himself from a window 3 meters from the ground.

Khater's family issued a request to have the autopsy redone by an independent committee, but their request was declined. His mother later said: “My son was killed, by the government, for the sake of America and Israel, so that they will be satisfied."

== In popular culture ==
In 2018, two years after its debut in Alexandria, an Egyptian play under the name of Khater was performed onstage in the Egyptian Shooting club and Cairo Sporting club. In response, Egypt's military prosecution decided to arrest and investigate the playwright and director of the play as well as other officials who gave permission for the theatrical show. They were charged with "insulting the Egyptian military".
