= Nuweiba Port =

Port in Egypt

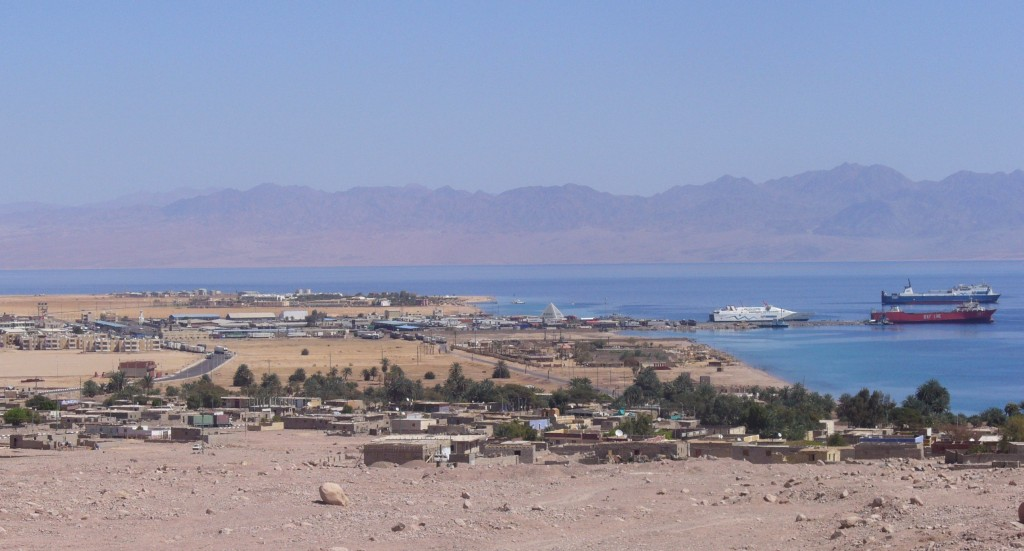
- View of the port of Nuweiba, South Sinai, 2008
- Click on the map for a fullscreen view

Location
- Country: Egypt
- Location: Nuweiba, South Sinai Governorate, Egypt
- Coordinates: 28°58′24.27″N 34°39′59.03″E

Details
- Owned by: Government of Egypt

Nuweiba Port is a seaport on the eastern portion of the Sinai Peninsula, roughly in the middle of the Gulf of Aqaba's coastline.

== Location ==
The port is located in the east of Nuweiba, a coastal town. It serves as terminal for Aqaba-bound RoRo ferries.

In 2021, the Egyptian government unveiled a plan to upgrade various Red Sea ports, and Nuweiba Port is one of them.
