= Abu Zenima =

Abu Zenima أبو زنيمة
- city
- Location in Egypt
- Coordinates: 29.045365°N 33.110733°E
- Country: Egypt
- Governorate: South Sinai

Area
  - Total: 5 km^{2} (1.9 sq mi)

Population (2025)
  - Total: 9,838
  - Density: 2,000/km^{2} (5,100/sq mi)
- Time zone: UTC+2 (EET)
  - Summer (DST): UTC+3 (EEST)

Abu Zenima (Arabic: أبو زنيمة) is a coastal city in South Sinai Governorate, Egypt. It has an area of 5 square kilometres (1.9 sq mi).

== History ==
In 2009, a whale 10 metres long and weighing 10 tonnes was found on its Red Sea beach. The minke whale was presumed to have lost its way from the Indian Ocean, and starved due to the relative lack of food. The body was buried in lime, for public health reasons, with the intention of eventually displaying the skeleton in a visitor's centre.

== Climate ==
Köppen climate classification system classifies its climate as hot desert (BWh), as the rest of Egypt.

Climate data for Abu Zenima
Month	Jan	Feb	Mar	Apr	May	Jun	Jul	Aug	Sep	Oct	Nov	Dec	Year
Mean daily maximum °C (°F)	19.8 (67.6)	21 (70)	23.7 (74.7)	27.8 (82.0)	31.6 (88.9)	33.9 (93.0)	34.7 (94.5)	34.9 (94.8)	32.2 (90.0)	29.6 (85.3)	25.8 (78.4)	21.4 (70.5)	28.0 (82.5)
Daily mean °C (°F)	14 (57)	14.9 (58.8)	17.5 (63.5)	21.2 (70.2)	24.8 (76.6)	27.5 (81.5)	28.6 (83.5)	28.8 (83.8)	26.7 (80.1)	23.8 (74.8)	19.9 (67.8)	15.7 (60.3)	22.0 (71.5)
Mean daily minimum °C (°F)	8.2 (46.8)	8.8 (47.8)	11.4 (52.5)	14.7 (58.5)	18.1 (64.6)	21.1 (70.0)	22.6 (72.7)	22.8 (73.0)	21.3 (70.3)	18.1 (64.6)	14 (57)	10 (50)	15.9 (60.7)
Average precipitation mm (inches)	1 (0.0)	2 (0.1)	1 (0.0)	1 (0.0)	0 (0)	0 (0)	0 (0)	0 (0)	0 (0)	0 (0)	1 (0.0)	3 (0.1)	9 (0.2)
Source: Climate-Data.org, altitude: 8m

== See also ==
- Abou Redis
