= Abu Rudeis Airport =

- IATA: AUE; ICAO: none

Summary
- Airport type: Public
- Serves: Abu Rudeis
- Elevation AMSL: 39 ft / 12 m
- Coordinates: 28°54′00″N 33°12′00″E

Map
- Location of the airport in Egypt

Runways
Direction	Length		Surface
Direction	m	ft	Surface
13/31	2,000	6,562	Concrete
- Source: Google Maps

Abu Rudeis Airport (IATA: AUE) is an airport serving Abu Rudeis, Egypt, a city in the Sinai Peninsula on the Gulf of Suez.

== Airlines and destinations ==
Airlines	Destinations
Petroleum Air Services	Seasonal charter: Cairo

== See also ==
- Transport in Egypt
- List of airports in Egypt
