= Ras Sedr =

Ras Sedr راس سدر
- Town
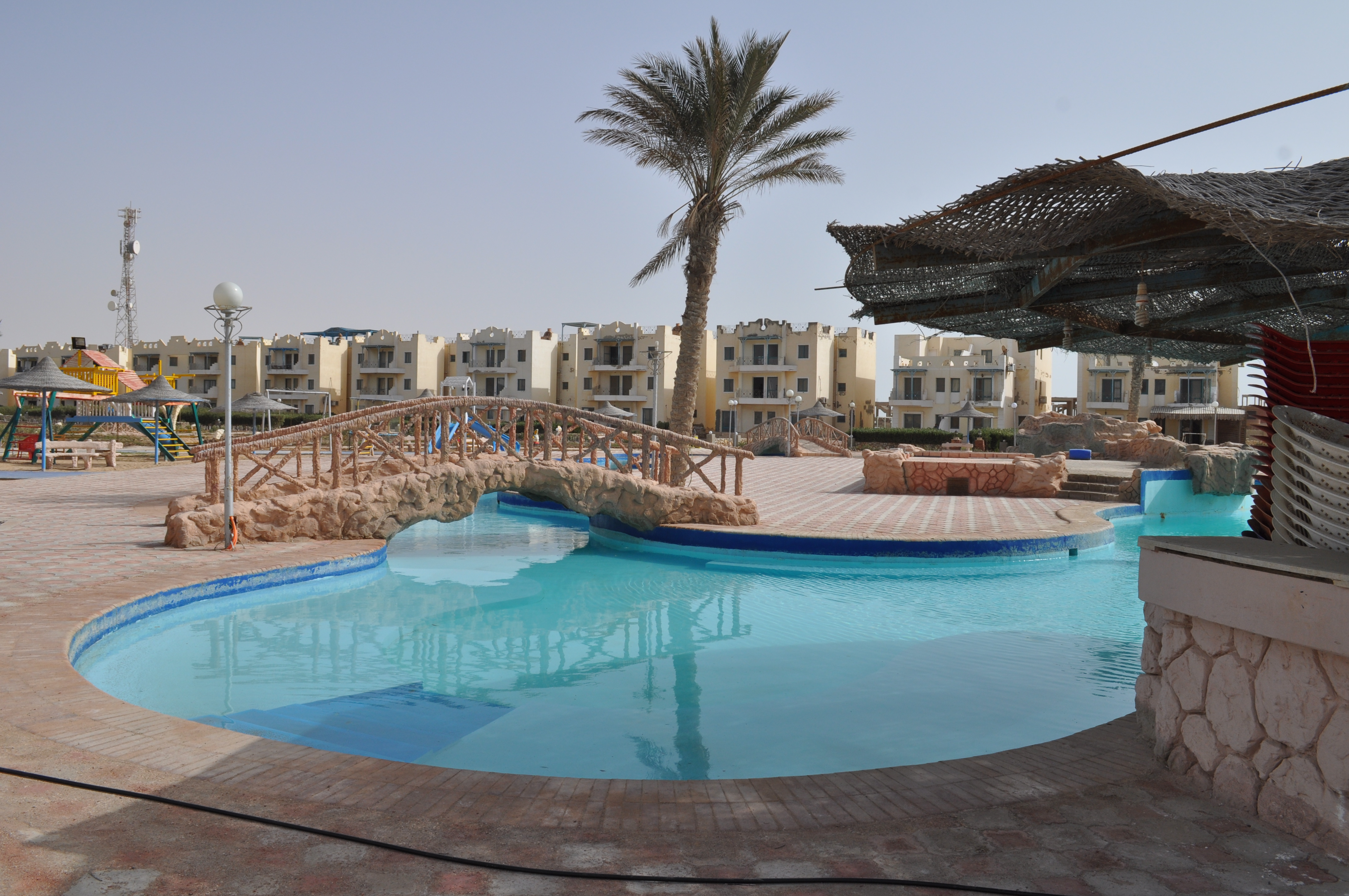
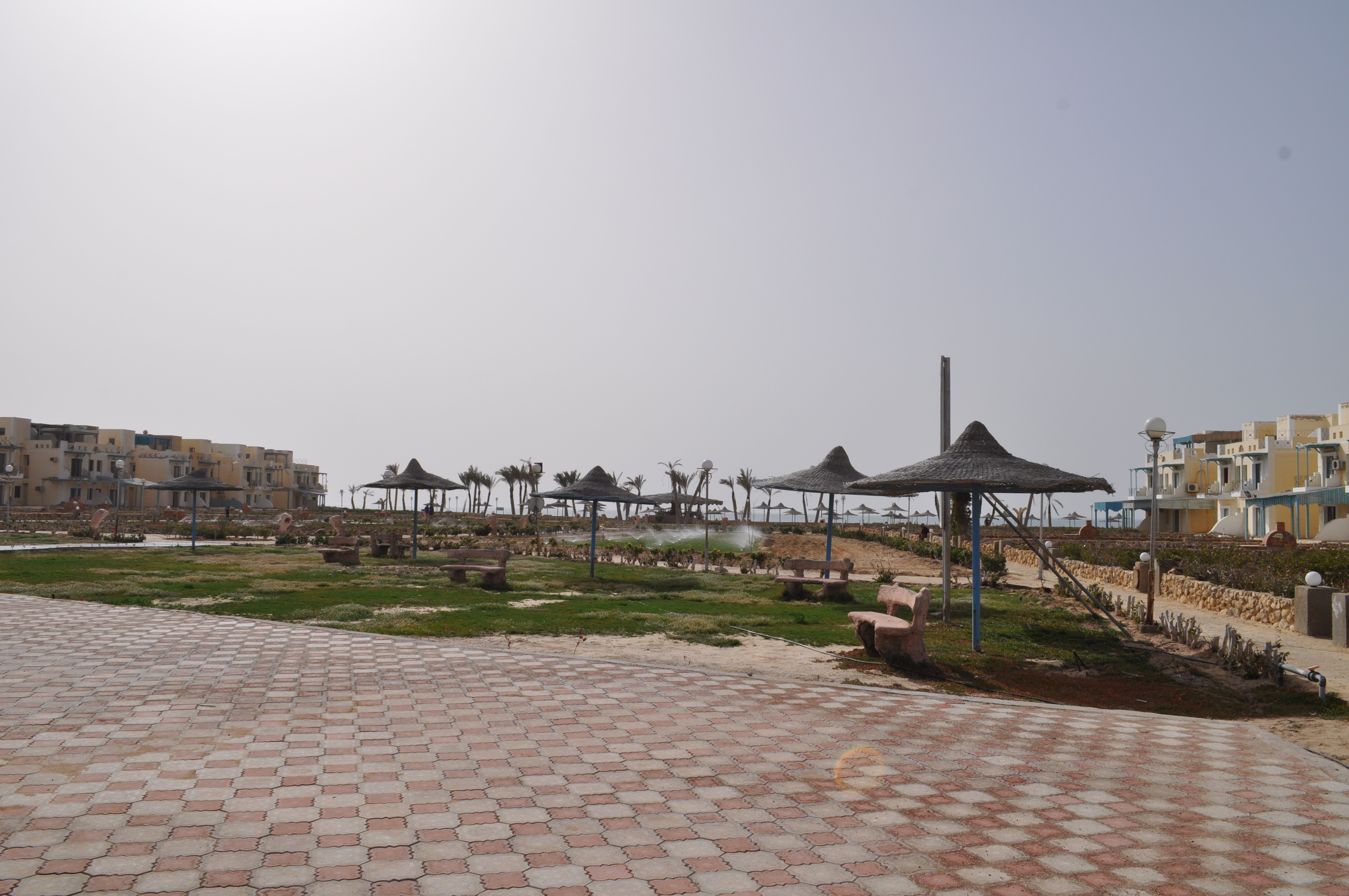

- Location in Egypt
- Coordinates: 29°35′30″N 32°42′20″E
- Country: Egypt
- Governorate: South Sinai
- Time zone: UTC+2 (EST)

Ras Sedr (Egyptian Arabic: راس سدر) is an Egyptian town located on the Gulf of Suez and the Red Sea coast. It is a part of the South Sinai Governorate, and consists of three areas: Wadi Sedr, Abu Sedr and Soerp. The region has been known since the time of the ancient Egyptians. It is increasingly visited by tourists, it consists of three regions: Wadi Sedr, Sedr, and Abu Suwayra. The town is characterized by its moderate climate throughout the year and the presence of many tourist resorts and sulfur springs that are famous for their therapeutic benefits.

== History ==
On 8 June 1967, IDF paratroopers captured the town and massacred at least 52 of the defenders after they had surrendered.

== Attractions ==
Ras Sedr has a 95 km beach coastline which offers waters for swimming and sea sports. The area also attracts bird watchers as tourists can see different species of migrating birds. Shallow water beaches and constantly blowing wind, makes Ras. Sedr one of the best kite surfing sites in the world. Recently, several kite surfing centers have opened along the cost. The artificial lakes in Holiday Inn Fantasia & La Hacienda beach resort are suitable for beginners as the wind carries the kite surfers towards the beach not away from it.

== Geography ==
Ras Sedr is 200 km from Cairo and approx 60 km from the Ahmed Hamdi Tunnel crossing in Suez, on the western side of the Sinai Peninsula, and almost opposite the resort of Ayn El Sokhna on the opposite Red Sea coastline. The main travelling road to Ras Sidr is by way of the main Suez to Sharm el Sheikh Road through almost total desert terrain. The road is dotted with farms where olives, tamarinds, and fruits are grown.

The majority of the town and outlying districts are inhabited by Sinai Bedouins who live in the areas of Wadi Abu Sedr and Soerp. Ras Sedr itself is made up of two residential areas, bisected by the main north/south road. One side contains local housing for workers, who mainly come from the north of Egypt and the Nile Valley. The other contains private villa residences for professionals and second holiday homes whose owners are mainly from Cairo. There is also a large market area with many shops and services including telephone, post office, internet services, council offices and a police station. Tradesmen of every kind can be found in the artisans' market area. There is also a small military airstrip, which is being debated whether to build a civilian airport there or the military continues to use it.

== Climate ==
Köppen-Geiger climate classification system classifies its climate as hot desert (BWh).

Climate data for Ras Sedr
Month	Jan	Feb	Mar	Apr	May	Jun	Jul	Aug	Sep	Oct	Nov	Dec	Year
Record high °C (°F)	26.0 (78.8)	30.6 (87.1)	38.7 (101.7)	44.0 (111.2)	43.2 (109.8)	42.3 (108.1)	43.3 (109.9)	42.3 (108.1)	41.0 (105.8)	37.6 (99.7)	31.5 (88.7)	27.0 (80.6)	44.0 (111.2)
Mean daily maximum °C (°F)	18.9 (66.0)	20.5 (68.9)	22.8 (73.0)	27.3 (81.1)	31.2 (88.2)	34.0 (93.2)	35.1 (95.2)	34.8 (94.6)	32.2 (90.0)	28.9 (84.0)	24.3 (75.7)	20.4 (68.7)	27.5 (81.5)
Daily mean °C (°F)	13.6 (56.5)	14.9 (58.8)	16.8 (62.2)	20.8 (69.4)	24.0 (75.2)	26.8 (80.2)	28.3 (82.9)	28.3 (82.9)	26.3 (79.3)	23.1 (73.6)	18.4 (65.1)	15.0 (59.0)	21.4 (70.5)
Mean daily minimum °C (°F)	8.1 (46.6)	9.0 (48.2)	10.6 (51.1)	14.1 (57.4)	17.2 (63.0)	19.9 (67.8)	21.7 (71.1)	22.0 (71.6)	20.0 (68.0)	17.4 (63.3)	13.0 (55.4)	9.6 (49.3)	15.2 (59.4)
Record low °C (°F)	2.8 (37.0)	0.0 (32.0)	4.6 (40.3)	6.9 (44.4)	10.8 (51.4)	14.0 (57.2)	17.6 (63.7)	18.8 (65.8)	15.4 (59.7)	11.5 (52.7)	9.3 (48.7)	3.8 (38.8)	0.0 (32.0)
Average precipitation mm (inches)	4 (0.2)	2 (0.1)	3 (0.1)	2 (0.1)	0 (0)	0 (0)	0 (0)	0 (0)	0 (0)	0 (0)	1 (0.0)	3 (0.1)	15 (0.6)
Average precipitation days (≥ 1.0 mm)	0.1	0.1	0.1	0	0	0	0	0	0	0	0	0.1	0.4
Average relative humidity (%)	60	57	57	53	51	53	54	58	60	62	61	60	57.2
Average dew point °C (°F)	6 (43)	6 (43)	8 (46)	9 (48)	12 (54)	15 (59)	18 (64)	19 (66)	18 (64)	16 (61)	12 (54)	7 (45)	12 (54)
Source 1: NOAA
Source 2: Climate-Data.org Time and Date (dewpoints, 2005-2015)

== See also ==
- Ras Muhammad National Park
- Dahab
- Taba
- Nuweiba
- Sharm el-Sheikh
