= Abou Redis =

Abou Redis أبو رديس
- city
- Location in Egypt
- Coordinates: 28.922533°N 33.193817°E
- Country: Egypt
- Governorate: South Sinai

Area
  - Total: 2,400 km^{2} (930 sq mi)
- Time zone: UTC+2 (EET)
  - Summer (DST): UTC+3 (EEST)

Abou Redis (Arabic: أبو رديس) is a city in South Sinai Governorate, Egypt. Its area is 2400 square km. It contains many Christian churches in Wadi Feran area.

== Transport ==
It is serviced by Abu Rudeis Airport

== See also ==
- Abu Zenima
