= Ras Burqa massacre =

Mass murder in Sinai, Egypt

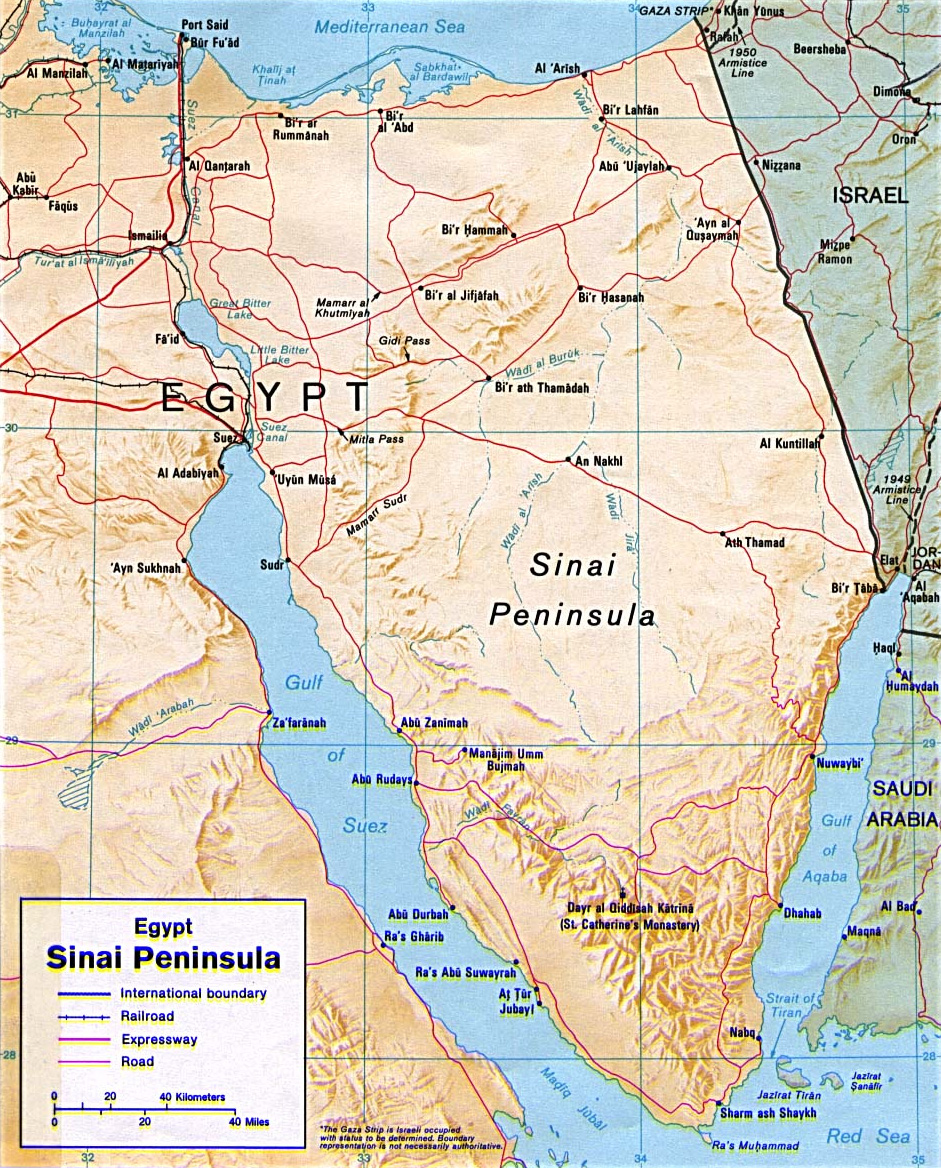
- Location: 29°12′28″N 34°44′06″E; Ras Burqa, Sinai Peninsula, Egypt
- Date: 5 October 1985
- Target: Israeli tourists
- Attack type: Mass murder
- Weapon: Machine gun
- Deaths: 7 Israeli civilians (including 4 children); 1 Egyptian policeman
- Injuries: 4 Israeli civilians
- Perpetrator: Lone Egyptian soldier (Suleiman Khater)

The Ras Burqa massacre was a mass shooting on 5 October 1985 on Israeli vacationers in Ras Burqa, a beach resort area in the Sinai peninsula, in which seven people, including four children, were killed by Egyptian soldier Suleiman Khater.

== The attack ==
On 5 October 1985, an Egyptian soldier, Suleiman Khater, machine-gunned a group of Israelis, killing three adults and four young children, on the dunes of Ras Burqa. The only survivor was 5-year-old Tali Griffel, whose mother, Anita, shielded her with her body. According to eyewitnesses, the Egyptian Central Security Forces who were nearby refused to help the wounded; furthermore, they stopped an Israeli doctor and other tourists at gunpoint from administering any aid to the victims of the shooting, and the wounded Israelis were left to bleed to death. Egyptian authorities countered that the Israelis bled to death "because this crazy soldier refused to let anyone near the area that some of the victims lay". The gunman killed one of the Egyptian policeman who tried to arrest him. Israel protested the Egyptian refusal to allow the victims to be treated by Israeli doctors or transferred to hospitals in Israel.

Khater said the killings were not intentional. He said he could only see a group of people coming towards him in the dark (despite it having been light when he shot them), refusing his orders to stop.

In an interview with Peace Now, Tali Griffel described her memories of the attack: "For many years, I didn't think about what happened. I just blocked out everything and then slowly, slowly I sort of regained feeling. I remember as the shooting started, my mother grabbed me and lay down, putting me under her. She whispered to me, keeping me calm. I can still recall the feeling of the jolt as she got shot. Yet, she continued to hold me and talk to me as she bled to death. When I crawled out, I sat there alone for a very long time. The Egyptian police came and took me away to a dark room where they interrogated me for hours."

=== Fatalities ===
Israeli civilian fatalities

Seven people were killed in the attack:

- Hamman Shelach – an Israeli judge in the Jerusalem Magistrates' Court. Was the son of Israeli poet Yonatan Ratosh, founder of the Canaanite movement.
- Ilana Shelach – Hamman's wife
- Tzlil Shelach – Hamman's daughter, 12
- Anita Griffel, 38, of Jerusalem – a Canadian-born sociologist at Hebrew University of Jerusalem
- Amir Baum, 10, of Jerusalem
- Dina Bari, 10, of Jerusalem
- Ofri Turel, 13, of Kiryat Tiv'on

== Aftermath ==
=== Trial and conviction ===
An Iranian stamp issued in memory of Suleiman Khater

After the shootings, Egyptian authorities claimed that the perpetrator Khater was mentally ill. During the initial interrogations, Khater claimed that he had been unaware of the identity or nationality of the people he had shot and that they had made no offense or provocation toward him. The only reason why he had opened fire was that, as Khater said, they had trespassed on a prohibited territory. He was tried by a closed military tribunal and on 28 December 1985 sentenced to life in prison at hard labor. Ten days later, on 8 January 1986, Khater was found dead in his prison hospital room hanging by a strip torn from a sheet of plastic. The authorities declared his death a suicide. Opposition parties in Egypt claimed that he had been murdered.

After Khater's death, the Iranian government of Ayatollah Khomeini issued a stamp "In honour of the martyrdom of Sulayman Khater, Hero of Sinai", and named a street in Tehran for him.

Khater is still praised and valorized in the anti-Israel press. Near the anniversary in October 2018 the Turkey-based Muslim Brotherhood Watan TV host Dina Zakaria called Khater a hero.

=== Reactions in Egypt ===
The policeman was praised by opposition politicians as the "hero of Sinai" following the shooting of the Israelis. The glorification of Khater as a national hero in the Egyptian opposition press was echoed in other Arab countries, and mass demonstrations were held in his support. Attempting to justify his actions, the press did not report that all but one of the victims were women or children, but instead invented miscellaneous pretexts for the shootings. The press claimed that the Israeli tourists were spies caught photographing secret military installations, that they spat upon and tore up an Egyptian flag, that half-naked Israeli women offended Khater's Muslim conscience, or that the tourists attacked him. The pro-governmental press remained silent regarding the facts of the massacre, leaving the claims unchallenged. Many Egyptian intellectuals and religious leaders joined in extolling Khater and his act. Umar al-Tilmisani, the leader of Muslim Brotherhood, said that "if every Muslim would do what Sulayman did, Israel would no longer exist". Farid Abd al-Karim, one of the leaders of the Arab Socialist Party, called Khater "the conscience of this nation", whose bullets "washed away the shame" of the Camp David Peace Accords between Israel and Egypt. Ahmad Nasir, of the Egyptian Bar association, claimed that history would always honor Khater as "a living model of a noble Egyptian who refused to be led astray by the treaties of betrayal and surrender".

The response of Egyptian president Mubarak was that "Unfortunately these things happen. They cannot reflect on the entire country." Mubarak's lack of intervention until in a late stage in attempts to present Khater as a martyred hero hampered efforts to reach an accord on Taba.

Some prominent Egyptians expressed doubt that Khater was insane. Farid Abd al-Karim wished that the whole Egypt "would be struck with this same mighty madness". Ali Hillal Dessouki, a professor at the University of Cairo, said he was astonished that such men as Khater could be accused of madness and expressed his sadness for the "so-called sane". Nour El-Sherif, a prominent actor, told Khater: "You are the sanest among us, for you did what we all want."

The beginning of Khater's trial sparked a wave of protest rallies, which the Egyptian government saw as a threat to itself. More than 140 people were arrested, mostly at Zagazig University in the Nile Delta where Khater had been enrolled as a law student. For the first time, the pro-government press published the real story behind the massacre, revealing that the victims were women and children. The editor of Al-Musawar journal criticized the opposition press for its handling of the story.

An Egyptian newspaper published in February 2014 letters written by Khater, alongside the testimonies of his friends who visited him in prison during his last days. The letters suggest that Khater was mysteriously murdered in prison, and did not commit suicide, as published at the time in Egypt. Before his death Khater told his friends that prison security officials offered to let him escape, and that he suspected that they were looking for an excuse to shoot him. Khater told his friends that there was no reason to run away, because the prison is located deep in the desert. His mother testified that upon hearing this story she felt that her son was in danger. In one of the two letters, in the possession of his friends, Khater said that he was furious at Israel's treatment of Egypt, its attacks on Lebanon, and the many activities of the Israeli Air Force in the Sinai – despite the peace agreement. In a second letter he published a list of the weapons in the hands of his army unit side by side with a description of Israel's air operations in the region, alluding to the large gap in favor of the Israeli army. A friend of Khater, who visited him two days before his death, said Khater was in a good mood, uplifted, and nothing indicated his intention to commit suicide.

=== Reactions in Israel ===
The shooting was a shock to Israeli public opinion and led to concerns about the state of relations with Egypt. Examples of memorials to the victims include: public benches in the name of Ofri Tural in Timrat where her mother lives; the Hebrew University memorial to its staff and students lists Anita Griffel, and the song "Perach" ('Flower') – lyrics by Suki Lahav, music by Yehuda Poliker and first performed by Gidi Gov.

=== Compensation to the victims ===
In 1986, as part of the Taba talks, Egypt agreed to submit a report on the murder at Ras Burka, and discuss the question of reparations to the bereaved families. In early 1989, a special Egyptian legal committee awarded compensation to the victims. The Wall Street Journal said that the amounts were "well within the norms of established international standards" and the Sun-Sentinel wrote "Egypt agreed to pay $500,000 in compensation". Egypt also made a formal statement to the family of each victim "expressing its acceptance of responsibility, its regret, and its condolences".

== See also ==
- Women in the Bible
- 1990 Cairo bus attack
- 2006 Dahab bombings
- Luxor massacre
- 2004 Sinai bombings
- 2005 Sharm el-Sheikh attacks
