= South Sinai Governorate =

Governorate of Egypt

- Governorate
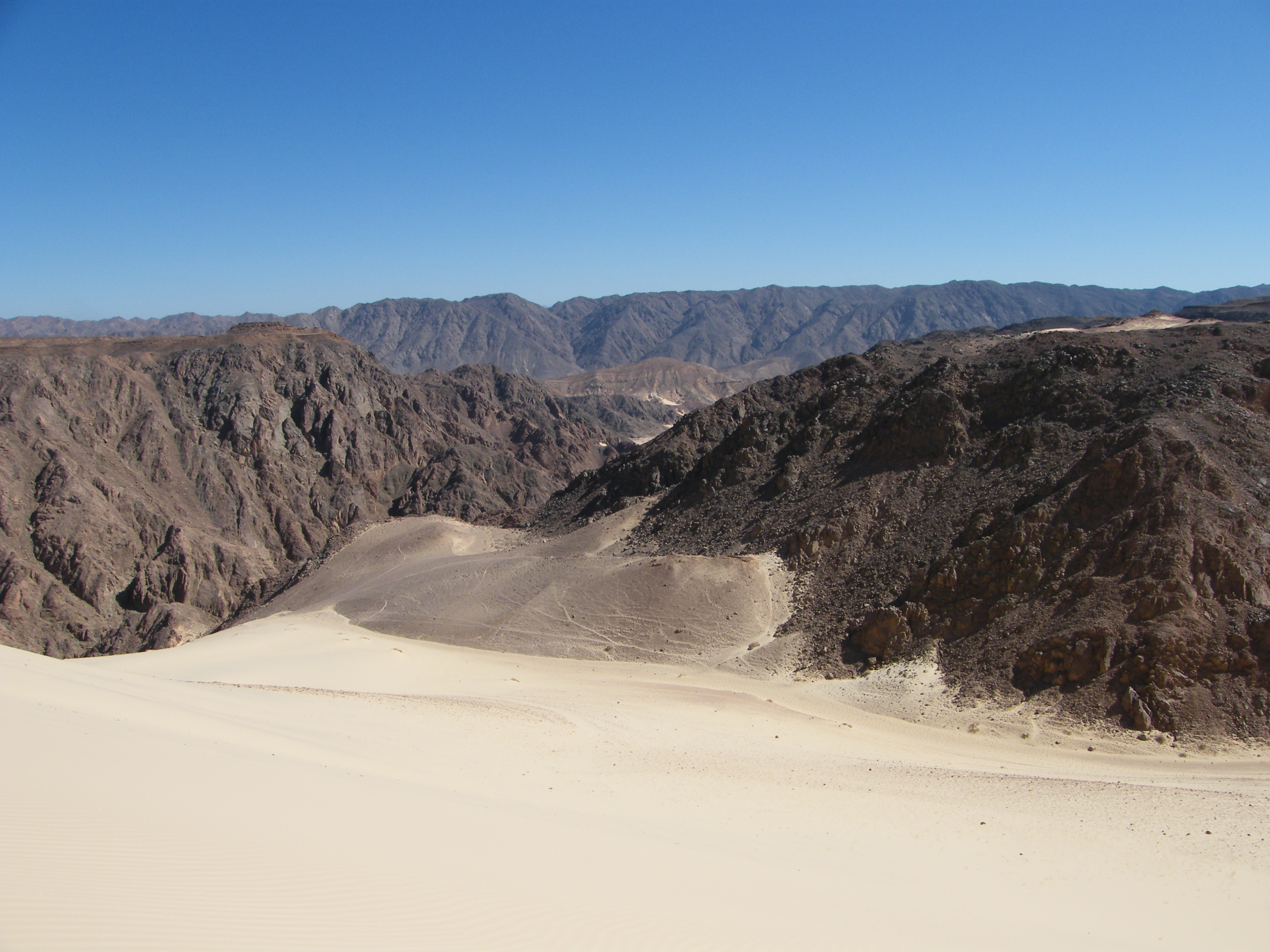
- Landscape in South Sinai governorate

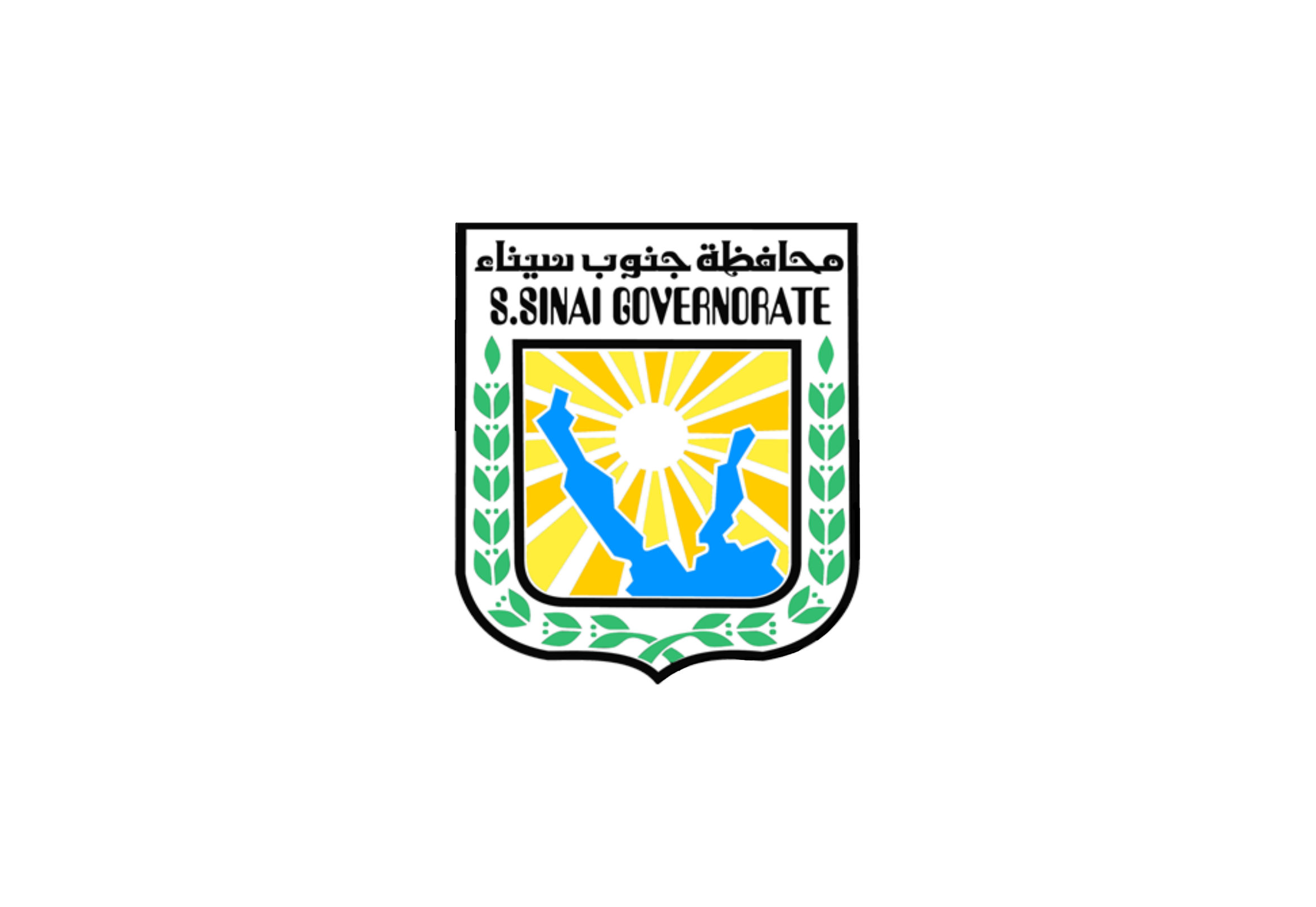
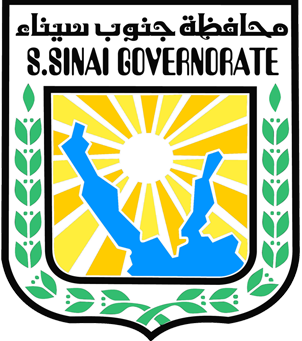
- Flag

- South Sinai Governorate on the map of Egypt
- Coordinates: 29.05°N 33.83°E
- Country: Egypt
- Seat: El Tor (capital)

Government
  - Governor: Khaled Bakri

Area
  - Total: 33,140 km^{2} (12,800 sq mi)

Population (January 2024)
  - Total: 117,113
  - Density: 3.534/km^{2} (9.153/sq mi)

GDP
  - Total: EGP 58 billion (US$ 3.7 billion)
- Time zone: UTC+2 (EGY)
  - Summer (DST): UTC+3 (EEST)
- ISO 3166 code: EG-JS
- HDI (2021): 0.738 high · 10th
- Website: www.southsinai.gov.eg

South Sinai (Arabic: محافظة جنوب سيناء Muḥāfaẓah Ganūb Sīnāʾ) is the least populated governorate of Egypt. It is located in the east of the country, encompassing the southern half of the Sinai Peninsula. Saint Catherine's Monastery, an Eastern Orthodox monastery and renowned UNESCO World Heritage Site, is located in the central part of the governorate.

== Municipal divisions ==
The governorate is divided into the following municipal divisions for administrative purposes with a total estimated population as of January 2023 of 117,113.

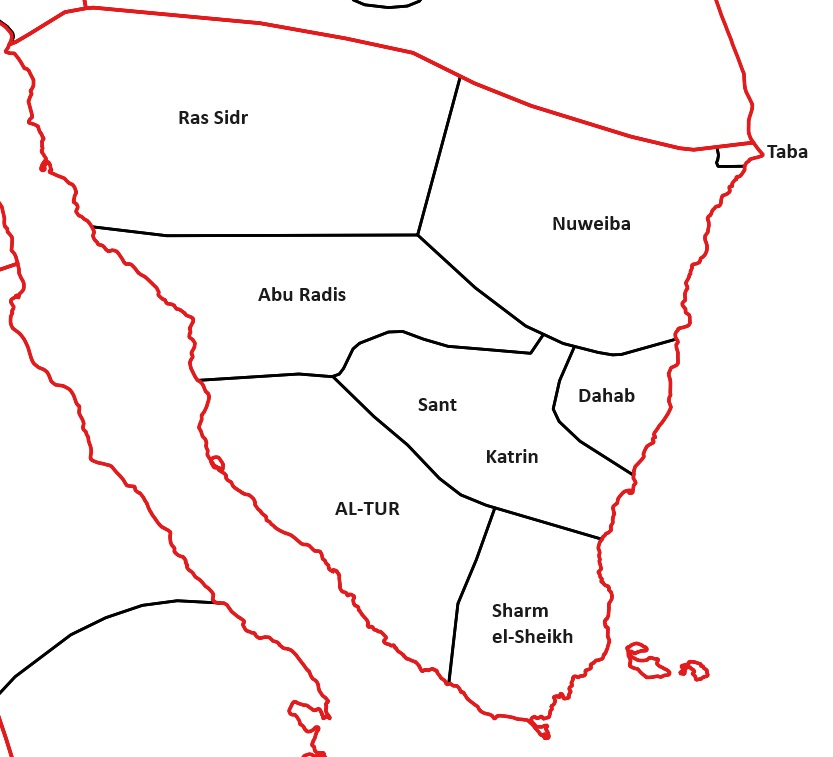
Map of the governorate and its subdivisions

Municipal Divisions
Anglicized name	Native name	Arabic transliteration	Area km²	Population (January 2023 Est.)	Type
Abu Redis (incl. Abu Zenima)	قسم أبو رديس	Abū Radīs incl. Abū Zanīmah	6,637	12,535	Kism (urban and rural parts)
Dahab	قسم دهب	Dahab	1,083	3,156	Kism (urban and rural parts)
El Tor	قسم الطور	Aṭ-Ṭūr	2,581	45,449	Kism (urban and rural parts)
Nuweiba	قسم نويبع	Nuwaybi'a	4,852	7,713	Kism (urban and rural parts)
Ras Sedr	قسم رأس سدر	Ras Sidr	6,781	17,932	Kism (urban and rural parts)
Saint Catherine	قسم سانت كاترين	Sānt Kātirīn	5,883	4,863	Kism (urban and rural parts)
Sharm El Sheikh 1	قسم أول شرم الشيخ	Sharm ash-Shaykh 1	45	13,616	Kism (fully urban)
Sharm El Sheikh 2	قسم ثان شرم الشيخ	Sharm ash-Shaykh 2	1,378	1,445	Kism (urban and rural parts)
Taba	قسم طابا	Ṭābā	96	814	Kism (fully rural)
South Sinai Governorate	جنوب سيناء	Muḥāfaẓah Ganūb Sīnāʾv	31.272	115.611	8 Kism

== Tourism ==
The governorate is an attractive destination for tourism due to its amazing and fascinating nature scenes; however, it has been the site of several terrorist attacks. In 1985, a mass murder occurred in the Ras Burqa resort and killed 8 people (7 Israeli tourists and 1 Egyptian policeman). The 2004 Sinai bombings that targeted tourist hotels in and around Nuweiba killed 34 people and wounded over 170. In 2005, Sharm El Sheikh was hit by a terrorist attack. 88 people were killed, the majority of them Egyptians, and over 200 were wounded, at that time making it the deadliest terrorist action in the country's history (exceeding the Luxor massacre of 1997, which killed 62 people). 2006 saw the Dahab bombings, which killed 23 people and wounded 80.

The Sinai insurgency, although happening mainly in the neighboring North Sinai Governorate, occasionally spilled over to South Sinai. In February 2014, a tourist bus was attacked in Taba. The perpetrators killed the Egyptian bus driver and three South Korean tourists.

After 2014, The Egyptian government and the Egyptian army took firm actions to eliminate terrorism, and city is now safe.

== Demographics ==
According to population estimates, in 2024 the majority of residents in the governorate lived in urban areas, with an urbanization rate of 51.1%. Out of an estimated 117,113 people residing in the governorate, 59,845 people lived in urban areas as opposed to only 57,268 in rural areas. The Bedouin inhabit the Mount Sinai area. Due to poor accessibility, at times the orchards in the mountains have served to hide narcotics smugglers in the region.

== Landmarks ==
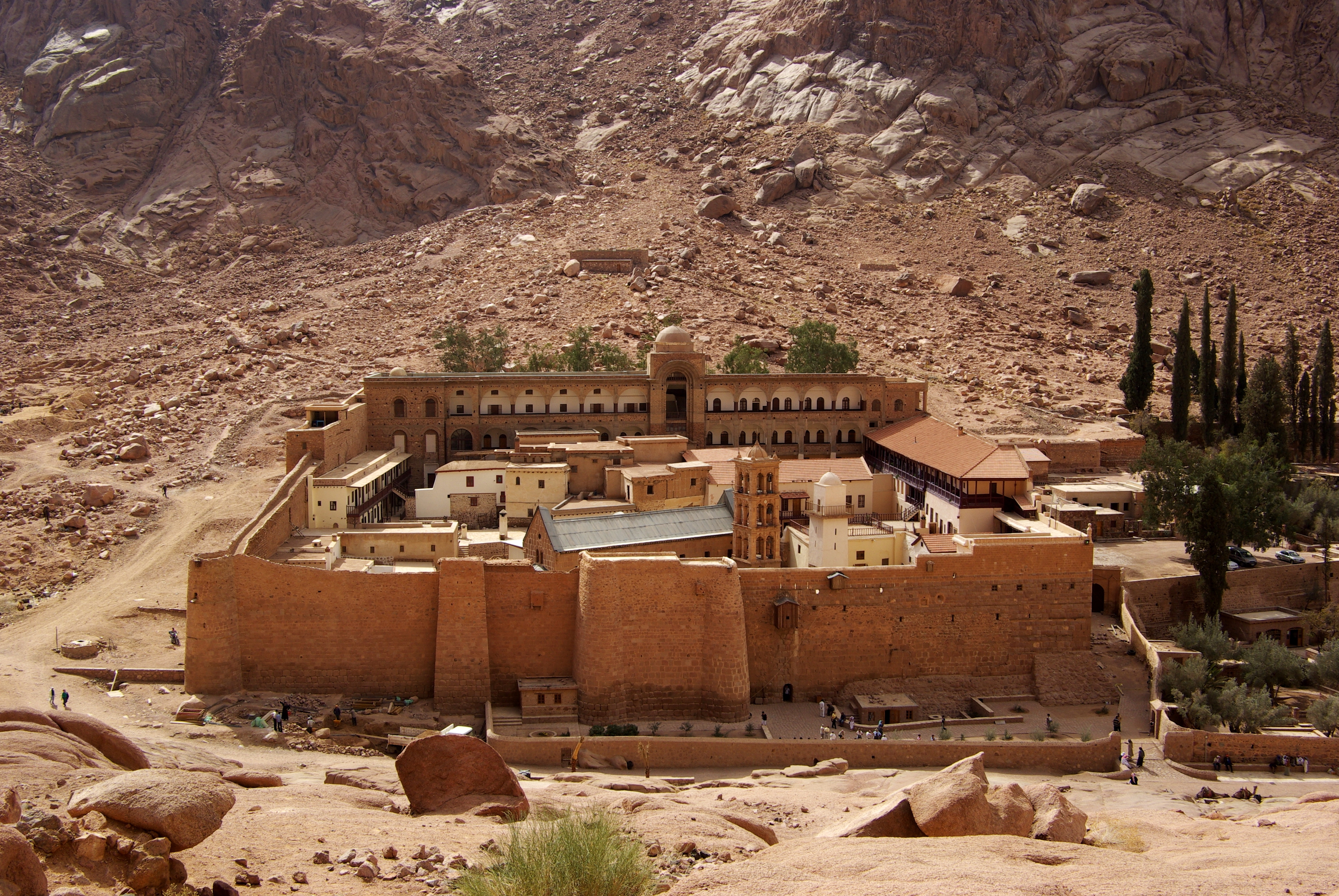
Saint Catherine's Monastery

Saint Catherine's Monastery, an Eastern Orthodox Church monastery and UNESCO World Heritage Site of world renown, is located in central part of the governorate, at the mouth of a gorge at the foot of Mount Sinai, in the city of Saint Catherine, Egypt. Built between 548 and 565, the monastery is one of the oldest working Christian monasteries in the world. The site contains the world's oldest continually operating library, possessing many unique books including the Syriac Sinaiticus and, until 1859, the Codex Sinaiticus.

Raithu Monastery is situated in El Tor. It was built on a site where some 40 monks were massacred in the 4th or 5th century.

== Cities and towns ==
- Abu Redis
- Abu Zenima
- Dahab
- El Tor
- Nuweiba
- Ras Sedr
- Saint Catherine
- Sharm El Sheikh
- Taba

== Sites ==
- Wadi Mukattab
- Wadi Feiran
