= Nuweiba =

Nuweiba نويبع
- coastal town
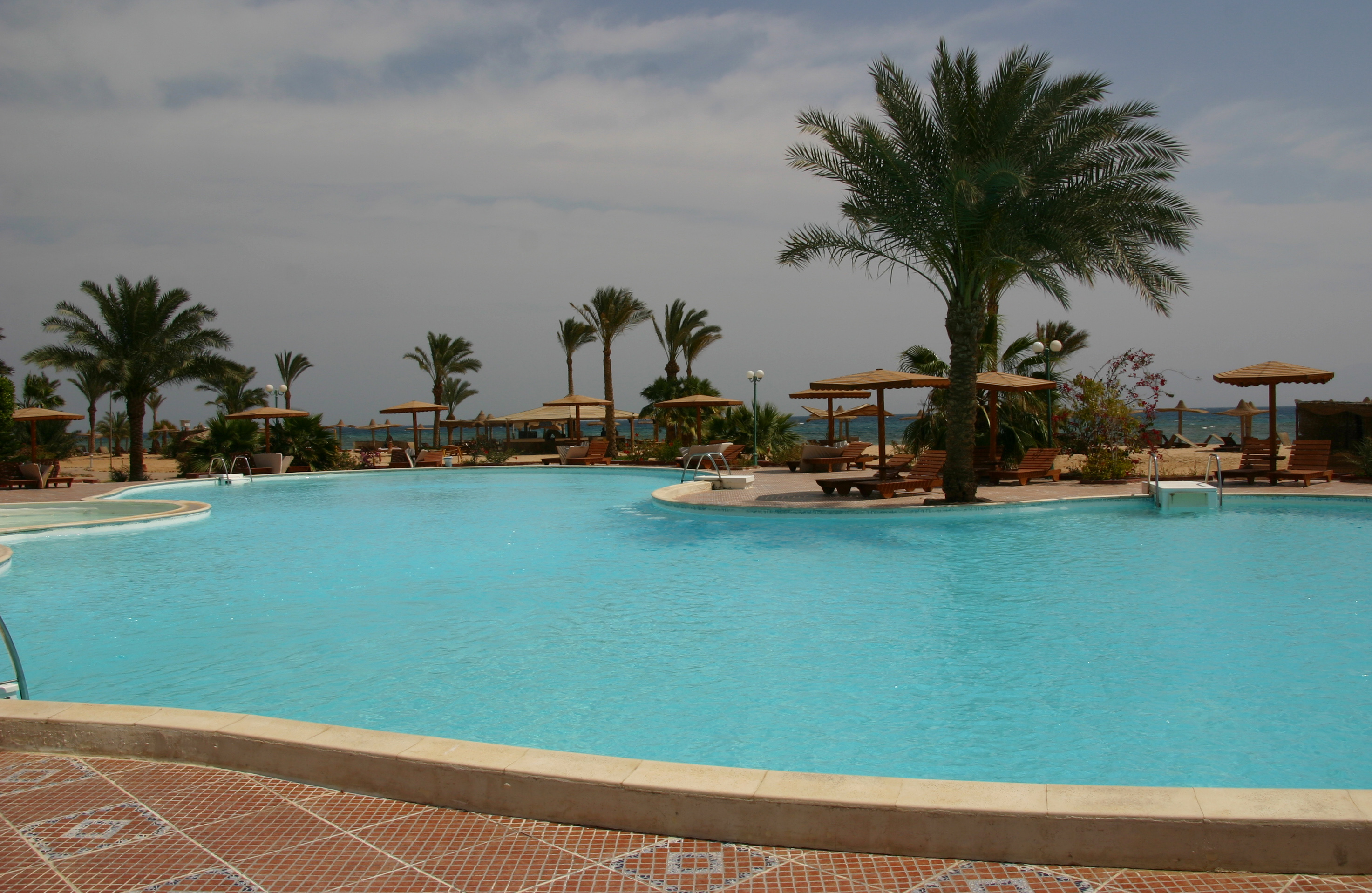
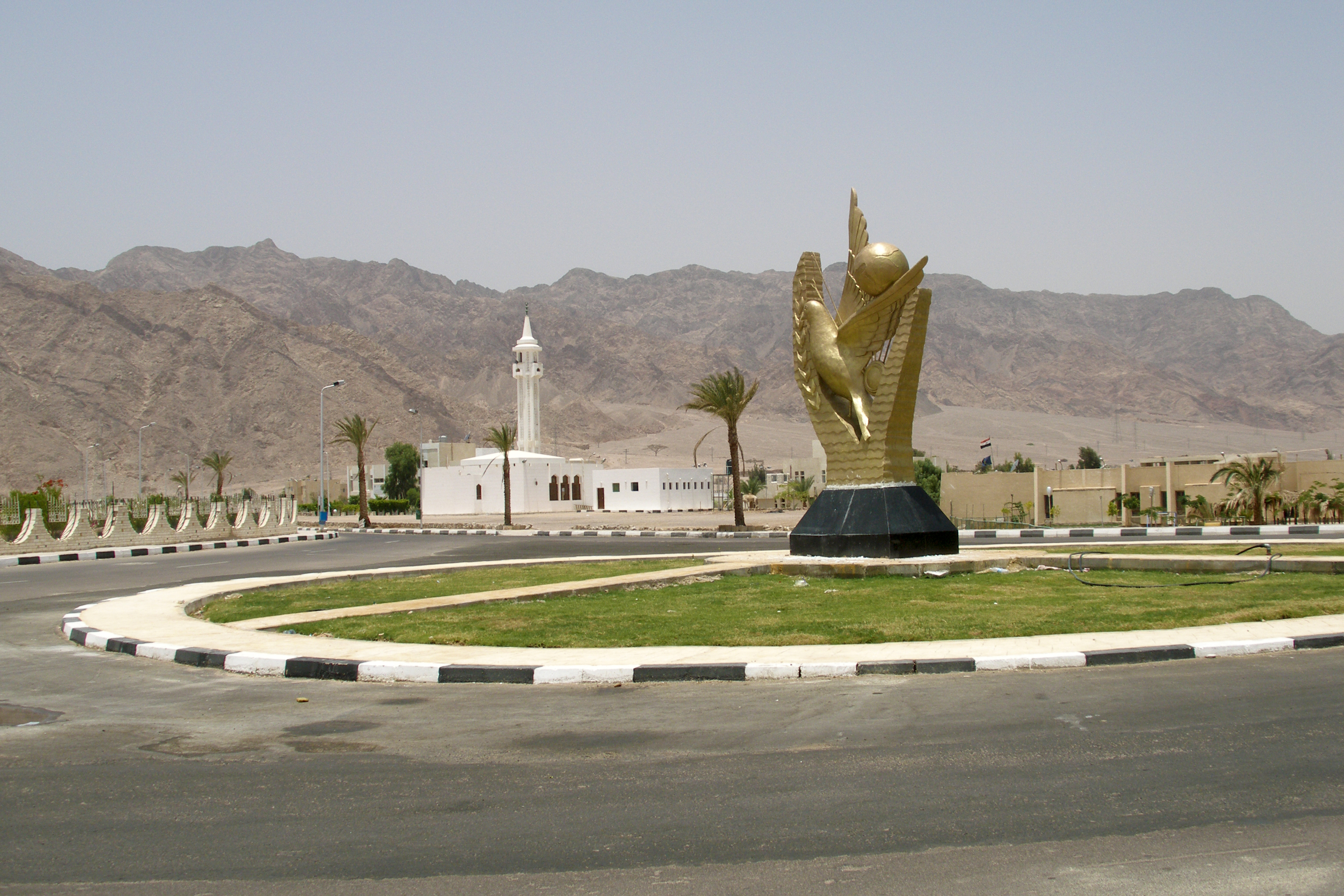
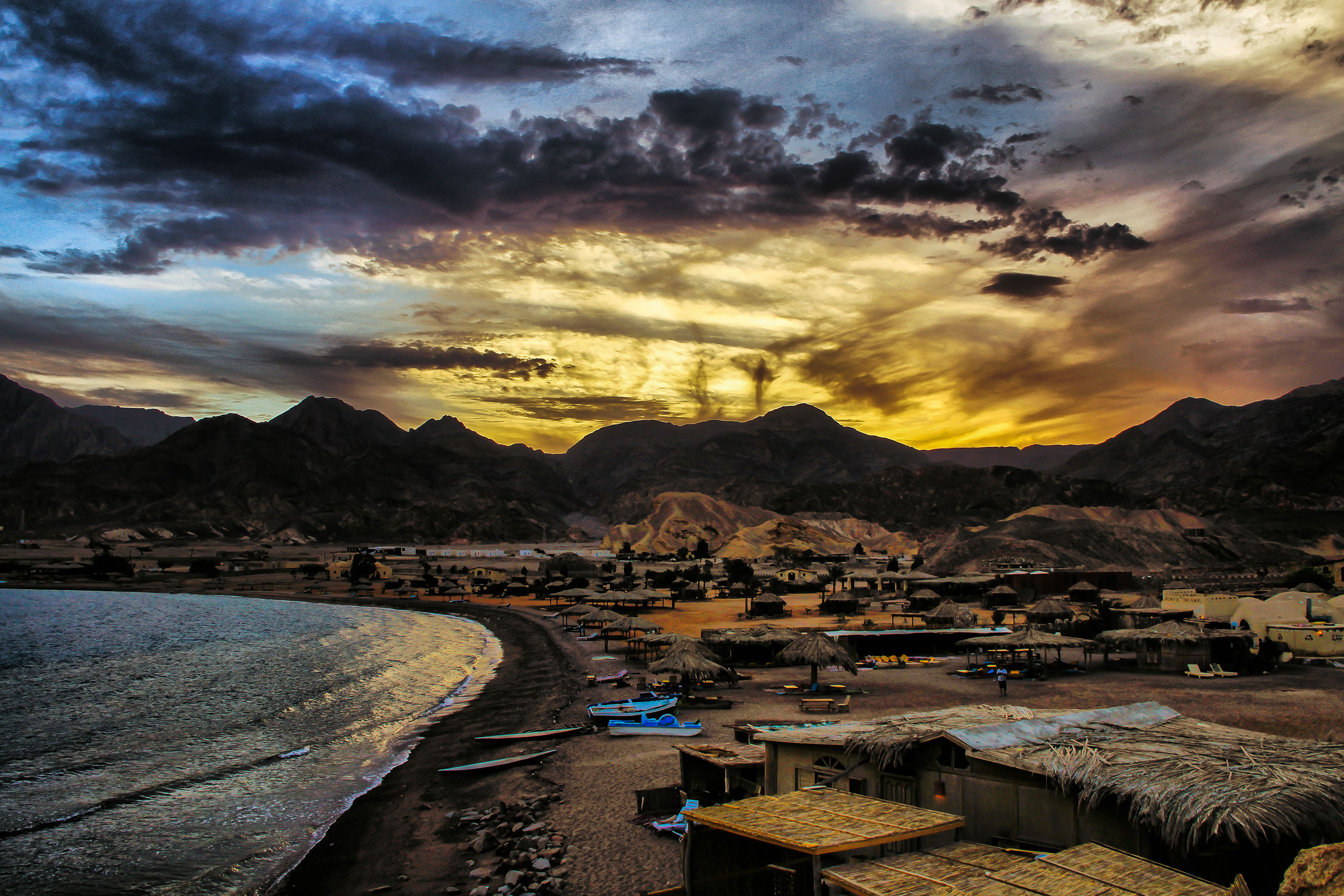
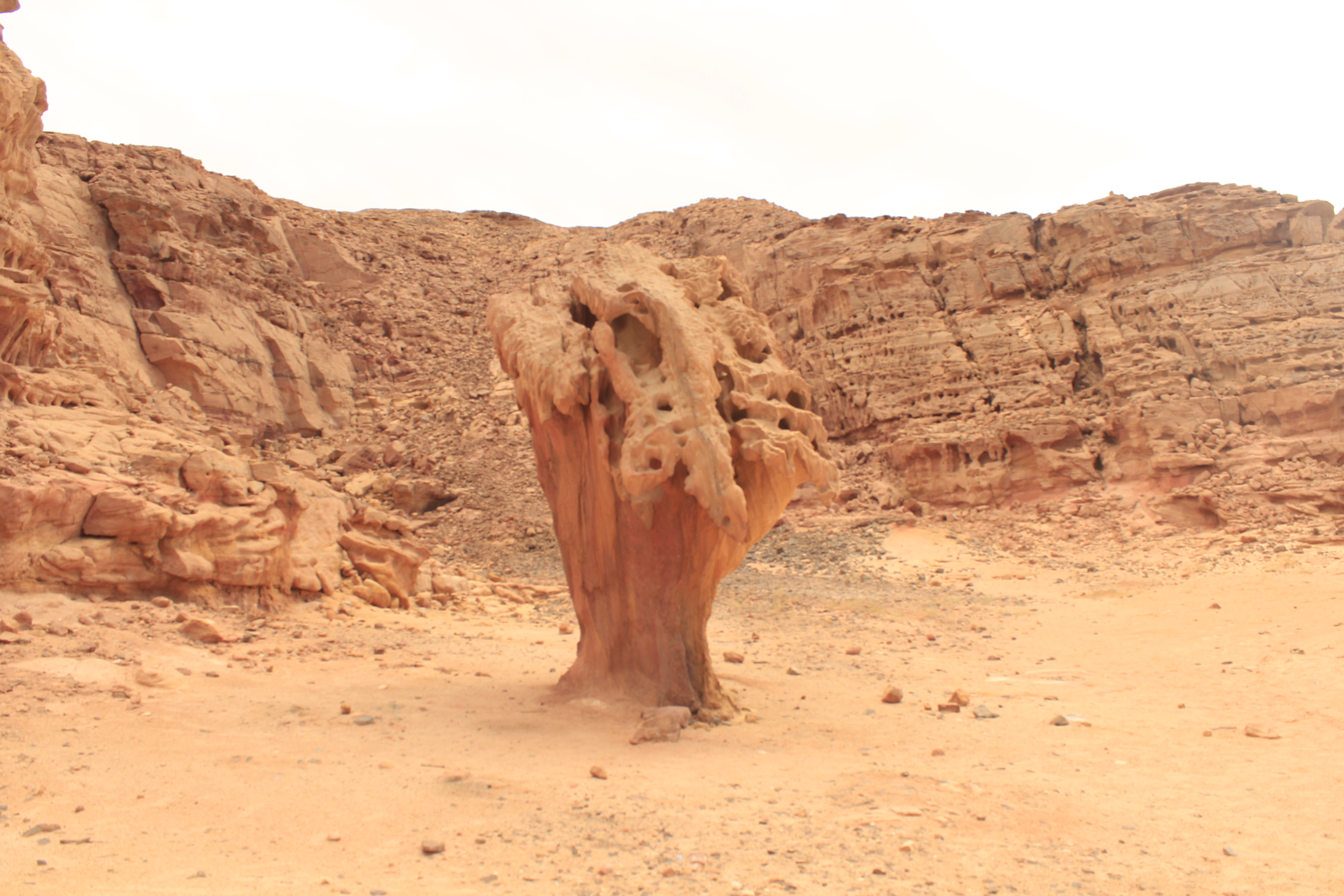
- Overview of Nuweiba

- Location in Egypt
- Coordinates: 29°2′N 34°40′E
- Country: Egypt
- Governorate: South Sinai
- Time zone: UTC+2 (EST)

Nuweiba (also spelled: Nueiba; Egyptian Arabic: نويبع, IPA: [neˈweːbeʕ]) is a coastal town in the eastern part of the Sinai Peninsula, Egypt, located on the coast of the Gulf of Aqaba.

== History ==
Historically, it is in the Asian part of Egypt, and the area was inhabited by two different ancient Bedouin tribes: the Tarabin to the north, and the Muzeina some 8 km (5 mi) to the south. After the Six-Day War when Israel occupied the area, a small town was established just 1.5 km (1 mi) south of Tarabeen under the Hebrew name of Neviot (Hebrew: נביעות). After the departure of the Israelis, former Egyptian President Hosni Mubarak expanded the settlement. Nuweiba Port, some 7 km (4 mi) to the south, was established and developed, with several car ferries running every day to Aqaba in Jordan by the Arab Bridge Maritime company, and with a small town growing up around it.

Nuweiba castle (or Newibah castle), built on top of the remains of a still older castle in 1893, has been proposed as a UNESCO World Heritage site.

== Geography ==
Nuweiba lies on a large flood plain measuring about 40 km^{2} (15 sq mi), sandwiched between the Sinai mountains and the Gulf of Aqaba, and is located some 150 km (90 mi) north of Sharm el Sheikh, 465 km (290 mi) southeast from Cairo and 70 km (40 mi) south of the Israel–Egypt border separating Taba and Eilat. Nuweiba Port was built in 1985 on the Gulf of Aqaba, and serves as a ferry port as well, facilitating between Jordan and Egypt.

=== Climate ===
Köppen-Geiger climate classification system classifies its climate as hot desert (BWh).

Most precipitation falls in February.

Climate data for Nuweiba
Month	Jan	Feb	Mar	Apr	May	Jun	Jul	Aug	Sep	Oct	Nov	Dec	Year
Mean daily maximum °C (°F)	20.8 (69.4)	22.5 (72.5)	25.4 (77.7)	29.2 (84.6)	32.9 (91.2)	35.7 (96.3)	36.5 (97.7)	36.8 (98.2)	34.4 (93.9)	31.3 (88.3)	26.6 (79.9)	22.1 (71.8)	29.5 (85.1)
Daily mean °C (°F)	15.6 (60.1)	16.9 (62.4)	19.7 (67.5)	23.2 (73.8)	26.3 (79.3)	29.5 (85.1)	30.7 (87.3)	30.9 (87.6)	29.0 (84.2)	25.8 (78.4)	21.3 (70.3)	16.8 (62.2)	23.8 (74.9)
Mean daily minimum °C (°F)	10.4 (50.7)	11.3 (52.3)	14.0 (57.2)	17.3 (63.1)	19.8 (67.6)	23.4 (74.1)	25.0 (77.0)	25.1 (77.2)	23.7 (74.7)	20.3 (68.5)	16.0 (60.8)	11.6 (52.9)	18.2 (64.7)
Average precipitation mm (inches)	1 (0.0)	3 (0.1)	3 (0.1)	1 (0.0)	0 (0)	0 (0)	0 (0)	0 (0)	0 (0)	1 (0.0)	2 (0.1)	2 (0.1)	13 (0.4)
Average rainy days	2	1	2	1	1	0	0	0	0	1	1	1	10
Mean daily sunshine hours	8	9	9	10	11	13	13	12	11	10	9	8	10
Source 1: Climate-Data.org
Source 2: Weather2Travel for rainy days and sunshine

Nuweiba mean sea temperature
Jan	Feb	Mar	Apr	May	Jun	Jul	Aug	Sep	Oct	Nov	Dec
22 °C (72 °F)	21 °C (70 °F)	21 °C (70 °F)	23 °C (73 °F)	25 °C (77 °F)	26 °C (79 °F)	28 °C (82 °F)	28 °C (82 °F)	28 °C (82 °F)	27 °C (81 °F)	25 °C (77 °F)	23 °C (73 °F)

== Tourism ==
Between the town and the port are a strip of modern hotels, catering to beach holiday makers and divers. One km north of Nuweiba City, Tarabin village is well known for its Bedouin-style camps where cheap huts are available for rent. Further north, in the direction of Taba, are several other beaches with similar accommodation options.

== Gallery ==
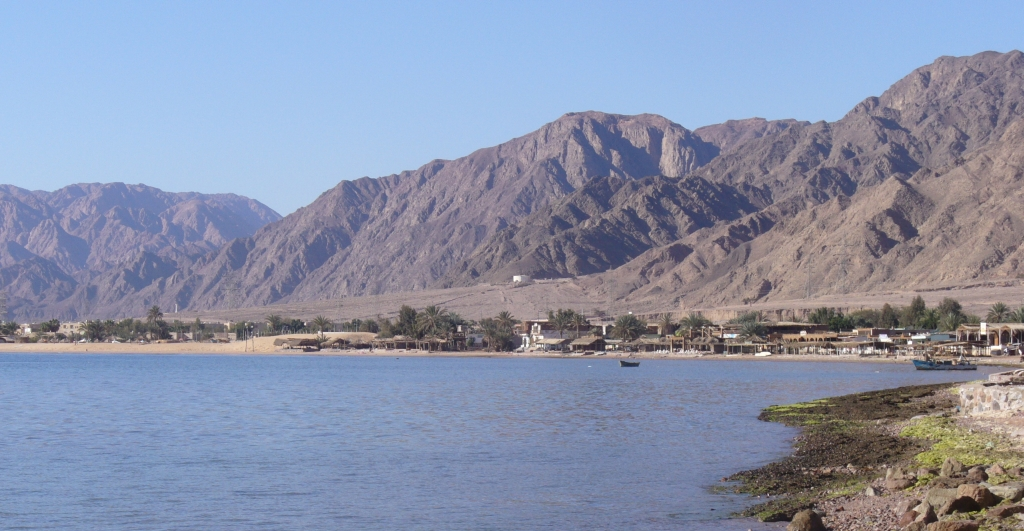
View of the coast, Nuweiba Tarabin

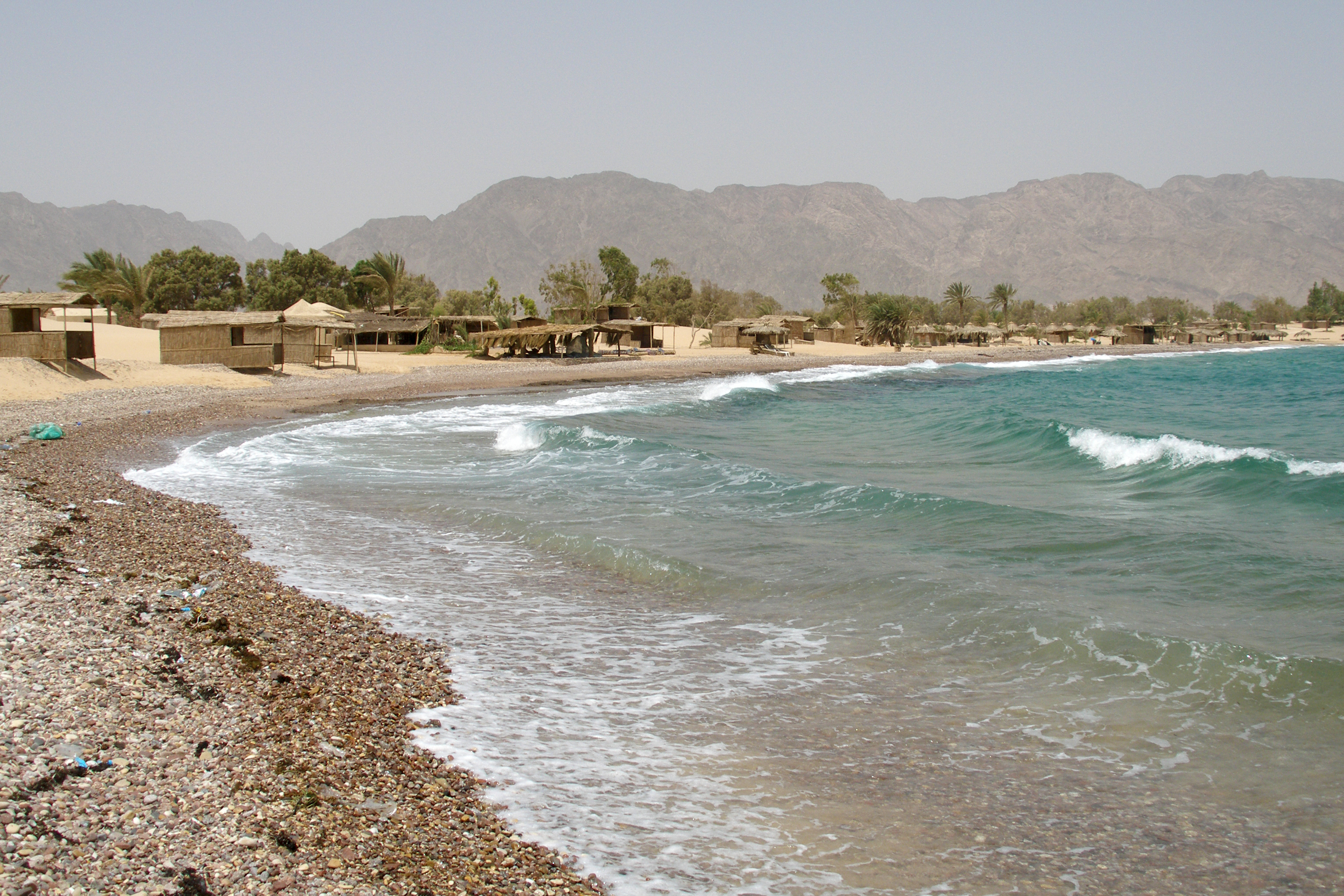
The beach of Nuweiba

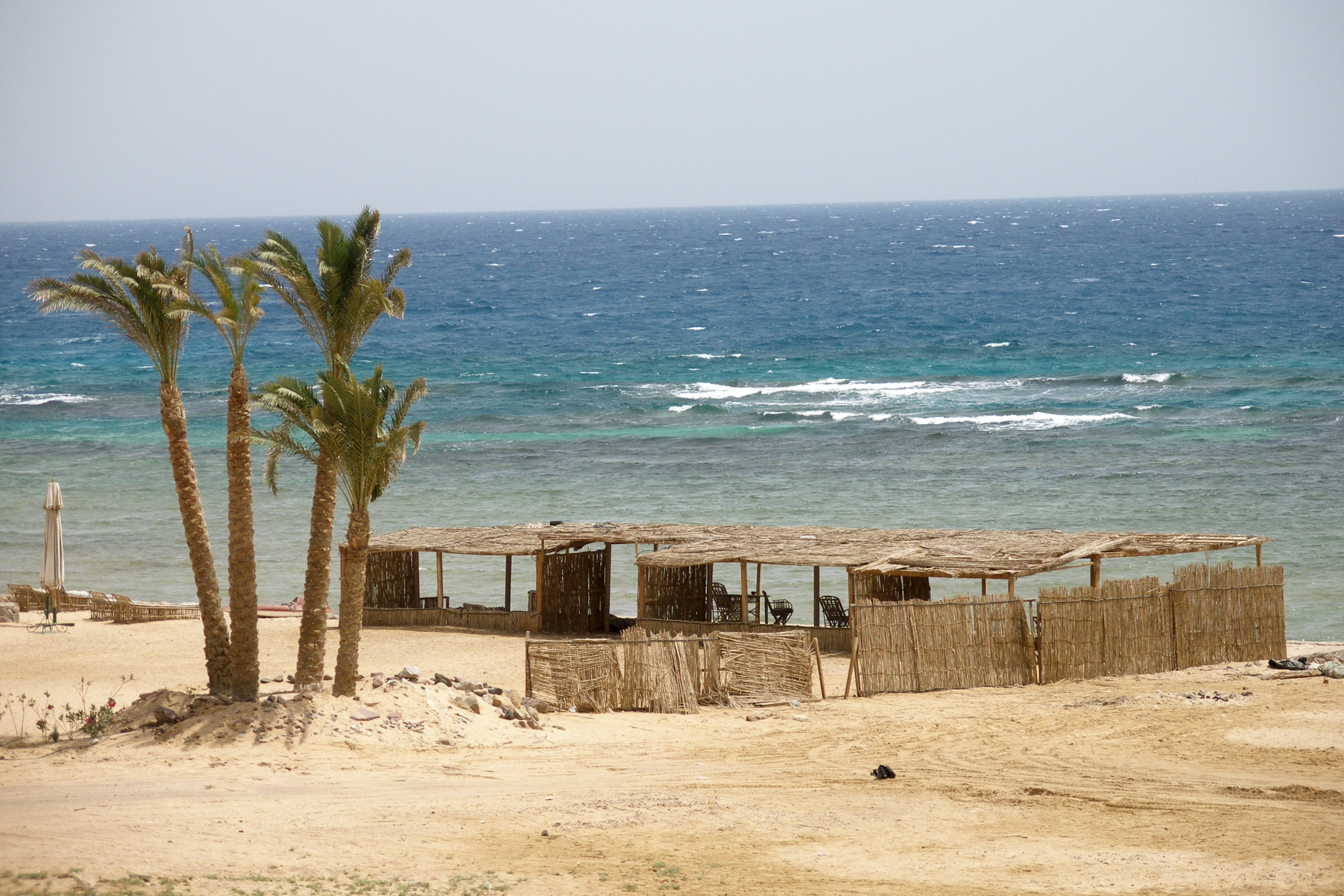
Beach shack

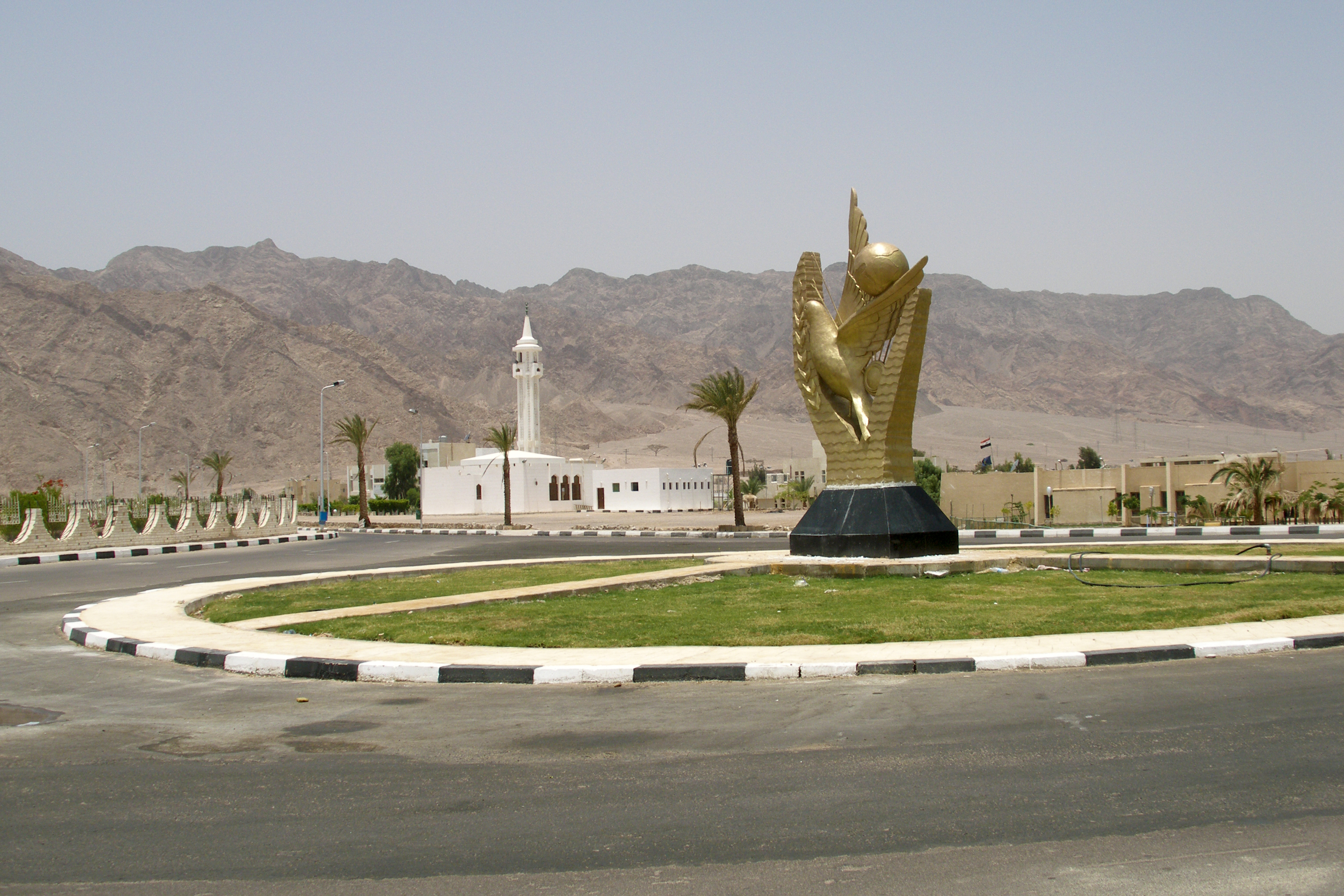
Roundabout

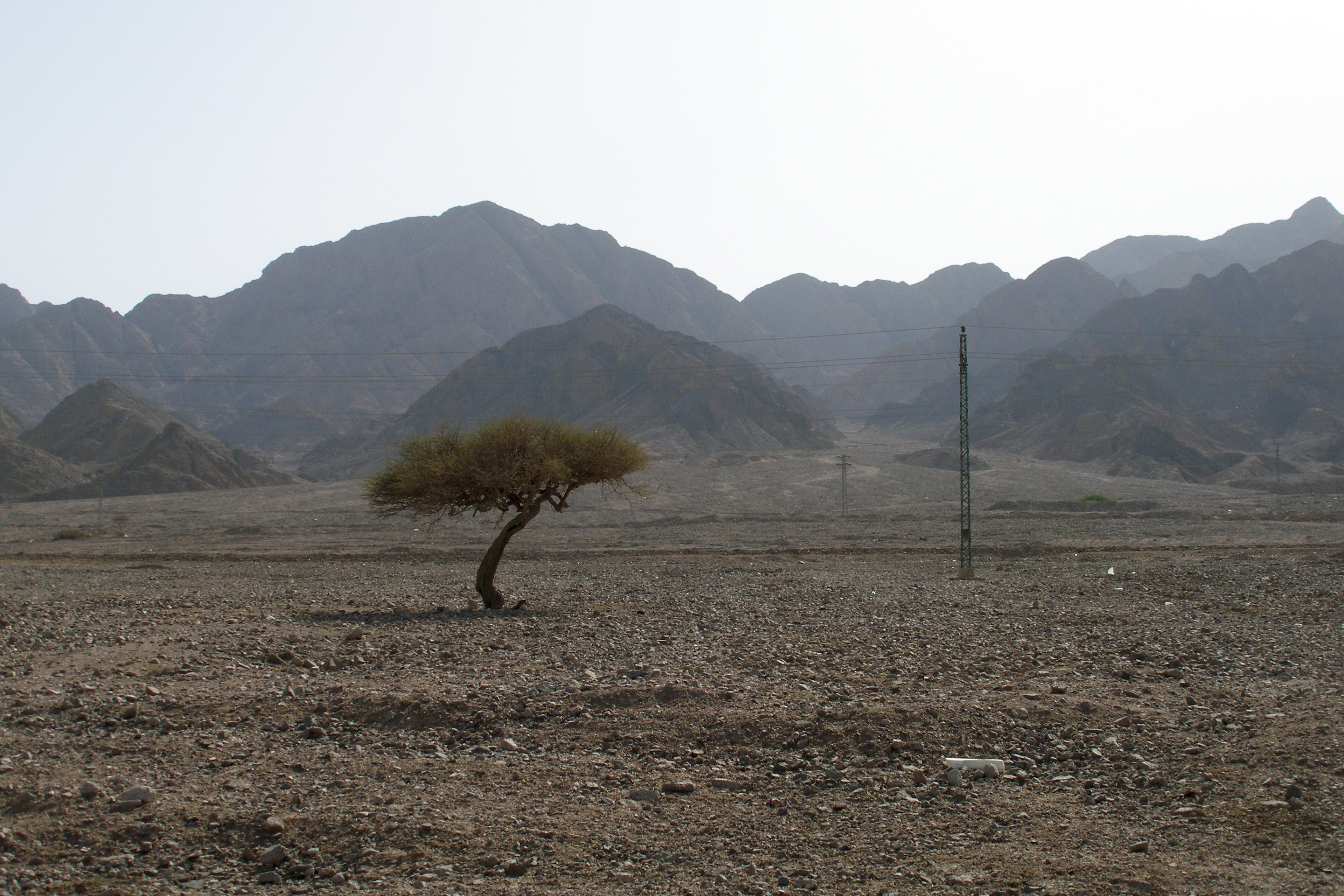
Desert near Nuweiba

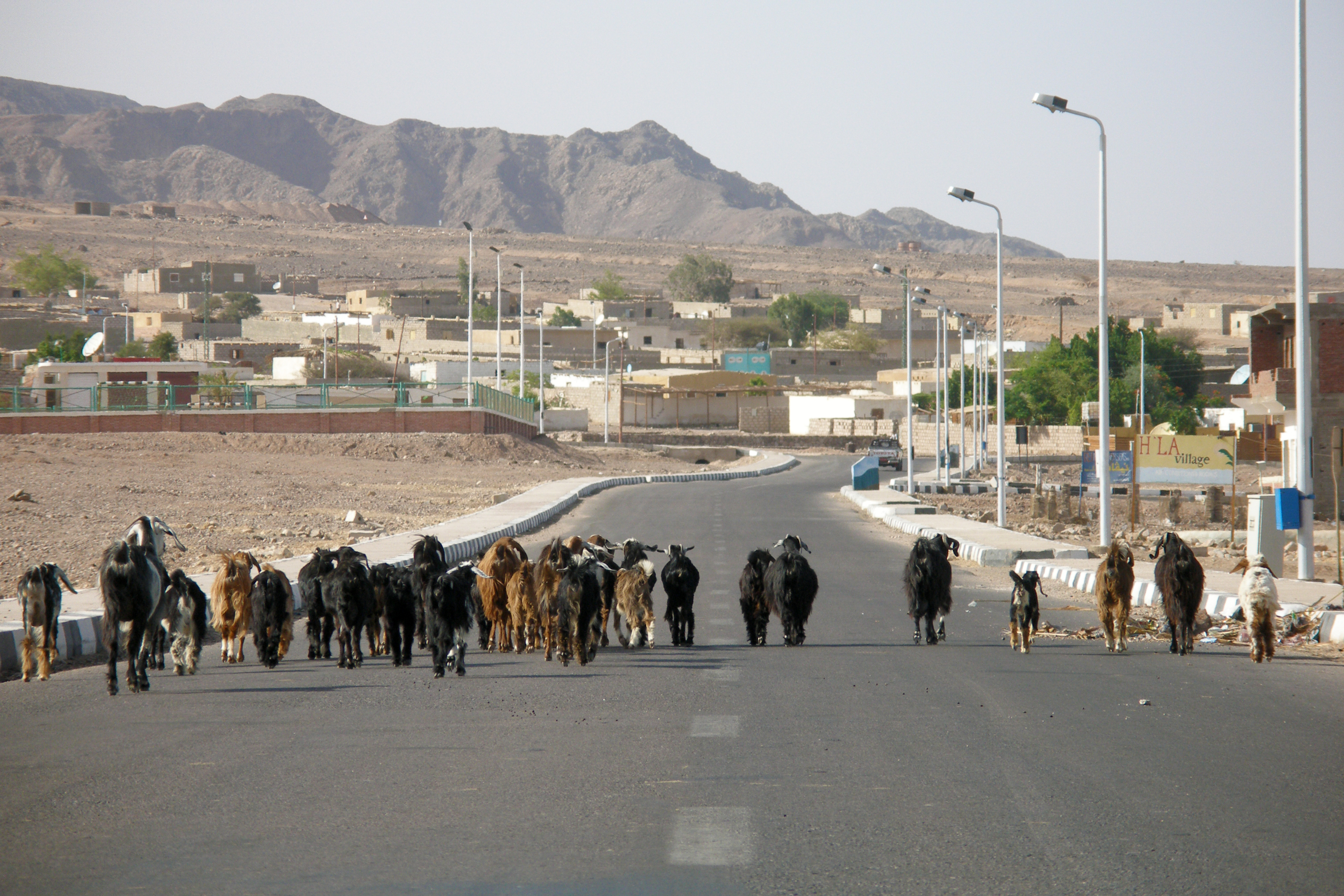
Goats on the road

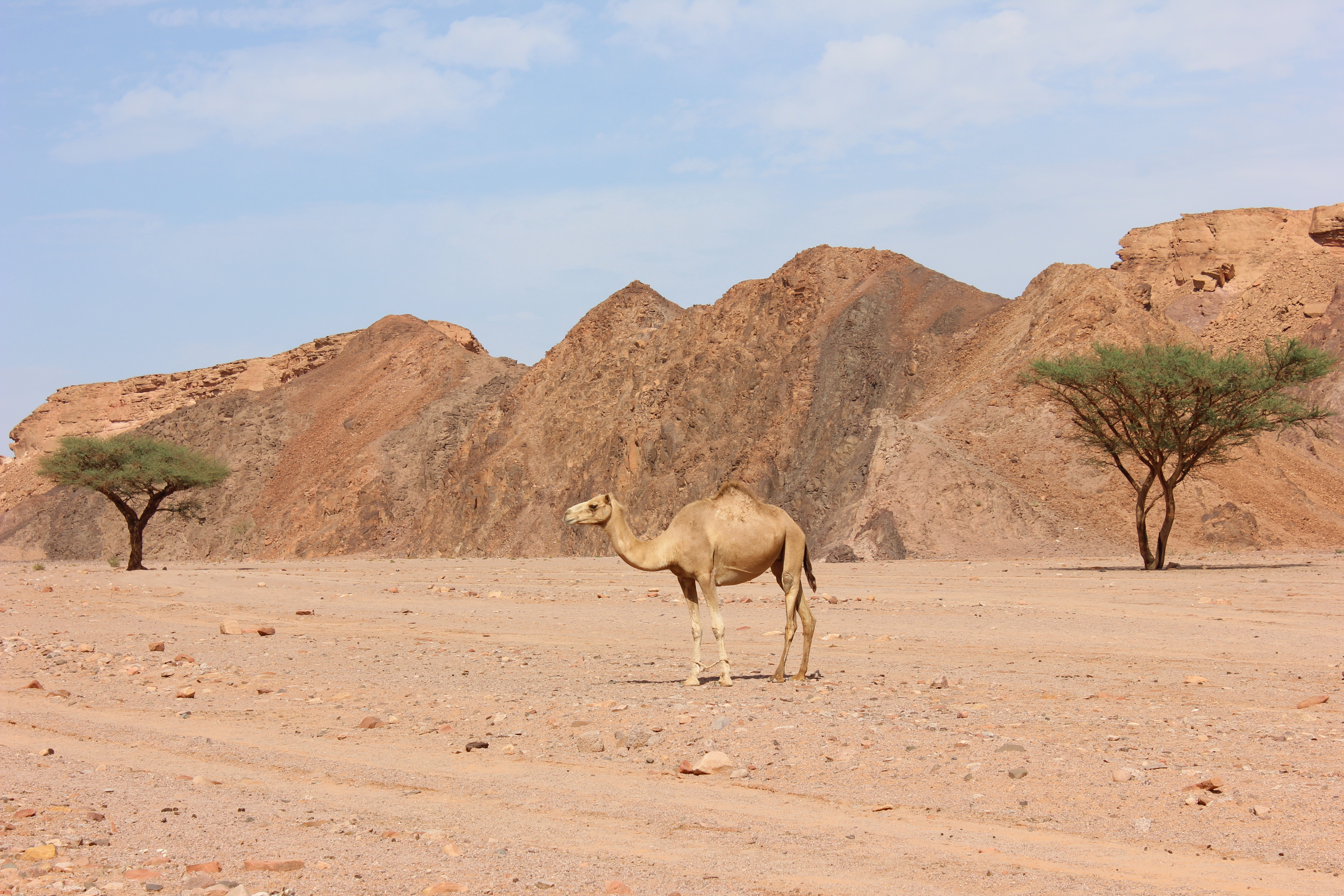
Camel near Nuweiba

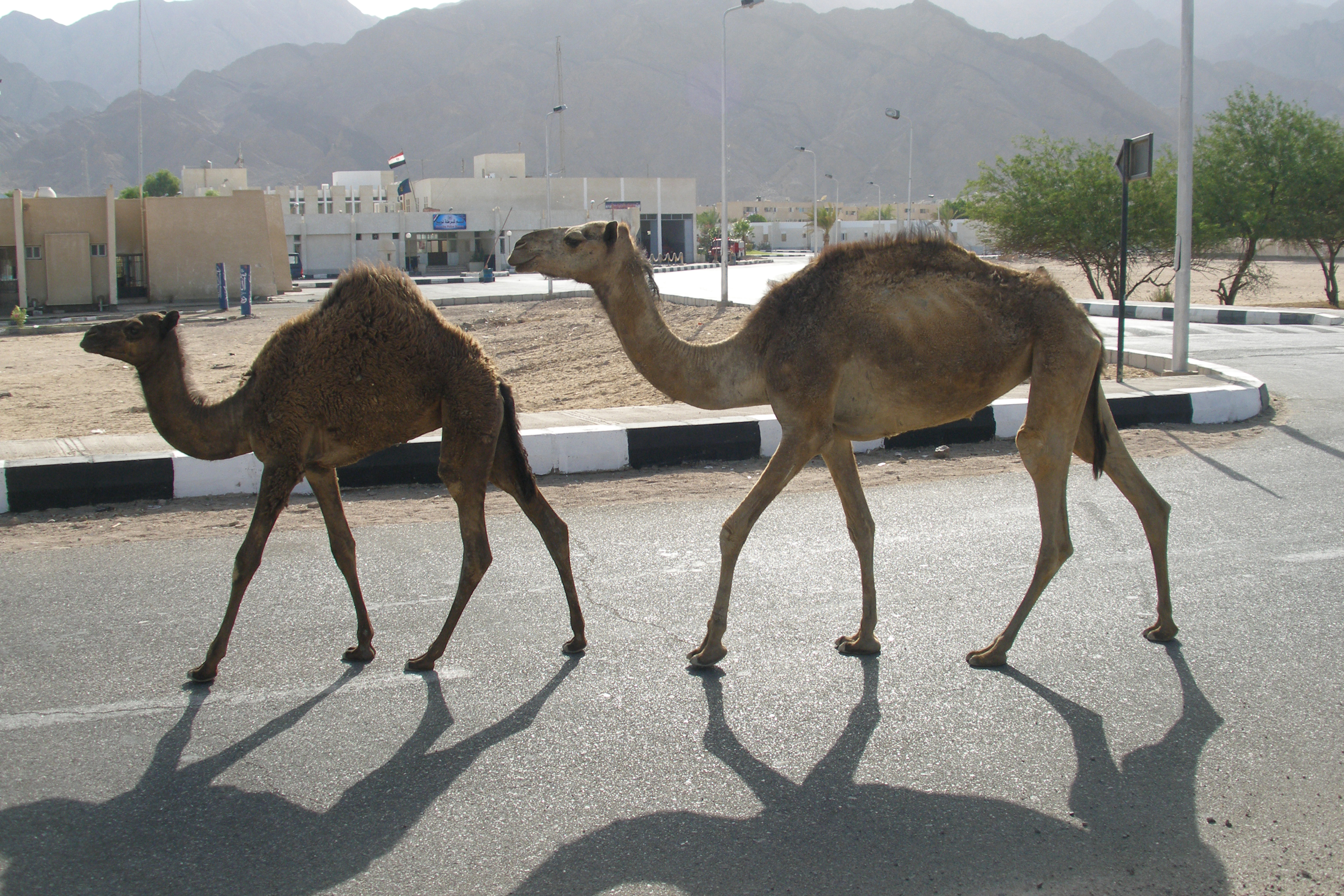
Camels roaming through Nuweiba

== See also ==
- Arab Bridge Maritime
- Coloured Canyon
- Red Sea Riviera
