= Terrorism in Egypt =

List of terrorist attacks in Egypt from the 1940s to the present day

Islamic Terrorism in Egypt
- Part of Terrorism in Egypt, the Egyptian Crisis, the war on terror, and the Arab Winter, and the Sinai insurgency
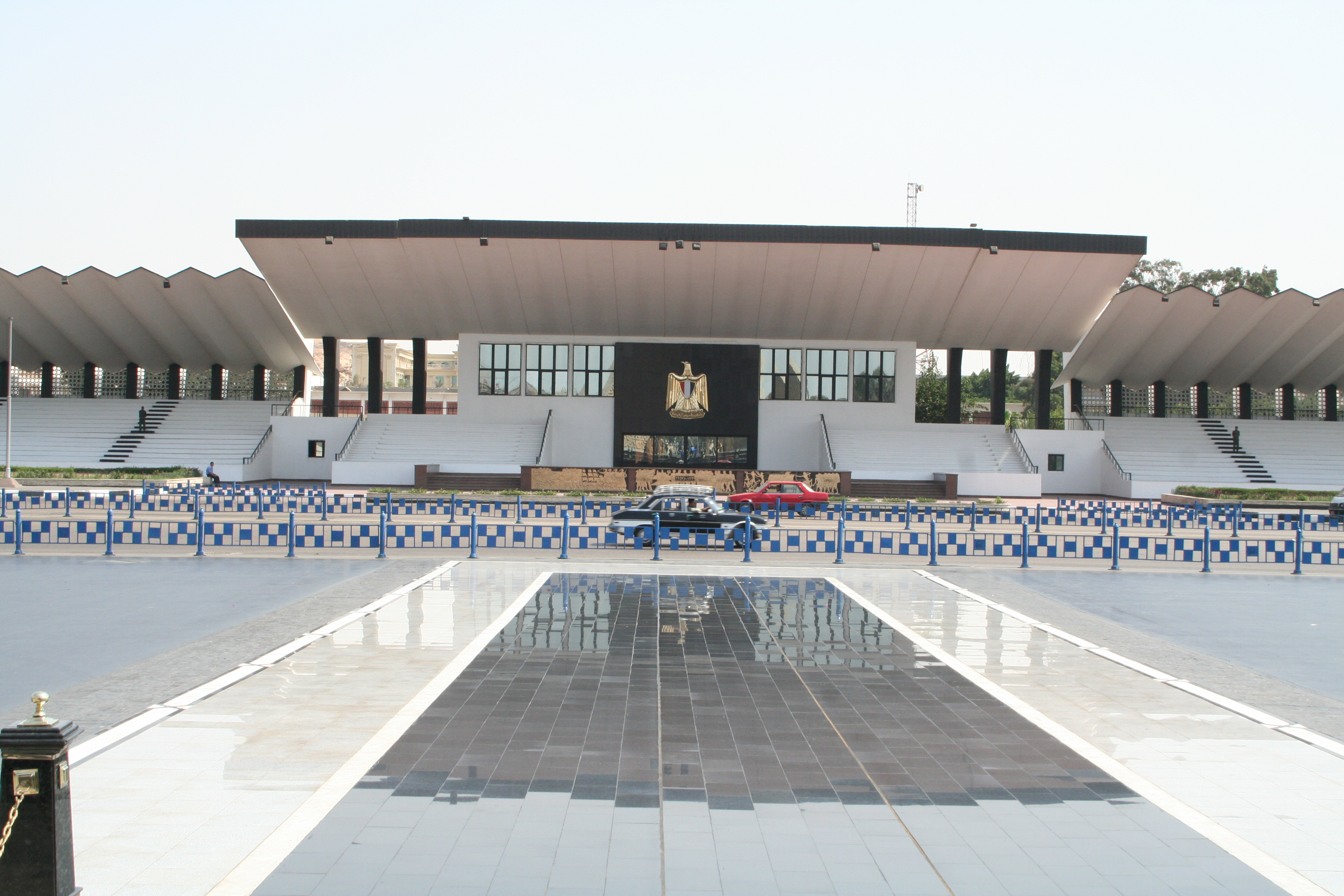
- Platform where Anwar Sadat was assassinated.
Date	6 October 1981 – 2026
Location	Egypt
Result	Egyptian Victory

Belligerents
(Egypt) Egyptian Government; Armed Forces; Egyptian Army; Egyptian Air Force; Egyptian Navy; Egyptian Air Defense Forces; Ministry of Interior; National Security Sector; National Police; Central Security Forces; Sinai Tribal Union	Islamists: EIJ (1979–2001); al-Jama'a al-Islamiyya (1992–1998); ABM (until late 2014); Al-Qaeda; AQSP (2011–2018); Abdullah Azzam Brigades (2009–2015); Tawhid al-Jihad (2008–2012); Ansar al-Sharia (until 2018); Hasm Movement; Jund al-Islam (until 2020); Al-Mourabitoun (until 2020); Popular Resistance (until 2015); Takfir wal-Hijra; Army of Islam; Al Furqan Brigades (until 2014); Soldiers of Egypt (until 2015); Islamic State (since 2014); Wilāyat Sīnāʾ; Wilāyat Miṣr; Mujahideen Shura Council

Commanders and leaders
Abdel Fattah el-Sisi (Egypt) Mostafa Madbouly Mahmoud Tawfik Abdel Mageed Saqr Ahmed Fathy Khalifa Ashraf Ibrahim Atwa Mahmoud Foaad Abd El-Gawad Mohamed Hegazy Abdul Mawgoud; Former: Anwar Sadat †; Sufi Abu Taleb; Hosni Mubarak (POW); Mohamed Morsi (POW); Adly Mansour; (Egypt) Ahmad Fuad Mohieddin; (Egypt) Kamal Hassan Ali; (Egypt) Aly Lotfy Mahmoud; (Egypt) Atef Sedky; (Egypt) Kamal Ganzouri; (Egypt) Atef Ebeid; (Egypt) Ahmed Nazif; (Egypt) Ahmed Shafik; (Egypt) Essam Sharaf; (Egypt) Hesham Qandil (POW); (Egypt) Hazem El Beblawi; (Egypt) Ibrahim Mahlab; (Egypt) Sherif Ismail; Nabawi Ismail; Hassan Abu Basha; Ahmed Rushdi; Zaki Badr; Abdul Halim Moussa; Habib el-Adly; Mahmoud Wagdy; Mansour el-Essawy; Mohamed Youssef Ibrahim; Ahmed Gamal El Din; Mohamed Ibrahim Moustafa; Magdy Abdel Ghaffar; Abd Al-Halim Abu-Ghazala; Youssef Sabri Abu Taleb; Muhammad Hussein Tantawy; Abdel Fattah el-Sisi; Sedki Sobhy; Mohamed Ahmed Zaki; Abd Rab el-Nabi; Ibrahim El-Orabi; Safi al-Din Abu Shnaaf; Salah Halabi; Magdy Hatata; Hamdy Wahiba; Sami Hafez Anan; Mahmoud Hegazy; Mohammed Farid Hegazy; Osama Askar; Ashraf Refaat; Mohamed Ali Mohamed; Ali Tawfik Gad; Sherif Alsadek; Ahmed Fadel; Ahmed Saber Selim; Tamer Abdel Alim; Mohab Mamish; Osama El-Gendi; Osama Mounir Rabie; Ahmed Khaled Hassan Saeed; Mohammed Shabana; Mohamed Abd El Hamid Helmy; Mohamed Alaa El Din Barakat; Ahmed Abdel Rahman Nasser; Magdy Galal Sharawi; Reda Mahmoud Hafez Mohamed; Younes Hamed; Mohamed Abbas Helmy; El-Said Hamdy; Adel Khalil; Mostafa El-Shazly; Zaher Abd El-Rahman; Ahmed Abou Talib; Mohamed Abdel Hamid El-Shahat; Sami Hafez Anan; Abd El Aziz Seif-Eldeen; Abdul Meniem Al-Toras; Aly Fahmy Mohammed Aly Fahmi	Abu Hafs al-Hashimi al-Qurashi Abu Hajar al-Hashemi Mohammed Badie; Former: Umar al-Tilmisani (POW); Muhammad Hamid Abu al-Nasr; Mustafa Mashhur; Ma'mun al-Hudaybi; Mohammed Mahdi Akef (POW); Khairat el-Shater (POW); Waleed Waked (POW); Ibrahim Mohamed Freg †; Shadi el-Manaei †; Mohammed Eid Muslih Hamad (POW); Majid bin Muhammad al-Majid (POW); Saleh Al-Qaraawi (POW); Humam Muhammed †; Ezz al-Din al-Masri †; Muhammad al-Zawahiri (POW); Abd El-Fattah Salem (POW); Fayez Abu-Sheta †; Youssif Abo-Ayat †; Saed Abo-Farih †; Khalid al-Islambouli (executed); Muhammad abd-al-Salam Faraj (executed); Osama bin Laden †; Ayman al-Zawahiri †; Abu Bakr al-Baghdadi †; Abu Ibrahim al-Hashimi al-Qurashi †; Abu al-Hasan al-Hashimi al-Qurashi †; Abu al-Hussein al-Husseini al-Qurashi †; Salim Salma Said Mahmoud al-Hamadin †; Abu Osama al-Masri †; Selim Suleiman Al-Haram †; Ashraf Ali Hassanein Gharabali †; Yunis Hunnar †; Abū al-Muḥtasib al-Maqdisī (POW) Hesham Ashmawy (executed)

Strength
Total: 25,000 (41 battalions)	Total: ≈12,000 IS: 1000-1500

Casualties and losses
3,277 killed 12,280 Injured IDF: 1 killed	Thousands killed, arrested, captured, or surrendered
- Civilian fatalities: 1,539+ Egyptian, 219 Russians, 4 Ukrainians, 1 Belarusian, 3 South Koreans, 3 Vietnamese, 2 Germans, 1 Croatian; Total: 5,853–7,353+ killed

Terrorism in Egypt in the 20th and 21st centuries has targeted the Egyptian government officials, Egyptian police and Egyptian army members, tourists, Sufi Mosques and the Christian minority. Many attacks have been linked to Islamic extremism, and terrorism increased in the 1990s when the Islamist movement al-Gama'a al-Islamiyya targeted high-level political leaders and killed hundreds – including civilians – in its pursuit of implementing traditional Sharia law in Egypt.

Ayman al-Zawahiri, an Egyptian doctor and leader of Egyptian Islamic Jihad group, was believed to be behind the operations of al-Qaeda.

== Muslim Brotherhood (1940s–50s) ==
In 1943, the Islamist Muslim Brotherhood group—a very large and active organization at that time—was thought to have established "a 'secret apparatus'" i.e. "a separate organization for paramilitary activity under the direct authority" the Brotherhood's head, Sheikh Hassan al-Banna." In 1948, the group is thought to have assassinated appellate judge Ahmad El Khazindar in retaliation for his passing a "severe sentence" against another member of the Brotherhood.

After the 1948 victory of Israel over the Arab coalition, the group is believed to have set fire to homes of Jews in Cairo in June 1948 in retaliation. In July, two large department stores in Cairo owned by Jews were also burned. A couple of months later police captured documents and plans of the 'secret apparatus. 32 of its leaders were arrested and its offices were raided, and shortly thereafter Prime Minister Mahmoud El Nokrashy Pasha ordered the dissolution of the Brotherhood.

On 28 December 1948, Prime Minister Mahmoud El Nokrashy Pasha was shot and assassinated by Abdel Meguid Ahmed Hassan, a veterinary student and member of the Brotherhood. The country was shocked and traditionalist clergy condemned the act. The Grand Mufti, Imam of Azhar mosque and the Council of Ulema all condemned the perpetrators as kuffar.

Less than two months later the head of the Brotherhood, Hasan al-Banna, was himself victim of an assassination, the perpetrators thought to be supporters of the murdered premier.

After a nationalist military coup led by Gamal Abdel Nasser overthrew the Egyptian monarchy, the Brotherhood was very disappointed to find the officers were secular in orientation and the Brotherhood did not gain influence. On 26 October 1954, a member of the brotherhood attempted to assassinate President Nasser and a general suppression of the Brotherhood followed, including imprisonment of thousands of members and the execution of six of its most prominent leaders.

== Lavon affair (1954) ==
A covert operation under the direction of Israeli military intelligence attempted to destabilize the Nasser government in the summer of 1954 through terrorist bombings of Egyptian, American and British government facilities. The operation was unsuccessful and the Israeli-trained Egyptian Jewish operatives who planted the bombs were all captured, although all of their Israeli handlers escaped. The Lavon Affair, so named because Israeli Defense Minister Pinhas Lavon was later implicated and forced to resign, was a false flag operation with evidence planted at the bomb sites implicating the Muslim Brotherhood. The State Security was responsible for the interrogation of the Jewish suspects and managed to gather important information by torture.

== Influence of Sayyid Qutb (1980s–2000s) ==
In the 1980s, 1990s, and 2000s, terrorist attacks in Egypt became more numerous and severe, and began to target Christian Copts and foreign tourists as well as government officials. This trend surprised some foreigners who thought of Egypt as a country that "embraced" foreigners "with suffocating affection" and preferred a "tolerant brand of Islam". Some scholars and authors have credited Islamist writer Sayyid Qutb as the inspiration for the new wave of attacks.

Qutb was author of Ma'alim fi al-Tariq (Milestones), a manifesto for a jihad of "physical force" to eliminate "the kingdom of man", and bring about "the kingdom of God on earth". According to his theory, sometimes referred to as Qutbism, Islam was not just in need of revival but had actually ceased to exist. "The Muslim community has been extinct for a few centuries, having fallen back into a state of pagan ignorance" known as jahiliyyah because of the failure of the world Muslim community to obey Shariah law. To rectify the situation, "the organizations and authorities of the jahili system" would have to be abolished by "physical power and Jihad", by a "vanguard" movement of true Muslims, distinct from that Jahili society. Qutb emphasized the all-encompassing irredeemable awfulness of jahili society, the wickedness and cruelty of those opposed to the movement of true Muslims, and the utter worthlessness of Western civilization. His book has been called "one of the most influential works in Arabic of the last half century". It became a best seller, went through many editions and strongly influenced Islamists in prison in Egypt. Qutb, who had been executed in 1967 after another purported plot to assassinate of Abdel Nasser, became a shahid to his supporters.

== Military Technical College attack (1974) ==
On 18 April 1974, 100 members of the Islamic Liberation Organization (or Shabab Muhammad Group) stormed the armory of the Military Technical College in Cairo, seizing weapons and vehicles. Led by Salih Sirriya they hoped to kill President Anwar El Sadat and other top Egyptian officials – who were attending an official event nearby in the Arab Socialist Building – seize radio and television buildings (also nearby) and announce the birth of an Islamic State under the leadership of Hizb ut-Tahrir. 11 were killed and 27 wounded in the attempt as security forces were able to intercept conspirators before they left the academy. 95 ILO members are arrested and tried. 32 were convicted. Two were executed.

== Takfir wal-Hijra (1977) ==
On 3 July 1977, a group known to the public as Takfir wal-Hijra (excommunication and exile), kidnapped former Egyptian government minister Muhammad al-Dhahabi. The group was led by a self-taught Islamic preacher Shukri Mustafa, and called themselves Jama'at al-Muslimin. Among their demands in exchange for al-Dhahabi's release were the release of 60 of Takfir wal-Hijra members from jail, public apologies from the press for negative stories about the group, the publication of a book by Mustafa, and 200,000 Egyptian pounds in cash. Instead of complying, the press publicized "a long list of offenses and crimes attributed to the group." Four days after the kidnapping, al-Dhahabi's body was found. The murder provoked indignation among the Egyptian public and extensive police raids led to the arrests of 410 of the group's members.

== Salvation from Hell (1980s) ==
Salvation from Hell sought to establish an Islamic state using force. The Egyptian government broke off ties with Iran following allegations that Iran funded the group. Yasser Borhamy was detained for a month in 1987 due to his alleged connection with the assassination attempt against interior minister Hassan Abu Basha. The group was also responsible for an assassination attempt on former interior minister Nabawi Ismail.

== Tanzim al-Jihad movement (1981) ==
=== Targeting Christians ===
In spring of 1981, Sheikh Omar Abdel-Rahman agreed to become the mufti of the shura (council) of underground Egyptian group Tanzim al-Jihad, the forerunner of Egyptian Islamic Jihad and al-Gama'a al-Islamiyya. He issued a fatwa sanctioning "the robbery and killing of Copts in furtherance of the jihad".

=== Sadat assassination and uprising ===
By 1981 President Anwar Sadat had become unpopular among some Egyptians and enraged Islamists by signing of a peace treaty with Israel. On 6 October 1981, Sadat and six diplomats were assassinated while observing a military parade commemorating the eighth anniversary of the October 1973 War. Lieutenant Colonel Khalid Islambouli and two other members of the Tanzim al-Jihad movement fired machine guns and threw grenades into the reviewing stand.

In conjunction with the assassination of Sadat, Tanzim al-Jihad began an insurrection in Asyut in Upper Egypt. Rebels took control of the city for a few days on 8 October 1981 before paratroopers from Cairo restored government control. 68 policemen and soldiers were killed in the fighting, but sentences of arrested militants were relatively light, with most of them serving only three years in prison.

== Attacks on Israelis (1985–2024) ==
The Ras Burqa massacre was a shooting attack in October 1985 on Israeli vacationers in Ras Burqa, a beach resort area in the Sinai peninsula, in which seven Israelis were killed, including four children. Egypt refused to allow the victims to be treated by Israeli doctors or transferred to hospitals in Israel.

On 4 February 1990, a bus carrying tourists in Egypt was attacked by members of the Palestinian Islamic Jihad. Eleven people were killed, including nine Israelis, and 17 wounded (sixteen of whom were Israelis). This was the fourth attack on Israeli tourists in Egypt since the signing of the peace treaty.

In November 1990, an Egyptian border guard crossed the border into Israel and opened fire with his AK-47 on vehicles on the Eilat-Kadesh Barnea road killing four people.

Twelve of the people killed in the 2004 Sinai bombings were Israeli.

The Sinai bus crash in August 2006, in which 11 Arab Israelis were killed, may have been premeditated. Families of the victims allege that evidence collected, including the driver's derogatory and threatening remarks attacking them for being Arabs and Israeli, indicate they were targeted by a cell.

On 3 June 2023 an Egyptian police officer killed 3 Israelis soldiers in border shootings.

On 8 October 2023 an Egyptian police officer murdered 2 Israeli tourists and an Egyptian tourist guide in Alexandria,

On 8 May 2024 a group calling themselves "Vanguards of Liberation - the Martyr Mohammad Salah group" claimed to have killed an Israeli CEO of food export company O.K group in Alexandria describing him as an Israeli agent and saying that his killing was in retaliation for the massacres in Gaza.

== Attacks during the 1990s ==
Terrorism deaths in Egypt (1970–2015)

The violent Islamic insurgency during the 1990s targeted police and government officials but also civilians including tourists. Al-Gama'a al-Islamiyya was the primary perpetrator of the attacks, but Egyptian Islamic Jihad also was involved.

=== Rifaat el-Mahgoub assassination ===
In October 1990, Egyptian Islamic Jihad attempted to assassinate Egyptian Interior Minister Abdel Halim Moussa, but ended up killing parliamentary Speaker Rifaat el-Mahgoub.

=== Daylight ambushes ===
1993 was a particularly severe year for terrorist attacks in Egypt. 1106 persons were killed or wounded. More police (120) than terrorists (111) were killed that year and "several senior police officials and their bodyguards were shot dead in daylight ambushes."

=== Cairo attacks ===
On 18 April 1996, gunmen opened fire on Greek tourists who were about to board a bus outside Cairo's Europa Hotel, near the pyramids. Seventeen Greeks and an Egyptian were killed, and 15 Greeks and an Egyptian were also wounded.

On 18 September 1997, gunmen attacked tourist buses parked outside the Egyptian Museum in Tahrir Square, killing nine tourists, including seven Germans, and wounding 19.

=== Luxor massacre ===
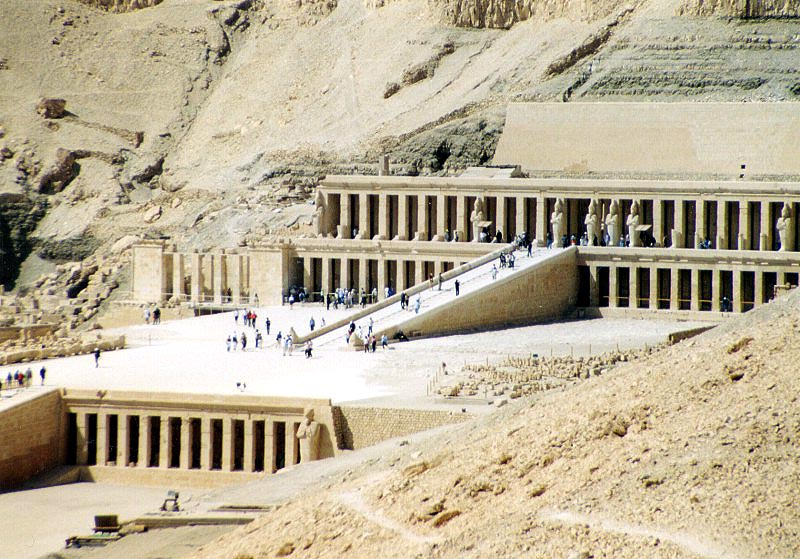
Djeser-Djeseru

The Luxor Massacre took place on 17 November 1997, at Deir el-Bahri, an archaeological site and tourist destination located across the River Nile from Luxor, Egypt. In the mid-morning attack, Islamic terrorists from Al-Gama'a al-Islamiyya ("The Islamic Group") and Talaa'al al-Fateh (Vanguards of Conquest), both of which are suspected of having ties to al-Qaeda, massacred 58 tourists at the attraction. The six assailants, armed with automatic firearms and knives, were disguised as members of the security forces. They descended on the Temple of Hatshepsut at around 08:45 and massacred 62 people, their modus operandi including beheadings and disembowellings. The attackers then hijacked a bus, but armed Egyptian tourist police and military forces arrived soon afterwards and engaged in a gun battle with the six terrorists, who were later killed or committed suicide.

== Attacks during the 2000s ==
=== 2004 Sinai bombing ===
The 2004 Sinai bombings were three bomb attacks targeting tourist hotels in the Sinai Peninsula, Egypt, on 7 October 2004. The attacks killed 34 people and injured 171. The explosions occurred in the Hilton Taba in Taba and campsites used by Israelis in Ras al-Shitan. In the Taba attack, a truck drove into the lobby of the Taba Hilton and exploded, killing 31 people and wounding some 159 others. Ten floors of the hotel collapsed following the blast. Some 50 kilometers (31 mi) south, at campsites at Ras al-Shitan, near Nuweiba, two more bombings happened. A car parked in front of a restaurant at the Moon Island resort exploded, killing three Israelis and a Bedouin. Twelve were wounded. Another blast happened moments later, targeting the Baddiyah camp, but did not harm anyone because the bomber had apparently been scared off from entering the campground by a guard.

Of the dead, many were foreigners: 12 were from Israel, two from Italy, one from Russia, and one was an Israeli-American. The rest of the dead were believed to be Egyptian. According to the Egyptian government, the bombers were Palestinians who had tried to enter Israel to carry out attacks there but were unsuccessful. The mastermind, Iyad Saleh, recruited Egyptians and Bedouins to gain explosives to be used in the attacks.

=== April 2005 attacks ===
The April 2005 attacks in Cairo were three related incidents that took place in Cairo on 7 April and 30 April 2005. Two incidents caused no loss of life other than those of the perpetrators and appear not to have been planned in advance; in the first attack, however, three bystanders were killed. Two groups claimed responsibility – the Mujahedeen of Egypt and the Abdullah Azzam Brigades. In its statement, the latter group said the attacks were in retaliation for the government's clampdown on dissidents in the wake of the Sinai Peninsula bombings. In the early hours of 1 May, security forces arrested some 225 individuals for questioning, mostly from the dead three's home villages and from the area where they lived in Shubra. Particularly keenly sought was Muhammad Yassin, the teenage brother of Ehab Yousri Yassin, whom the police described as the only remaining suspect in the bazaar bomb attack and a material witness to the shooting. Over the course of the weekend, it also emerged that all the attackers were relatives of Ashraf Said, a suspect in the 7 April bombing who was taken in for questioning and died in police custody on 29 April.

=== 2005 Sharm el-Sheikh attacks ===
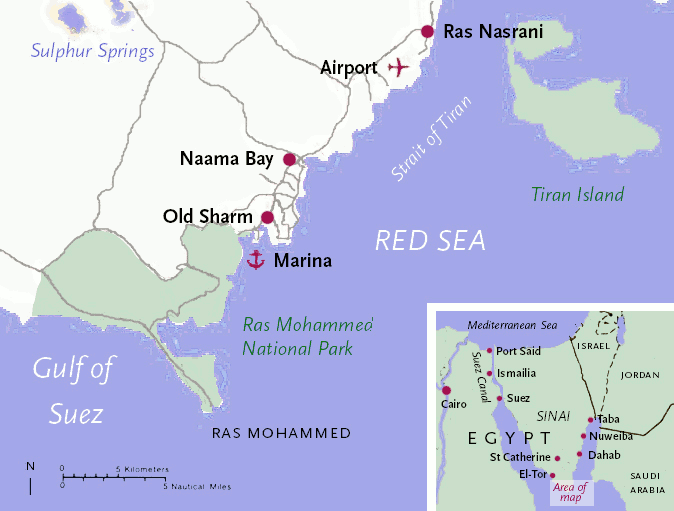
Sharm el-Sheikh is located on the coast of the Red Sea, at the southern tip of the Sinai Peninsula.

The 2005 Sharm el-Sheikh attacks were a series of bomb attacks on 23 July 2005, targeting the Egyptian resort city of Sharm el-Sheikh, located on the southern tip of the Sinai Peninsula. 88 people were killed and over 150 were wounded by the blasts. The bombing coincided with Egypt's Revolution Day, which commemorates Nasser's 1952 overthrow of King Farouk.

The attacks took place in the early morning hours, at a time when many tourists and locals were still out at restaurants, cafés and bars. The first bomb blast, at 01:15 local time (22:15 UTC), was reported in a market in downtown Sharm; shortly after, another was reported to have hit the Ghazala Gardens hotel in the Naama Bay area, a strip of beachfront hotels some 6 km from the town centre.

While the official government toll a few days after the blast was 64, hospitals reported that 88 people had been killed in the bombings. The majority of dead and wounded casualties were Egyptians. Among those killed were 11 Britons, two Germans, one Czech, six Italians, one Israeli, and one American. Other casualties, dead and wounded, included foreign visitors from France, Kuwait, the Netherlands, Qatar, Russia, and Spain.

A group calling itself the Abdullah Azzam Brigades (a reference to militant Islamist ideologue Abdullah Yusuf Azzam) was the first to claim responsibility for the attacks. On a website the group stated that "holy warriors targeted the Ghazala Gardens hotel and the Old Market in Sharm el-Sheikh" and claimed it has ties to Al-Qaeda. Additional claims were later made by two other groups calling themselves the "Tawhid and Jihad Group in Egypt" and "Holy Warriors of Egypt".

=== 2006 Dahab bombings ===
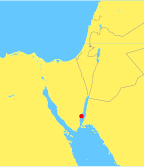
The seaside town of Dahab is located on the Gulf of Aqaba

The Dahab bombings of 24 April 2006 were three bomb attacks on the Egyptian resort city of Dahab. The resorts are popular with Western tourists and Egyptians alike during the holiday season.

At about 19:15 local time on 24 April 2006 – a public holiday in celebration of Sham Al-Nasseim (Spring festival or Easter) – a series of bombs exploded in tourist areas of Dahab, a resort located on the Gulf of Aqaba coast of the Sinai Peninsula. One blast occurred in or near the Nelson restaurant, one near the Aladdin café (both being on both sides of the bridge), and one near the Ghazala market. At least 23 people were killed, mostly Egyptians, but including a German, Lebanese, Russian, Swiss, and a Hungarian. Around 80 people were wounded, including tourists from Australia, Denmark, France, Germany, Israel, South Korea, Lebanon, Palestine, United Kingdom, and the United States.

The governor of South Sinai reported that the blasts might have been suicide attacks, but later Habib Adly, the interior minister of Egypt said that the devices were nail bombs set off by timers, and Egyptian TV also reported that the bombs were detonated remotely. Later investigations revealed the blasts were suicide attacks, set off by Bedouins, as in earlier attacks in the Sinai.

These explosions followed other bombings elsewhere in the Sinai Peninsula in previous years: in Sharm el-Sheikh on 23 July 2005 and in Taba on 6 October 2004.

Egyptian security officials have stated that the attacks were the work of an Islamic terror organisation called Jama'at al-Tawhīd wal-Jihad (Monotheism and Jihad).

=== 2008 Sudan kidnapping ===
In September 2008, a group of eleven European tourists and eight Egyptians were kidnapped during an adventure safari to one of the remotest sites in Egypt deep in the Sahara desert and taken to Sudan. They were subsequently released unharmed.

=== 2009 Khan el-Khalili bombing and February 2009 Cairo terrorist attacks ===
In February 2009, the Khan el-Khalili bombing killed a French schoolgirl on a class trip in Cairo. It is often discussed as the first of the February 2009 Cairo terrorist attacks.

=== 2009 Hezbollah plot ===
In April 2009, Egypt said it had uncovered a Hezbollah plot to attack tourist sites in the Sinai, causing tension with the Shia group from Lebanon.

== Attacks since 2010 ==
=== Al-Qidiseen church bombing (2011) ===
A car bomb explosion outside a church in the north Egyptian city of Alexandria killed at least 23 people and injured 43 following the evening service held at the church causing clashes between Coptic church members at the scene and the surrounding policemen. The attack saw governments around the world warn international travellers of the dangers of visiting the country, highlighting a likelihood of further terrorist attacks and possibility of kidnappings in Sinai.

On 23 January 2011, the Egyptian minister of interior Habib El Adli stated that Ahmed Lotfi Ibrahim Mohammed confessed to monitoring Christian and Jewish places of worship and sending pictures of the Qideseen church in Alexandria to the Army of Islam. He confessed that he had visited Gaza several times and was involved in planning the attack. British intelligence revealed that Muhammad Abd al-Hadi, leader of Jundullah, recruited Abdul Rahman Ahmed Ali who was told to park the car, which would be exploded by remote control.

=== Sinai insurgency (since 2011) ===
The Sinai insurgency comprises a series of actions by Islamist militants in the Sinai peninsula, initiated in early 2011 as a fallout of the 2011 Egyptian Revolution. The actions of those Islamist elements, largely composed of tribesmen among the local Bedouins, drew a harsh response from interim Egyptian government since mid-2011 known as Operation Eagle. However, attacks against government and foreign facilities in the area continued into 2012, resulting in a massive crackdown by the new Egyptian government nicknamed Operation Sinai. In May 2013, following an abduction of Egyptian officers, violence in the Sinai surged once again. Following the 2013 Egyptian coup d'état, which resulted in the ousting of Mohamed Morsi, "unprecedented clashes" have occurred.

=== 2014 attack on border guards ===
On 20 July 2014, at least 21 Egyptian soldiers were killed, and 4 injured in the Al-Wadi Al-Gedid attack when gunmen attacked a border checkpoint in the New Valley Governorate .

=== Terrorism in Egypt since 2013 transition ===
Since the 2013 military coup, more than 500 persons have been killed in a new wave of terrorism.

=== 2015 downing of Metrojet Flight 9268 ===
On 31 October 2015 Metrojet Flight 9268 mysteriously dropped out of the sky over the Sinai Peninsula killing all 224 passengers on board. It was an international chartered passenger flight, operated by Russian airline Kogalymavia (branded as Metrojet), following departure from Sharm el-Sheikh International Airport, Egypt, en route to Pulkovo Airport, Saint Petersburg, Russia. The aircraft, an Airbus A321-231, was carrying mostly tourists, there were 219 Russian, four Ukrainian, and one Belarusian. With its death toll of 224 people, the crash of Flight 9268 is the deadliest both in the history of Russian aviation and within Egyptian territory. It is also the deadliest air crash involving an aircraft from the Airbus A320 family, and the deadliest plane crash of 2015. IS has now several times claimed responsibility for the incident, and authorities from several countries now agree that the most plausible scenarios is bomb smuggled on board at the airport. Pictures are circulating on the internet showing internally caused ruptures. Many countries race to upgrade airport security measures over fears that IS plans more such attacks.

=== Church of Saints Peter & Paul bombing (2016) ===
On 11 December 2016, an explosion occurred next to the Saint Mark's Coptic Orthodox Cathedral complex in Cairo, at the Church of Saints Peter & Paul. The cathedral is the seat of the Coptic Orthodox Pope, in Cairo's Abbasia district. The explosion killed as many as 29 people, mostly women and children, and injured many more. The Islamic State claimed responsibility. President Abdel Fattah el-Sisi declared a national period of mourning for three days.

=== Red Sea resort attacks (2016–17) ===
On 8 January 2016, two suspected militants, armed with a melee weapon and a signal flare, allegedly arrived by sea and stormed the Bella Vista Hotel in the Red Sea city of Hurghada, stabbing two foreign tourists from Austria and one from Sweden. (Early reports incorrectly stated that the victims were one German and one Danish national.) One of the attackers, 21-year-old student Mohammed Hassan Mohammed Mahfouz, was killed by the security personnel. The other attacker was injured. The Islamic State claimed responsibility.

On 14 July 2017 Abdel-Rahman Shaaban, a former university student from the Nile Delta region, swam from a public beach to each of two resort hotel beaches at Hurghada on the Red Sea and stabbed five German and one Czech tourists, all women, killing two German women. One Czech tourist was in clinical death as of 26 July and died a day later in a hospital in Cairo. The perpetrator shouted that the Egyptian hotel personnel who gave pursuit after that stabbings at the second beach should "Stay back, I am not after Egyptians." Nevertheless, hotel personnel pursued and captured the attacker.

=== Palm Sunday 2017 church bombings ===
On Palm Sunday 9 April 2017, explosions occurred in St. George's Church in Tanta and St. Mark's Cathedral in Alexandria. 30 people were killed at St. George's and 17 at St. Mark's. The attacks were carried out by a security detachment of ISIS.

=== Minya Coptic Christian bus attack (2017) ===
On 26 May 2017, masked gunmen opened fire on a convoy carrying Egyptian Coptic Christians in Minya, Egypt, killing at least 28 and injuring 26. No group took immediate responsibility for the attack, although analysts suspected that ISIS was responsible.

=== Arish attack 2017 ===
On 24 November 2017, approximately 40 gunmen attacked the al-Rawda mosque near El-Arish Sinai during Friday prayers, killing 311 people and injured at least 122. While no group claimed responsibility for the attack, the Islamic State's Wilayat Sinai branch was strongly suspected. On 25 November, the Egyptian public prosecutor's office, citing interviews with survivors, said the attackers brandished the Islamic State flag. In an interview in the Islamic State magazine Rumiyah (January 2017 issue five) an insurgent Islamic State commander condemned Sufi practices and identified the district where the attack occurred as one of three areas where Sufis live in Sinai that Islamic State intended to "eradicate."

=== Saint Menas church attack 2017 ===
On 29 December 2017, in Helwan, Cairo, Egypt, a gunman opened fire at the Coptic Orthodox Church of Saint Menas and a nearby shop owned by a Coptic man, killing ten civilians and a police officer and injuring around ten people. He was wounded by police and arrested. Investigators said he had carried out several attacks in the last year. According to Amaq News Agency, the perpetrator of the attack belonged to the Islamic State group.

=== Bombing in Giza region (2018) ===
On 28 December 2018, three Vietnamese tourists and an Egyptian tour guide were killed after a roadside bomb struck a tourist bus in the Giza region near Cairo. At least 11 people were wounded. On 29 December, 40 alleged terrorists were killed by the Egyptian security personnel during raids in the Giza and North Sinai regions.

=== Cairo bombing (2019) ===
On 4 August 2019, at least 20 people were killed and 47 injured after a car, heavily loaded with a bomb, collided with other vehicles, causing an explosion outside National Cancer Institute in Cairo. The interior ministry stated that the car was on its way to a location, where the explosives were to be used to carry out a terrorist operation.

=== Giza shootout (2025) ===
On 20 July 2025, Egyptian police engaged in a shootout against members of the hasm movement, 2 of the militants were killed, one civilian was killed by stray fire during the shootout and one police officer was injured

== See also ==
- List of terrorist attacks
- Mohammed Atta
- Muhammad abd-al-Salam Faraj
- Terrorism and tourism in Egypt
- Timeline of terrorism in Egypt (2013–present)
