= 1986 Egyptian conscripts riot =

1986 mutiny in Cairo, Egypt

- Part of the Cold War and the Arab Cold War
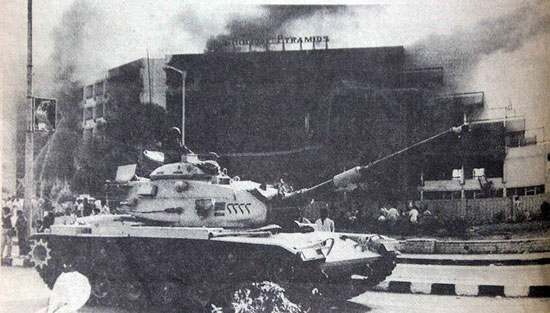
- Tanks in Cairo during the 1986 riots
| Date | 25 – 28 February 1986 |
| Location | Cairo, Egypt |
| Result | Government victory |

Belligerents
| Egypt: Egyptian Armed Forces; Egyptian Air Force | Central Security Forces |

Commanders and leaders
| (Egypt) Hosni Mubarak; Ahmed Shafik; Zaki Badr; Ahmed Rushdi | Safwat El-Sherif; Zakaria Azmi; Rifaat El-Mahgoub |

On 25 February 1986, around 25,000 conscripts of the Central Security Forces (CSF), a paramilitary force in Egypt, launched a mutiny in Cairo and the surrounding area. They staged violent protests as a reaction to the rumour that their three-year compulsory service would be prolonged by one additional year without any additional benefits or promotion in rank, targeting tourist areas, the United States Embassy Compound, and destroying two hotels.

The regime of Hosni Mubarak relied on the Egyptian Armed Forces to crush the ill-equipped CSF mutineers, and the military was sent in to restore order. The Egyptian Army deployed tanks, armoured personnel carriers and commando snipers against the rebelling conscripts, most of whom were unarmed or armed only with shields, batons, and assault rifles. The Egyptian Air Force and Army Aviation used Mil Mi-8 helicopters and Mig-21 fighter jets to attack the rebelling conscripts near Giza and in Upper Egypt. At least four to five helicopters, and three fighter jets, were used in the operation. The Air Force officer in command of the operation was Ahmed Shafik, as commander of all MiG-21 fleets in the Central Military Zone. The riot lasted for three days before it was suppressed.

According to official reports, the mutiny resulted in 107 deaths, mostly CSF personnel, with 1324 arrested. Over 20,000 conscripts were dismissed from service with no benefits, and the agitators received correctional punishment after being tried before State Security Court for arson, violent riots, and insubordination according to penal code. Some reports related that mutiny to a conspiracy against the Minister of Interior in charge by then, Ahmed Rushdi, due to his policies. The Mubarak government promised to overhaul the CSF by raising its entry standards, increasing payment and improving living conditions in their camps.

== Background ==
The Central Security Forces had ballooned in size, from 189 officers and 11,690 soldiers in 1969, to over 100,000 by the end of the 1970s, effectively an 'interior ministry-run army', used as a counterbalance against potential coups from other sectors, and to brutally suppress popular dissent. Conscripts were intentionally chosen from poor, rural areas, with low literacy or knowledge of political affairs preferred. Conscripts were mistreated by their officers, paid very little, ill-fed and frequently assaulted or even tortured. Thus the conditions were ripe for a mutiny, and the spread of rumors of an extra year's service indeed led to full-scale rebellion.

== See also ==
- Egyptian Revolution of 2011
- 1977 Egyptian bread riots
- List of modern conflicts in the Middle East
