= Yunis Makhyun =

Egyptian politician (born 1955)

Younes Makhioun

Chairman of Al-Nour Party
- Incumbent
- Assumed office 2013
- Preceded by: Emad Abdel Ghaffour

Personal details
- Born: 25 December 1955 (age 70) Abu Hummus, Beheira, Egypt
- Party: Nour Party
- Education: Alexandria University
- Profession: Dentist

Zakaria Younes Abdel-Halim Makioun (Arabic: زكريا يونس عبد الحليم مخيون) is an Egyptian MP who is currently the chairman of the Salafist Al-Nour Party. He was also a member of the Constituent Assembly of Egypt.

== Life ==
Younis Makyoun was elected to the People's Assembly of Egypt in the 2011-2012 election, representing Damanhour, Beheira. In February 2012 he proposed a blanket ban on Internet pornography, holding it responsible for the increase in divorce and rape statistics.

== Early life and education ==
Makhioun graduated from Alexandria University’s School of Dentistry and Oral Medicine in 1980, and also received a bachelor's in Islamic Sharia from Al-Azhar University in 1999.

== Political career ==
After the Egyptian revolution in January 2011 and the downfall of Hosni Mubarak's regime, many Islamic groups decided to establish political parties in Egypt.

The Salafi Call (Al-Da‘wa Al-Salafiyya) formed its own party which is the Al-Nour Party and Makhioum was one of the founding members of the new party in May 2011.

Makhioun was a parliament member as representing the Al-Nour Party after the 2011–12 Egyptian parliamentary election also a member of the constituent assembly which made the draft of the Egyptian current constitution: In March 2012, he became one of the 50 parliamentarians elected to the Constituent Assembly of Egypt, and kept his place in the Constituent Assembly when it was revamped in June 2012. In August 2012 he objected to the Egyptian government accepting an IMF loan, on the grounds that "Borrowing from abroad is usury". He has also clashed with liberals over press freedoms, demanding severe sentencing for libel and slander:

it is essential that journalists accused of libel and slander crimes face jail sentences, while in other offences — such as the crime of disseminating lies — it is enough for journalists and newspapers to face tremendous fines."

Makhioun was elected in January 2013 as president of the party after the resignation of Emad Abdel-Ghaffour. He, as chairman of al-Nour, was a visible representative of the party during the July 2013 coup against Mohamed Morsi. Initially supportive of the army's removal of Morsi on 3 July, Makhyoun announced al-Nour's withdrawal from the anti-Morsi coalition after the "massacre" on 8 July, in which dozens of Morsi supporters were killed.

Makhioun is known for his opposition to football, calling on Egyptians to stop watching the 2022 FIFA World Cup. In the same statement he called Lionel Messi an "enemy of Islam".

== Personal life ==
Dr. Makhyoun is married and he has 6 daughters and two sons.
