= Shukri Mustafa =

Egyptian Islamist

Shukri Mustafa (Arabic: شكري مصطفى, IPA: [ˈʃokɾi mosˈtˤɑfɑ]; 1 June 1942 – 19 March 1978) was an Egyptian agricultural engineer who led the extremist Islamist group Jama'at al-Muslimin, popularly known as Takfir wal-Hijra. He began his path toward Islamist thought by joining the Muslim Brotherhood in the 1960s. After being arrested for activities related to the group he became interested in the works of Sayyid Qutb and other radical thinkers. After being released in 1971, he gathered followers and withdrew from contemporary society. He was executed on March 19, 1978, after kidnapping and killing an Egyptian government minister and mainstream Muslim cleric, Muhammad al-Dhahabi. He was sentenced to death after a swiftly arranged military tribunal, alongside four other leaders.

== Early life ==
Shukri was born on 1 June 1942 in Abu Khors in Middle Egypt but moved with his mother at a young age to nearby Asyut. He attended an Islamic school and went on to study agriculture at Assiut University. It was here that he first came into contact with the Muslim Brotherhood, and he was arrested for distributing their pamphlets in 1965.

Shukri spent six years in prison, initially in Tura and then, from 1967, in Abu Zabal. While imprisoned, he read the recently executed Qutb's declarations that Egypt was in jahiliyyah (a state of pre-Islamic ignorance). Shukri and some of his fellow prisoners built on these ideas; they believed that most Egyptians were no longer truly Muslims, but had become apostates by their failure to struggle against the state. Shukri's faction, known as Jama'at al-Muslimin (Society of Muslims), additionally believed that Qutb had also called for total separation from jahiliyyah society.

Jama'at al-Muslimin fell apart following the Muslim Brotherhood's official rejection of Qutb's theories. The group's first leader, Sheikh Ali Abduh Ismail, renounced Takfir in 1969. Shukri was soon the leader by default: he was the only remaining member. He was released from prison in 1971 as part of the new president Anwar Sadat's rapprochement with the Muslim Brotherhood.

== Leadership of Jama'at al-Muslimin group ==
On his release, Shukri returned to Asyut where he finished his studies and began recruiting followers in the surrounding villages. In 1973, following the arrest of some of his followers, he took the group to live in caves in the nearby mountains, fully implementing his belief in withdrawal. He felt that his group was currently too weak to take action and so adopted a policy of separation. He hoped that this would protect the community from outside influences and allow it to grow in strength. By 1976 Shukri's followers numbered two thousand, mostly living in poor neighbourhoods of Cairo. They were known to the authorities but not considered a serious threat.

The members were forced to cut off contact with their families, bringing about several lawsuits from family members of women who joined. They felt Shukri was in essence seducing their daughters, or in some cases wives, and thus negating Egyptian views of family.

== Beliefs ==
Shukri took an extreme position. He regarded all previous scholarship as unnecessary and rejected even the four madh'habs (schools) of Islam. He insisted that each Muslim must engage in ijtihad (interpretation) based on the Qu'ran and the sunnah (practices of Muhammad and his followers).

Shukri rejected everything that he considered tainted by jahiliyyah society, including mosques—he instructed his followers not to attend Friday prayer in them. He claimed that, while some unaffiliated mosques were acceptable, the most appropriate place to pray was at home. He was indifferent to Egypt's "Anti-Zionist" struggle. When asked what he would do if Israel invaded Egypt, he responded that his group would flee rather than fight back. He considered the Egyptian Army his enemy just as much as Israel. He also believed that learning to write was useless for most Egyptians, and opposed it.

Unlike most similar groups, Jama'at al-Muslimin encouraged women to join. Shukri personally arranged marriages with male members and the group provided accommodation in shared lodgings. Often several couples would share a room, separated only by hanging curtains. If a married woman joined the group and her husband did not, then Shukri considered the "jahilliyah" marriage valueless and allowed her to wed again. This approach to marriage brought the group to public attention, with several media stories of family members claiming that their daughters had been stolen from them.

According to authors Daniel Benjamin and Steven Simon, based on the "testimony of those who knew him", and what Shuqri "intimated" during his trial, "it is clear Shuqri Mustafa thought he was the Mahdi", (the prophesied messiah of Islam who will return to Earth before the Day of Judgment and, (alongside Jesus), rid the world of wrongdoing, injustice and tyranny).

=== Confronting the state ===
In 1976 a few members left for other groups. Shukri reacted angrily. He declared them apostate and, in November, led two raids to kill them. The police intervened, detaining fourteen of his followers and issuing a warrant for Shukri's own arrest. Surprised by the official response, Shukri demanded their release but he was ignored by the Egyptian government and ridiculed by the press. It was at this point that his group was given the label "Takfir wal-Hijra" (Excommunication and Exile). Shukri hated the term, but it was far more descriptive than the group's chosen name and became fixed in the popular consciousness.

== Death ==
Shukri was frustrated by his inability to use his new media profile to promote his views and his leadership within the group was under question. His response was to kidnap a former Egyptian government minister and mainstream Muslim cleric, Muhammad al-Dhahabi, on 3 July 1977. Al-Dhahabi had previously produced an official pamphlet against the group, in which he linked them to Kharijism. Shukri demanded the release of his followers, apologies from the press and the printing of his literature. When these were ignored, the hostage was killed. The government's response was swift and decisive. Hundreds were arrested and dozens imprisoned. After a swiftly arranged military tribunal, Shukri and four other leaders were executed on 19 March 1978.

== See also ==
- Hassan al-Banna
- Muhammad abd-al-Salam Faraj
- Ayman al-Zawahiri
- Yusuf al-Qaradawi
- Zainab al Ghazali

== Sources ==
- Kepel, Giles. Jihad: The Trail of Political Islam pages 83–85.
- Kepel, Giles. Muslim extremism in Egypt: the Prophet and the Pharaoh
- Marc Sageman. Understanding terror networks
