= Al-Zawahiri (disambiguation) =

al-Zawahiri (Arabic: الظواهري, aẓ-Ẓawāhirī) is an Arabic surname or nisbah derived from name of the town of Zawahir, Saudi Arabia. The definite article "al-" is sometimes omitted. Alternate spellings include Dhawahiri, Dhawahri, and Zawahri.

== List of people with the surname ==
- Ayman al-Zawahiri (1951–2022), Egyptian al-Qaeda leader
- Hussein al-Zawahiri, Egyptian terror suspect captured and handed over to Egypt, younger brother of Ayman al-Zawahiri
- Muhammad al-Zawahiri (born 1953), terror suspect living in Egypt, Ayman al-Zawahiri's younger brother
- John Zawahri, the perpetrator of the 2013 Santa Monica shooting

== See also ==
- Al-Zahrawi 10th century Arab Andalusian surgeon, physician, chemist, Latinized as Abulcasis
