= Takfir wal-Hijra =

Radical Islamist group founded by Shukri Mustafa

- التكفير والهجرة
- Leader: Shukri Mustafa (executed)
- Dates active: 1971–present (as Jama'at al-Muslimin group until 1978, decentralised underground movement since)
- Ideology: Takfiri (Qutbism)
- Wars: Soviet–Afghan War; War on terror; Syrian Civil War; Sinai insurgency

Takfir wal-Hijra (Arabic: التكفير والهجرة, translation: "Excommunication and Exodus", alternatively "excommunication and emigration" or "anathema and exile"), was the popular name given to a radical Islamist group Jama'at al-Muslimin founded by Shukri Mustafa which emerged in Egypt in the 1960s as an offshoot of the Muslim Brotherhood. Although the group was crushed by Egyptian security forces after it murdered an Islamic scholar and former government minister in 1977, it is said to have "left an enduring legacy" taken up by some Islamist radicals in "subsequent years and decades."

== Name ==
The label "Takfir wal-Hijra" ("excommunication and exodus") was from the start a derogatory term used by the official Egyptian press media when talking about the cult group Jama'at al-Muslimin. The word takfir means to judge and label somebody (specifically one or more self-proclaimed Muslims, in this case contemporary Muslim society) to be a kafir (non-Muslim infidel). Hijra means flight or emigration or leaving, specifically the migration of the Islamic prophet Muhammad and his followers from Mecca where they were being persecuted, to the city of Medina. Thus, "Takfir wal-Hijra" referred to Muslims who judge mainstream Muslim society to be infidel, and see it as their duty to separate from it until such a time as they can return in strength to conquer and Islamicize it, as Muhammad did with Mecca.

Most Egyptians hesitated to use the title the group used for itself, Jama'at al-Muslimin meaning "Society of Muslims", as it implied that the group was the society of Muslims, and those not members were not part of Muslim society and not true Muslims. In addition, since few Egyptian Muslims (and no one in the government) agreed with the belief of the group's founder Shukri Mustafa that Muslims in Egypt deserved to be "excommunicated" (takfir) as un-Islamic, and that true Muslims were compelled to be in "exodus" (hijra), the cult's idea of "Takfir wal-Hijra" made it unique to most Egyptians. Consequently, "Takfir wal-Hijra" was the name given to the group by its detractors. Not surprisingly, Shukri and his followers strongly objected to being called that, but "Takfir wal-Hijra", and not Jama'at al-Muslimin, became fixed in the popular consciousness.

== Overview ==
Takfir wal-Hijra has been described as "a matrix of terrorist cells - allied to bin Laden but often more extreme than him," and as a group which inspired "some of the tactics and methods used by Al Qaeda and whose ideology is being embraced by a growing number of Salafist jihadists living in Europe." Described as a movement that began in Egypt in 1971, by the 1990s it has been described as a "decentralised network" of "cells", and as a "radical ideology" and "web of Islamic militants around the world connected only by their beliefs" (rather than "an organization per se"). The networks are said to be specializing in "logistical support to terrorist groups" operating across Europe that loosely follow a number of "core precepts", mainly that "man-made laws" are "illegitimate", that "theft, kidnapping, forced marriages and even the assassination of anyone who [is] not part of the group" are justified. Groups that have been described as Takfir wal-Hijra may have had little or no connection to each other.

The group has been said to form "the most extreme and violent strand in the Salafist jihadist movement." The takfir of the Takfiris refers to the belief (of at least some of the movement such as Ali Ismael, the sheikh of Egypt's Al-Azhar Mosque at the time) that not only were Egyptian President at the time Gamal Abdel Nasser and his government officials apostates, but so was "Egyptian society as a whole" because it was "not fighting the Egyptian government and had thus accepted rule by non-Muslims".

According to Mamoun Fandy, an Egyptian-born professor of politics and senior fellow at the Baker Institute of Public Policy, followers are allowed to shave their beards, drink alcohol, visit topless bars and commit crimes against Westerners — all under the cloak of subterfuge. "They are the mothers and fathers of sleeping cells." They believe that the ends justify any means and, that killing other Muslims can be justified in their cause and that Western society is heathen and it is their duty to destroy it.

== History and activities ==
The Jama'at al-Muslimin group was founded by Shukri Mustafa in 1971. Originally a member of the Muslim Brotherhood, Mustafa had been imprisoned with other members including Sayyid Qutb, and he eventually became one of Qutb's most radical disciples. Mustafa's group gained nationwide attention in Egypt when they kidnapped and eventually executed Islamic scholar and former government minister Husayn al-Dhahabi, a vocal critic of the group, in July 1977. In the crackdown that followed, 620 alleged members of the group were arrested and 465 tried before military courts. Shukri Mustafa was himself executed the next year, in March 1978. An apocalyptic group, according to authors Daniel Benjamin and Steven Simon, based on the "testimony of those who knew him" and Mustafa's statements during his trial, "it is clear Shuqri Mustafa thought he was the Mahdi". According to journalist Robin Wright, the group reorganized and within a year of Mustafa's death membership was estimated "to be as high as 4000."

Some former members of the group were later linked to the assassination of Anwar Sadat and the Asyut Islamic Uprising in 1981. According to Paul Wilkinson, Shukri Mustafa's execution "ushered in the emergence of two wings within Al Takfir: one under the leadership of Abbud al-Zammut (considered one of the original founders) and one under the leadership of Ayman Al-Zawahiri", later second in command of al-Qaeda. Takfir wal-Hijra grew substantially through the 1990s as "Afghan Arabs" returned from Afghanistan after fighting in the Soviet–Afghan War and Afghan Civil War (1989–1992) to their homes in the Middle East and North Africa and spread their doctrines, establishing a "decentralized network of believers" that has been active "throughout Algeria, Jordan, Lebanon, Libya, Morocco, Pakistan and Sudan". During the Algerian Civil War in the 1990s, the al-Muwahhidun group, which has otherwise been referred to as Takfir wal-Hijra, was central in the formation and the ideology of the Armed Islamic Group of Algeria (GIA) which went on to declare Algerian society "kuffar", commencing a campaign of massacring civilians.

Hayder Mili of Jamestown Foundation states that Takfir wal-Hijra has been responsible for "at least five attacks" on worshippers at mosques in Sudan from 1994 to 2006, resulting "in scores of fatalities and hundreds of injuries". Some news reports in which the name Takfir wal-Hijra have been mentioned include the killing of 16 Muslim worshipers in Sudan in 1994, and the killing of 22 people and wounding of 31 others who were praying at a Sudanese mosque six years later. In 1995, the Sudanese branch of the group planned to assassinate al-Qaeda-leader Osama bin Laden while he was residing in Sudan because his views were considered to be too liberal.

On 31 December 1999, in the Dinnieh district of Northern Lebanon "hundreds of Takfiris" led by Lebanese-American Bassam Kanj organised attacks killing civilians and clashing with the Lebanese Army, the biggest clashes since the civil war. The fighting lasted for a week before it was subdued. In 2005, Takfir wal‐Hijra took credit for the killings of Christian civilians in the same area in Lebanon. Lebanese-Canadian Kassem Daher who was arrested by Lebanese authorities in 2000 was accused of being a member of Takfir wal-Hijra.

Takfiris may have been involved in the murder of U.S. diplomat Laurence Foley in Jordan in 2002. The assassin of Dutch filmmaker Theo Van Gogh in 2004, Mohammed Bouyeri, left a note on Van Gogh's body containing references to Takfir wal-Hijra's ideology. Alleged members of Takfir wal-Hijra were arrested in Ukraine in 2009. In November 2013, Russian security forces detained 14 radical Islamists suspected of adhering to Takfir wal-Hijra.

The group has been involved in the Sinai insurgency since its beginnings in 2011. On 7 February 2011, RPG-wielding militants identified as members of Takfir wal-Hijra carried out an attack in Rafah, Egypt, leading to a two-hour battle with Egyptian security forces and local tribesmen in which two people were reported injured. In 2013, Egyptian police said they had arrested the leader of Takfir wal-Hijra as well as "dozens" of other militants.

== See also ==
- Terrorism in Egypt
- 2000 Jarafa mosque massacre
