= Salvation from hell =

Salvation from Hell
- جماعة الناجون من النار
- Ideology: Islamism

Salvation from Hell (Arabic: جماعة الناجون من النار, romanized: Al Najun Min Al Nar, lit. 'Saved from the Inferno') was a militant Islamic organization which operated in Egypt in the 1980s. It sought to establish an Islamic state in Egypt through the use of force.

During a 1989 trial in Egypt, 26 defendants were charged with forming Salvation from Hell, an illegal paramilitary organization, in addition to other charges. The Egyptian government broke off ties with Iran following allegations that Iran funded the group. Yasser Borhamy was detained for a month in 1987 due to his alleged connection with the assassination attempt against interior minister Hassan Abu Basha. Hussein al-Zawahiri, the brother of Ayman al-Zawahiri and Muhammad al-Zawahiri, was convicted for his alleged role in the assassination attempt. The group was also responsible for an assassination attempt on former interior minister Nabawi Ismail.

== See also ==
- Terrorism in Egypt
- Muslim Brotherhood in Egypt
- Al-Jama'a al-Islamiyya
- Egyptian Islamic Jihad

== Sources ==
- Egypt: Islamic Fundamentalist Organisations: The Muslim Brotherhood and the Gama'A Al-Islamiya (The Islamic Group) UNHCR
