= 1981 Asyut Islamist Uprising =

Islamist revolt in Egypt

- Part of Islamist Insurgency in Egypt
Date	October 8-9 1981
Location	Asyut, Egypt
Result	Egyptian Government victory

Belligerents
Egypt	al-Jama'a al-Islamiyya

Commanders and leaders
Hosni Mubarak	Assem Abdel Maged †

Strength
Several Hundred	75 - 100+ aided by several released prisoners

Casualties and losses
54-68 killed; 90+ wounded	6 killed; 4 wounded; Several Captured

The 1981 Asyut Uprising was a failed military operation conducted two days after the assassination of Anwar Sadat by militants of al-Gama'a al-Islamiyya. The attack on government targets in the city of Asyut, capital of the governorate of the same name, was the only of several operations which were intended to spark a popular uprising against the state. Although the attackers were able to inflict heavy casualties on security forces, they did not receive any significant popular support and were quickly crushed.

== Background ==
By the 1970s Egypt's rapidly increasing youth population was also becoming rapidly educated and politically organised. During the early days of Sadat's rule, Islamic student groups like Gama'a al-Islamiyya were covertly promoted as a counterweight to nationalist and leftist student organisations which opposed Sadat's policies of normalization of relations with Israel and Infitah (economic liberalization). Sadat's economic policies generally failed to provide job opportunities for graduates while simultaneously slashing subsidies and other state policies which benefited the poor. Meanwhile, a small westernised middle class enjoyed the bulk of the growth during Sadat's rule. Both of these factors contributed to a rise in popularity of Islamist politics which Sadat now began to repress as having marginalised the secular opposition, the Islamists now turned on Sadat. These actors created the environment in which Sadat's assassination was plotted and executed.

Asyut University had historically been a stronghold of Islamist student politics and as early as the late 1970s, members were conducting weapons training in the hills around the city, the arms likely provided by Aboud El Zomor. During this time, the city was also the site of several violent clashes between Islamists and local Copts. The university meanwhile, was the site of frequent clashes on between militant Muslims and police. The reported leader of the attack, Assem Abdel Maged, was a former engineering student who was expelled from Asyut University in October 1980.

According to residents of the town, officials turned down a request to hold a demonstration in honor of Eid Al Adha, which may have served as a possible motivation for the attackers and explain the timing of the operation, which coincided with the start of Eid.

== Attack ==
In the early morning of the 8th, following Fajr prayer a number of militants variously reported as between 75 and "hundred or more" commandeered 10 automobiles throughout the city. The attackers were organised into groups of 15 and armed with Kalashnikov rifles, submachineguns and pistols. The four targets of the attack were two police stations, the main security office, and a police unit guarding a mosque, with heavy casualties inflicted in the initial assault. At the security office the attackers were able to seize the building and released and armed prisoners from the jail. Fortifications were established around the security HQ, which the militants rallied around.

The attackers were able to repel several attempts by security forces, reinforced by Military Police and Commandos from the Army. Faced with mounting casualties, Interior Minister Nabawi Ismail asked for assistance from Defense Minister Gen. Abdel Halim Abu Ghazala. Two military jets were sent to flyover the occupied security building in the midafternoon and succeeded in convincing the insurgents to abandon the security HQ and regroup in a nearby vacant building which was used by various religious groups for their meetings. This building appeared to have been selected as a fallback position beforehand as it was found to be stocked with arms and ammunition.

After suffering casualties the insurgents retreated to a third building where they held out until nightfall, retreating into the working class districts that ringed the city center, Pursued by security forces, the insurgents fought running gunbattles throughout the night, with the last sustained fighting coming to an end at 6 AM on the ninth, when three insurgent snipers were killed. Isolated shots were fired throughout the morning, but ended by noon. Although no further clashes were reported, security forces continued to conduct operations to flush out escaped attackers for at least two weeks after the battle.

== Aftermath ==
In the immediate aftermath of the attack, the interior ministry reported 20 policemen as having been killed. Interior Minister Ismail invited reporters to see that city was under control and Foreign Minister Gen. Osama al-Baz, termed the Asyut clash "not serious" at a press briefing on Thursday night. Deputy Prime Minister Fouad Mohieddine pledged that the government was prepared to take "severe measures" to prevent any repeats of similar incidents. By Monday, Mayo, the weekly paper of the ruling National Democratic Party published a more detailed account of the attack, including a significantly higher number of government casualties. 58 policemen were reported dead, while other sources cite a total of 68 dead, forces from the ministries of the interior and defence combined. In the weeks after the attack, dozens of men were arrested, initially accused of belonging to Takfir Wahigra, an older militant Islamist organisation that was initially blamed for the attack and Sadat's assassination.

The attack revealed the political and military limitations of the Egyptian Islamists who were unable to mount attacks against any targets of real strategic value, and the naiveite of their belief that the Egyptian masses would revolt against the secular government if given a revolutionary spark. The attackers reportedly had planned for the uprising to have been larger in scale, expanding out from Asyut, but this did not come to pass due to heavy casualties and the failure of the Islamist prediction that the people would join them.

== See also ==
- Assassination of Anwar Sadat
