= Egyptian Intelligence Forces =

The Egyptian Intelligence Forces is a term used to refer to distinguished special units or teams in Egypt that belong to certain security or military agencies. These forces are tasked with special operations such as counterterrorism, protecting high-profile figures, and carrying out specialized missions. Among these units are:

- The “GIS” Force affiliated with the Egyptian General Intelligence Service.
- The “Black Cobra” Forces under the Ministry of Interior, considered among the elite units assigned to high-risk and rapid-response missions.

== Duties and responsibilities ==
- Protecting and securing official figures and providing personal protection during movements.
- Conducting specialized counterterrorism operations and coordinating with specialized units to capture wanted individuals, such as the operation to retrieve Hesham Ashmawy from Libya.
- Rapid interventions in emergency situations and reconnaissance in front-line areas.

== Training and capabilities ==
The Egyptian Elite Forces are known for their endurance in combat for several consecutive days and their high precision in shooting. It is also noted that the “Black Cobra” undergoes specialized training and is equipped for missions in various environments, including mountains, deserts, and border regions.

== See also ==
- National Security Agency (Egypt)
- El Saa'qa Forces
- General Intelligence Service (Egypt)
