= Al-Nour Party =

Egyptian political party

Al-Nour Party حزب النور
- Chairperson: Yunis Makhyun
- Founders: Emad Abdel Ghaffour; Yasser Borhamy
- Founded: 12 May 2011
- Headquarters: 601 Horrya Way, Zezenia, Alexandria
- Newspaper: The New Light
- Ideology: Religious conservatism Salafism; Sunni Islamism
- Political position: Right-wing to far-right
- Colours: Blue, red, white
- Slogan: Identity and Modern state (Arabic: هوية و دولة عصرية)
- House of Representatives: 6 / 596

Website
- www.alnourpartyeg.com

The al‑Nour Party (Arabic: حزب النور, romanized: Ḥizb an-Nūr), or "Party of The Light", is one of the political parties created in Egypt after the 2011 Egyptian Revolution. It has an ultra-conservative, Islamist ideology, which believes in implementing strict Sharia law. It has been described as the political arm of the Salafi Call Society, and "by far the most prominent" of the several new Salafi parties in Egypt, which it has surpassed by virtue of its "long organizational and administrative experience" and "charismatic leaders".

In the 2011–12 Egypt parliamentary elections, the Islamist Bloc led by al‑Nour party received 7,534,266 votes out of a total 27,065,135 correct votes (27.8%). The Islamist Bloc, of which al-Nour was a member, gained 127 of the 498 parliamentary seats contested, second-place after the Muslim Brotherhood's Freedom and Justice Party. Al‑Nour Party itself won 111 of the Bloc's 127 seats.

In December 2012/January 2013, a new Watan party led by Emad Abdel Ghaffour splintered off from Al-Nour. From January 2013 the party gradually distanced itself from President Mohamed Morsi's Brotherhood government, and came to support the military's July 2013 coup which overthrew Morsi.

By 2020, its support had badly eroded and in September of that year, Al-Nour failed to win any seats in the Egyptian Senate election.

== History ==
"For decades" before the 2011 Egyptian revolution, Salafists "stayed away" from politics and focused on "religion and inviting people for prayer".

=== 2011 Revolution ===
Al‑Nour was set up after the revolution, when the interim military government allowed the formation of new parties, and legally recognized on 13 June.

It was established by one of the largest Salafist groups in Egypt, the Salafist Call (Al-Da'wa Al-Salafiyya), also known as the Al-Dawaa movement. (The Salafi philosophical movement has been associated with literalist, strict and puritanical approaches to Islam.) The Salafi Call group started in the 1970s and was firmly established in the 1980s in Alexandria University after students refused to join the Muslim Brotherhood, leading to clashes that impelled the Salafis to institutionalize their activities within the city.

The Salafis in the past had refused to take part in politics because they believed that the political system that existed at the time was un-Islamic, though they were concerned with politics from an Islamic point of view relating to daily Egyptian life. During the revolution, they did not support the uprising because "the Americans would have ordered Mubarak to massacre them all", according to a party spokesman.

After the revolution, the Salafis decided to take part in politics in order to protect the Islamic identity of Egypt, based on the fundamentals of Islam, the Quran and Sunnah. Leading Salafi preacher Yasser Borhamy began to engage in politics after Mubarak's ouster, saying "Islam must become involved of all aspects of life, even the political, and the Islamic movement must unite". According to analyst Muneer Adeeb, Islamists in Egypt had "their political heyday after the 2011 revolution because they were the most organized political force then." But issues important to Salafists—such as whether antiquities (pyramids, etc.) should be destroyed, the subordination of women and non-Muslims—were later to prove problematic in contemporary politics.

=== 2011-2012 elections ===
Al‑Nour was recognised as an official party after it had obtained its license in June 2011, led by Emad Abdel Ghaffour.

The party was initially a member of the Democratic Alliance for Egypt, but it withdrew in September 2011. The Authenticity Party also left the Democratic Alliance for Egypt and formed a separate alliance with Al-Nour. The Building and Development Party also joined the alliance and it was publicly announced as the Islamist Bloc in November 2011.

The Salafi Al‑Nour reportedly did well in the parliamentary election, winning 111 seats, in part because of loyalty it won from voters with the many Salafi-sponsored charitable activities: help for the sick and the poor; financial assistance to widows, divorcées, and young women in need of marriage trousseaus; and abundant religious instruction.

In the 2012 presidential election, Hazem Salah Abu Ismail, who, while not officially affiliated with the party, was considered to be the candidate of the Salafi movement, was disqualified to run. Without any clear Salafi candidate, the al-Nour Party settled on moderate Islamist Abdel Moneim Aboul Fotouh on 28 April 2012. However, the party declared its support for Muslim Brotherhood candidate Mohamed Morsi in the second and final election round between Morsi and Ahmed Shafik, the last prime minister appointed by Mubarak.

=== Party split ===
However, in September 2012, Ghaffour was suspended from the party, and elections for a new party leader were expected soon after. He was reinstated as the head of the party following a 10-hour meeting by the party in early October 2012. Ghaffour resigned as party chairman on 29 December 2012 and in January 2013 formed the rival Watan Party.

=== 2012–2013 Egyptian protests ===
Although initially a political ally of the MB's Freedom and Justice Party, the al-Nour Party soon came to join the mainly secular opposition, and were an active force in the 2012–13 Egyptian protests that resulted in the 2013 Egyptian coup d'état and consequent ouster of President Morsi.

Following what al-Nour described as a "massacre" on the dawn of 8 July, when pro-Morsi demonstrators were attacked and at least 54 were left dead, al-Nour in protest withdrew from talks to choose an interim prime minister. Nevertheless, al-Nour has not expressed support for the return of Mohamed Morsi to power. The party has advised the interim government on ministerial candidates. The al-Nour Party has supported the draft constitution that will be voted on in the 2014 constitutional referendum.

=== Lawsuit against Islamic parties ===
The al-Nour Party is one of the eleven Islamic parties targeted by a lawsuit in November 2014, when an organization named Popular Front for opposing the Brotherhoodization of Egypt sought to dissolve all political parties established "on a religious basis."

A lawsuit against the party was dismissed on 22 September 2014 because the court indicated it had no jurisdiction. The Alexandria Urgent Matters Court however ruled on 26 November 2014 that it lacked jurisdiction.

A case on the dissolution of the party was adjourned until 17 January 2015 and further postponed until 21 February 2015. Another court case that was brought forth to dissolve the party was dismissed after the Alexandria Urgent Matters Court ruled on 26 November 2014 that it lacked jurisdiction. A lawsuit was rejected by the Parties Court and referred back to a lower court because the only entity qualified to argue for the dissolution of a party is the leader of the political parties commission.

=== Post-Morsi coup political decline ===
After the overthrow of Muslim Brotherhood president Mohammad Morsi, Salafi parties supported the regime of President Abdel Fattah al-Sisi who in turn courted them, despite the hard line he generally took against political Islam. But in the 2015 House of Deputies elections, Al-Nour won only 12 seats out of a total of 596, and in the September 2020 parliamentary elections, Al-Nour failed to win any seats in the Egyptian Senate, (they won 45 seats in the Senate elections of January 2012). Some of the reasons given for the party's poor performance were the closure of mosques (a common gathering place and "the main sphere of activity for the Salafists") due to Covid, "hostile propaganda" from their cousin Islamists, the Muslim Brotherhood, anger over Salafist cooperation with Sisi, and very low voter turnout in the first election (14%) and runoff (10.25%). Political scientist Akram Badreddine of Cairo University notes also a general decline in voter support for "political parties with religious backgrounds".

The party won six seats in the 2025 Egyptian parliamentary election.

== Electoral history ==
=== People's Assembly of Egypt elections ===
Election	Party leader	Votes	%	Seats	+/–
2011–2012	Emad Abdel Ghaffour	7,534,266	27.8% as part of Islamist Bloc	107 / 508	▲107

=== Shura Council elections ===
Election	Party leader	Votes	Seats	+/–
2012	Emad Abdel Ghaffour	1,840,014	45 / 180	▲45

=== House of Representatives elections ===
Election	Party leader	Votes	%	Seats	+/–
2015	Yunis Makhyun			11 / 596	▲11
2020	Yunis Makhyun			7 / 596	▼4
2025	Yunis Makhyun			6 / 596	▼1

=== Senate elections ===
Election	Party leader	Votes	Seats	+/–
2020	Yunis Makhyun		2 / 300	▲
2025	Yunis Makhyun		2 / 300	Steady

== Political orientation ==
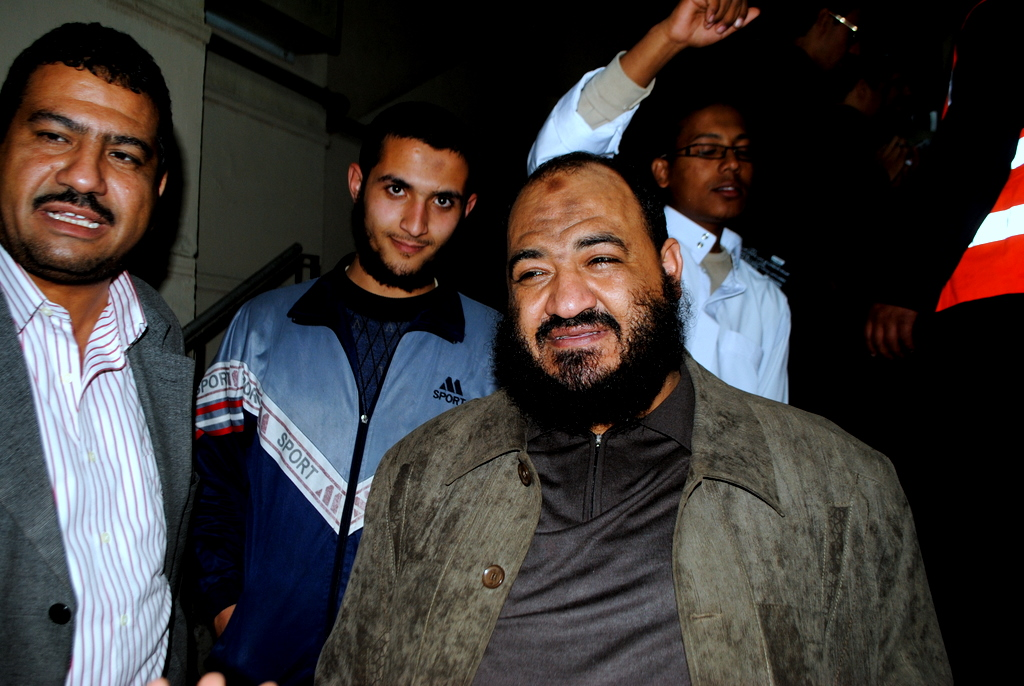
Abdel Moneim El Shahat, one of the leaders of the Al-Nour Party

Al‑Nour Party is an ultra-conservative Islamist party maintaining a strict version of Islam, known as the Salafi methodology. Salafis believe in practising Islam as it was practiced by the Islamic prophet Muhammad, his companions, and the later generations. Their main source of governance is strictly based on the Quran and the Sunnah.

Its political aim is to establish a theocratic state on the lines of Wahhabism like in Saudi Arabia. Saudi Arabia was found to be the main financer of the party according to the public German television news service ARD.

=== Religion ===
The religious foundation and structure of al-Nour party is based almost entirely on the Salafi interpretation of Islam.

Al-Nour believes the principles of Islamic Sharia should be the main source of legislation. However, the party promises that it will allow Christians to have their own separate laws for their internal matters.

=== Israeli–Palestinian conflict ===
The party has stated it is committed to the 1979 Egypt–Israel peace treaty as a binding international agreement and would be willing to hold negotiations with Israel.

At the same time, al‑Nour said it seeks amendments to the agreement and opposes normalization with Israel. Specifically, an al‑Nour spokesman stated, "We call for full Sinai rights for Egypt and for our brothers in Palestine and occupied lands, and we see this as directly related to the agreement." Regarding normalization, an al‑Nour statement read, "The party strongly objects normalization and dialogue attempts and establishing relations with an entity [Israel] which wants to wipe off our identity, occupies our lands, imposes a siege on our brothers and strongly supports our hangers."

=== Perspective on loans ===
Al‑Nour Party had stated in September 2012 that it would not oppose a loan from the International Monetary Fund to the Egyptian government, although Islamic law bans the paying of interest. The party argued that the loan is vital to Egypt's economy in the current period and that there is no other alternative, citing the Islamic saying "Necessities permit what is banned".

However, the party had changed opinion in February 2013, saying the IMF loan agreement requires an approval from a body of senior scholars at Al-Azhar University.

The party's members suggested other alternatives to foreign borrowing such as reforming subsidy system, dispensing with highly paid advisers and offering Sukuk (financial certificates) that Islamic financing experts claim will attract billions of pounds to the country.

== Notable people ==
- Galal al-Morra

== See also ==
- List of Islamic political parties
- List of political parties in Egypt
