= Atef Sedki Cabinet =

The Atef Sedki governed Egypt through three cabinets under president Hosni Mubarak between 1986 and 1996.

== List of members ==
Office	Incumbent	Duration
Prime Minister	Atef Sedki	1986–1996
Deputy Prime Minister; Minister of Planning; Minister of International Cooperation	Kamal Ganzouri	n/a
Deputy Prime Minister	Ahmed Asmat Abdel-Meguid	?
Minister of Domestic Development	Atef Ebeid	n/a
Minister of Defence and Military Production	Abd al-Halim Abu Ghazala (1982–1989); Youssef Sabri Abu Taleb (1989–1991); Mohamed Hussein Tantawi (appointed 1991)	
Minister of Culture	Farouk Hosny	appointed 1987
Minister of Agriculture and Land Reclamation	Yousef Wali	1982
Minister of Foreign Affairs	Ahmed Asmat Abdel-Meguid (1984–1991); Amr Moussa(1991–)	n/a
Minister of Petroleum and Mineral Resources	Hamdi Al Banbi	appointed 1991
Minister of Information	Safwat El-Sherif	1982
Minister of Education	Hussein Kamel Bahaeddin	1992
Minister of Economy and Foreign Trade	Youssri Mustafa	1986
Minister of Finance	Mohammed Ahmed Razaz	1986
Minister of the Interior	Zaki Badr (1986–1990); Abdul Halim Moussa (1990)	?
Minister of Electricity	Mohamed Maher Abaza	1984
Minister of Tourism	Mohammed Mamdouh El-Beltagui	1993
Justice Minister	Farouk Seif Al Nasr	1990
Minister for the Shura Council	Kamal Mohammed El-Shazli	October 1993
Housing, Utilities, and Urban Communities	Mohammed Ibrahim Suleiman	October 1993
Manpower and Emigration Minister	Ahmad Ahmad El-Amawy	1993
Minister of State for Administrative Development	Mohamed Zaki Abu Amer	1993
Minister of State for the Council of Ministers and Minister for International Cooperation	Youssef Boutros Ghali	1993
