= 2014 Chaambi Mountains attack =

Skirmish in Tunisia

- Part of the Chaambi Operations
- Location: Chaambi Mountains, Tunisia
- Date: 16 July 2014
- Target: Tunisian Armed Forces
- Attack type: Mass shooting
- Weapons: Automatic rifles, rocket-propelled grenades
- Deaths: 15 soldiers 1 militant
- Injuries: 25
- Perpetrator: Uqba Ibn Nafi Battalion

On 16 July 2014, militants from the Uqba Ibn Nafi Battalion attacked two checkpoints in the Chaambi Mountains killing fourteen Tunisian soldiers and injuring twenty-five. The 2014 Chaambi Mountains attack is the deadliest militant skirmish involving the Tunisian Armed Forces since their independence in 1956.

== Background ==
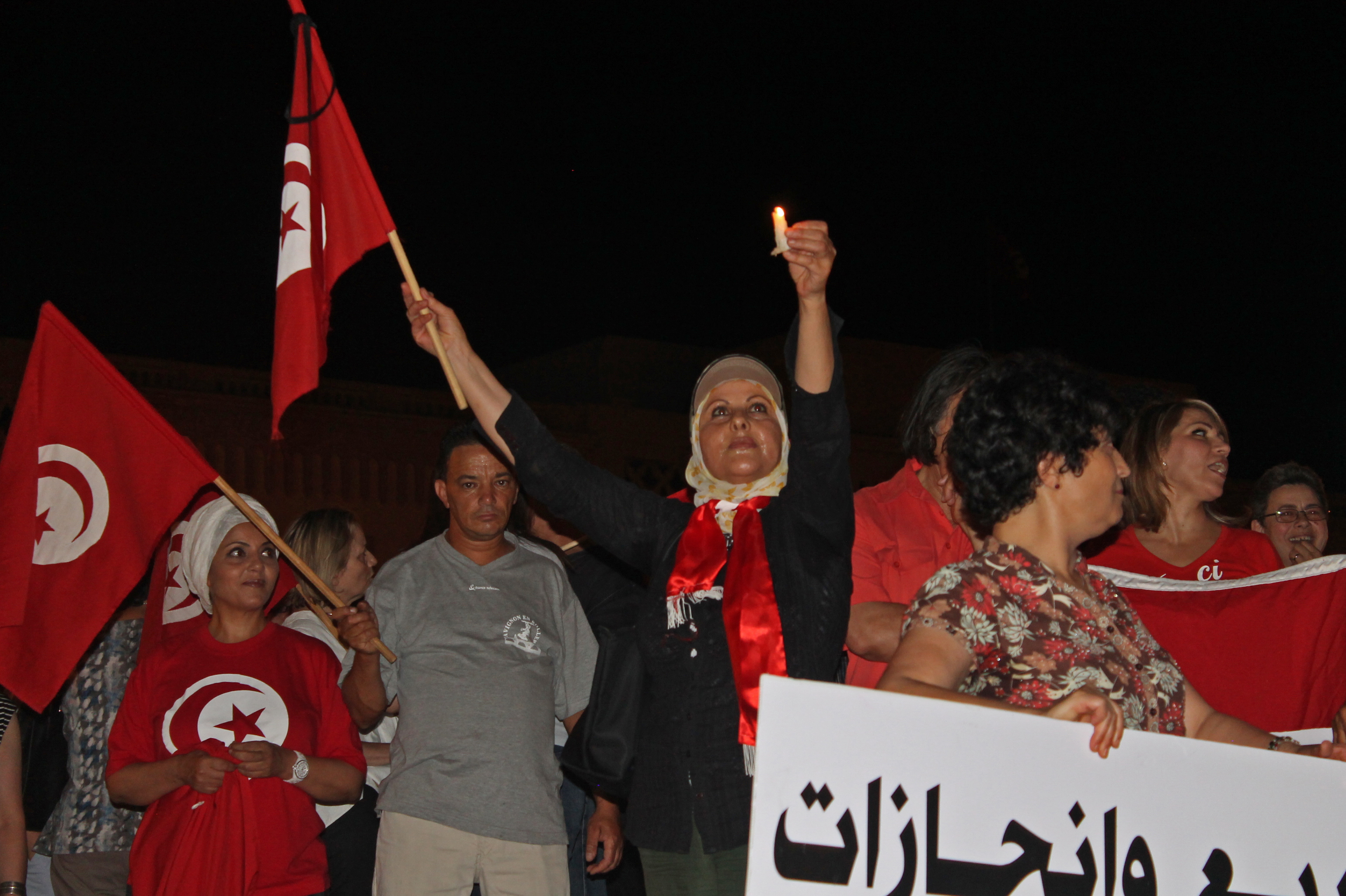
Activists organize a candlelight protest in Tunis on 3 July 2014, to denounce terrorism and insecurity.

Since the 2011 uprising that led to the ousting of former president Zine El Abidine Ben Ali, Tunisia has faced an unprecedented rise in radical Islamism, with hardline fundamentalists became more influential. Islamist militants have been increasingly present around the porous border with Algeria. The previous year, some of them were able to capture and execute eight Tunisian soldiers. Government forces have been battling militants in the Chaambi Mountains region since early 2013 and it was declared a "closed military zone".

== Attack ==
The attacks happened during the evening while the soldiers were breaking their fast to eat during Ramadan. At 7:40 p.m., 60 militants divided in two groups simultaneously ambushed two checkpoints which were set up by the military to control the Chaambi Mountains region. The militants shot from many angles using rifles and rocket-propelled grenades. Five soldiers died of their wounds and nine burned to death when their tent caught fire. Twenty others were injured and the wounded were taken to a hospital in Kasserine. Another soldier went missing but his body was found the next day around a kilometer from the site of the initial clashes, raising the death toll to 15.

Tunisia's Defense Minister Ghazi Jeribi said that the attackers infiltrated the region from the borders with Algeria and that the assailants included Tunisians, Algerians and "foreign mercenaries". One of them was killed and was identified as a Tunisian jihadist.

== Reactions ==
=== Domestic ===
President Moncef Marzouki announced a three-day period of mourning for the country and ordered flags to be flown at half mast. Prime Minister Mehdi Jomaa condemned the attacks and vowed they would not go unpunished. He said that they gave a bad image to an "open and tolerant Tunisia" and were aimed at obstructing the country's democratic process. Jomaa announced a crackdown on terrorism by strengthening of border control and all networks recruiting fighters for jihad in other countries, most notably Syria. Land forces chief, Maj. Gen. Souhail Chmangi said that this is a state of "open warfare".

The incident also drew condemnation by most of Tunisia's political movements. Many criticized the government for its failure to prevent such attack and the National Constituent Assembly (NCA) for not drafting a law that would equip the country well enough to fight the threat of terrorism. As a result, members of the NCA held a debate the following day. where fifteen articles of the draft counter-terrorism law were ratified. "People accuse the NCA of procrastination in drafting the terrorism law, and we are not,” said Kalthoum Badr Eddine, the commission's president.

Béji Caïd Essebsi, leader of Nidaa Tounes, delivered a statement following the attacks. "The war against terrorism requires a strong, national political union which contrasts with the previously adopted strategies driven primarily by laxity and procrastination," he said. Popular Front spokesman Hamma Hammami said that Tunisia is "now paying the price for ideological, [...] political, and legislative laxity". Some Islamist groups also condemned the attacks. Ridha Belhaj, spokesman of Hizb ut-Tahrir, said: "We consider this attack to be criminal and treacherous. What is more dangerous than the act itself is its timing. [...] Every time there is a political crisis, a similar incident occurs". On its Facebook page, Ennahdha called on political forces, national organizations, and all supporters of freedom in Tunisia to participate in a march after Friday prayers the next day.

=== International ===
- Egypt - Egypt denounced the terrorist attacks through a statement by the Foreign Ministry spokesman Badr Abdel-Atti. He said that "terrorism is a global phenomenon and not related to a specific religion or nation," adding that it is important to rally regional and international efforts to confront its threat.
- France – The French government condemned the attack and the Foreign Affairs Ministry spokesman Romain Nadal reiterated his country's support to the Tunisian government in its fight against terrorism. "We express our condolences to the families of the victims," he added.
- Jordan - King Abdullah II phoned both Tunisia and Egypt's presidents, due to a similar attack in Egypt two days later, offering them his condolences and condemning "such cowardly terrorist acts". He also expressed his solidarity with Egypt and Tunisia, as well as the families of the victims.
- Turkey – Turkish Foreign Ministry strongly condemned the terrorist attack in Tunisia. The statement said: "We strongly condemn the terrorist attack perpetrated in Tunisia and causing the death of 15 soldiers and the injury of 20. Turkey will continue to be in solidarity with the friendly and brotherly people of Tunisia."
- United States – The United States Department of State released a statement condemning the attack: "The United States strongly condemns last evening’s terrorist attack". "We extend our condolences to the families of the victims, and hope for the quick and full recovery of the wounded," the statement added.
