= Adil Awad Siyam =

Alleged former military chief of al-Jihad

An alleged former military chief of al-Jihad, Adil Awad Siyam (عادل عوض) (kunya: Abu al-Nadr) was killed by police in an April 1994 operation in Giza, Egypt.

== Alleged actions ==
Known to carry a Yemeni passport and referred to as the "ghost man", Siyam was accused of overseeing a failed attempt to kill the warden of Turah prison, as well as Interior Minister Hasan al-Alfi. He was also involved in one of the plots to assassinate Hosni Mubarak.

== Death ==
On April 9, Egyptian General Raouf Khairat was assassinated in Cairo, leading to retaliatory raids against suspected militants.

Siyam's death was alternately reported to have occurred on April 4, before the General was even killed, or on April 21, eight days after his own death was announced by Interior Minister al-Alfi.

A cache of explosives and small arms was said to have been seized in the raid.

== Aftermath ==
Siyam had a daughter who in turn married Isam Muhammad Khalil.
