= Salafist Call =

Salafi organization in Egypt that was established in 1984

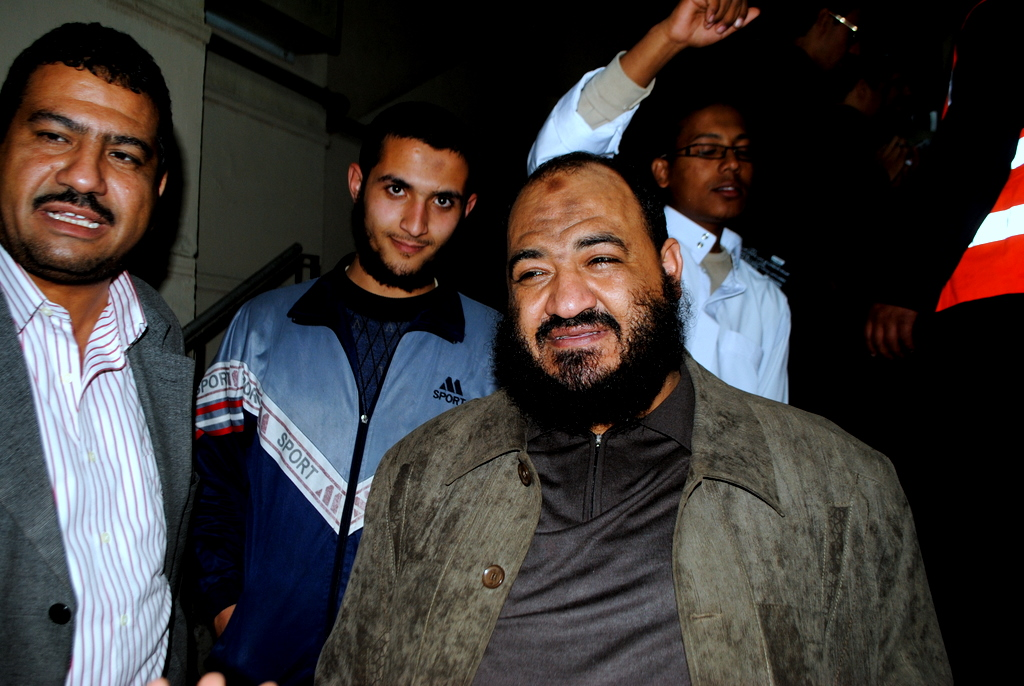
Salafist Leader Abdel Moneim El Shahat near Tahrir Square

The Salafist Call (Arabic: الدعوة السلفية or Ad-Da'wa As-Salafiya) is a Salafi organization in Egypt that was established in 1984. It established the Nour Party in 2011, which won the second-highest number of seats in the 2011–2012 Egyptian parliamentary election. Yasser Borhamy is the vice president of the organization, while Mohamed Abdel Fattah Abu Idris is the president.
