= Farouk Seif Al Nasr =

Egyptian politician (1922–2009)

Minister of Justice
- In office October 1987 – July 2004
- President: Hosni Mobarak
- Prime Minister: Atef Sedki; Kamal Ganzouri; Atef Ebeid
- Succeeded by: Mahmoud Abul Leil

Personal details
- Born: 14 December 1922
- Died: 31 December 2009 (aged 87)
- Children: 3

Farouk Seif Al Nasr (14 December 1922 – 31 December 2009) was an Egyptian politician who served as justice minister in different cabinets during Husni Mobarak's presidency.

== Early life and education ==
Nasr was born on 14 December 1922. He received a bachelor's degree in law.

== Career ==
Nasr was an advisor to the Libyan government. Then he worked as a technical advisor to the Egyptian justice ministry in 1972. He was named as head of the supreme constitutional court in 1982. He served as justice minister in Egypt, the post which he had been appointed in October 1987. The cabinet was headed by Prime Minister Atef Sedki. Nasr was also appointed to the same post in the cabinet led by Prime Minister Atef Ebeid in October 1999. As of 2003 Nasr was the president of the Asian-African Legal Consultative Organization. Nasr was removed from office as justice minister, and Mahmoud Abul Leil replaced him in the post on 12 July 2004 when the cabinet of Ahmed Nazif was formed. During his tenure as justice minister Nasr was a member of the Political Parties Committee which oversaw the legal procedures about the establishment of new political parties in the country.

== Personal life ==
Nasr was married and had three children. He died in December 2009 at the age of 87.
