= Galal al-Morra =

Egyptian Islamist politician

Galal al-Morra is an Egyptian Islamist politician, secretary-general of the Salafi Al-Nour Party.

Galal Morra was appointed secretary-general of Al-Nour on 16 January 2013.

He was one of the politicians flanking General Abdul-Fattah el-Sisi when he announced the removal of Mohamed Morsi in the 2013 Egyptian coup.
