= 2000 Jarafa mosque massacre =

Shooting attack in Omdurman, Sudan

Coordinates: 15°39′N 32°29′E

- Part of Second Sudanese Civil War
- Omdurman (Sudan)
- Location: Al-Jarafa, Omdurman, Sudan
- Date: 8 December 2000 c. 21:00 (CAT)
- Attack type: Mass murder, massacre
- Weapon: Zastava M70AB2 assault rifle
- Deaths: 22–27
- Injuries: 31
- Assailant: Abbas al-Baqir Abbas
- Motive: Sectarian violence by Takfir wal-Hijra against Ansar al-Sunna

On 8 December 2000, a mass shooting took place at Al-Sunna Al-Mohammediyya Mosque in the al-Jarafa neighborhood of Omdurman, Sudan. A member of Takfir wal-Hijra opened fire during Isha prayer attended by members of Ansar al-Sunna, killing at least 22 people and injuring more than 30 others before the gunman was killed by police.

== Background ==
Takfir wal-Hijra is a Qutbi Islamist extremist group, originating in Egypt, that had a history of differences with the pacifist Ansar al-Sunna. While the former believes the Sharia should be implemented by force, the latter does not. This conflict has resulted in similar incidents previously. On 4 February 1994, three assailants, Mohammed Abdullah al-Khilaifi, a Libyan Islamist, along with two Sudanese, attacked a mosque of Ansar al-Sunna in Al Thawra with assault rifles, killing 19 people and injuring 15. Al-Khilaifi was later sentenced to death and executed on 19 September 1994.

On 1 January 1996, eight assailants and a police officer were killed in a fight between members of the group and police in Kambo Ashara when the former tried to force villagers to convert. An attack on the same mosque in Jarafa in 1996 left 12 people dead. On 1 November 1997, two members of Takfir wal-Hijra attacked people leaving a mosque in Arkawit with knives, killing two and wounding a further ten.

== Shooting ==
At about 9:00 p.m., Abbas Abbas began shooting through a window of the mosque, killing around 20 worshipers. According to witnesses, he avoided the women's section of the mosque and reassured a fleeing woman that he would only shoot males. When he refused to surrender to responding police units, Abbas was killed after a brief shootout with officers. Thirty-three were wounded in the attack, among them a police officer. At least two of the injured later died of their wounds.

Although Abbas acted alone, according to police, witnesses stated that shots were fired from three directions and that there had been at least three attackers dressed in jellabiyas, all but one fleeing before police arrived. There were also reports that not only worshippers at the mosque were attacked, but that the gunman killed at least two boys in the village. Various higher death tolls were reported, ranging from 23 and 24 to 27 people killed and 49 wounded.

== Perpetrator ==
Abbas al-Baqir Abbas

Abbas al-Baqir Abbas (Arabic: عباس الباقر عباس) was 33 years old and from Al-Dasis in the northern part of Al Jazirah. It was reported that his mother had left their home due to his religious fanaticism and that he beat his sister, accusing her of infidelity. He studied economics at Tripoli University, but was forced to leave Libya because of leading Islamist groups and thus threatening security. He was a former member of the Popular Defence Forces, fighting rebels in the southern part of Sudan.

Initially being a member of Ansar al-Sunna, Abbas left due to religious differences and joined Takfir wal-Hijra. It was said that he had repeatedly threatened members of Ansar al-Sunna with an attack similar to the one in 1994. Because of these threats, he was arrested in 1998 for four months, and again a few months prior to the shooting, along with 20 other people suspected of being members of Takfir wal-Hijra. However, he repented and claimed to have abandoned the group and its ideas, and as a result, he was released.

== Aftermath ==
The following day, President Omar al-Bashir visited the mosque, paying his condolences to relatives of the victims and assured that a legislation would be passed to control fanatical religious groups, vowing "to rectify laws in order to protect society from destructive and harmful ideas.". In the wake of the massacre, police and security forces were deployed in Khartoum State in a large scale inspection campaign to prevent further violence, leading to the arresting of 65 leading members of Takfir wal-Hijra and security laws were tightened, allowing law enforcement to detain suspects for up to six months. The amendments were criticized by opposition parties for curtailing liberties and they accused President Bashir of abusing the incident to increase his power.
