= Emad Abdel Ghaffour =

Egyptian politician

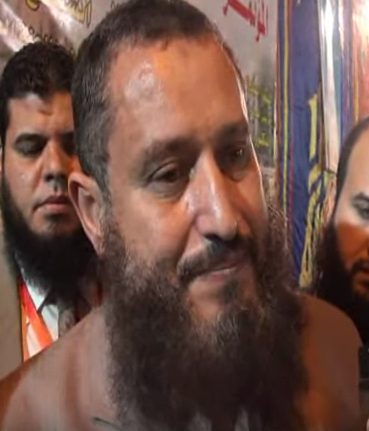

Personal details
- Born: Egypt
- Party: Homeland Party
- Other political affiliations: Al-Nour Party

Emad Eddine Abdel-Ghaffour (Arabic: عماد الدين عبد الغفور) is a founder of the Salafist Homeland Party in Egypt, the former leader of the Al Nour Party and a surgeon. He was released from detention 2 weeks after the 2013 Egyptian coup. Ghaffour stated at the time that he would withdraw from politics and focus on worship, given the political climate. Ghaffour was instrumental in the creation of the new alliance named the 25 January Salvation Front that calls for the "restoration" of the 25 January revolution; Ghaffour met with Abdel Moneim Aboul Fotouh to organize its creation.
