= Yasser Borhamy =

Egyptian activist and preacher

Yasser Borhamy ياسر برهامي

Personal life
- Born: 9 September 1958 (age 67) Alexandria, Egypt
- Occupation: Islamic activist preacher Doctor

Religious life
- Religion: Islam
- Movement: Wahhabism

Yasser Borhamy is an Egyptian Salafi Muslim activist and preacher. He is one of the founders of the Salafist Call, a movement that created the Salafist Al Nour Party in 2011. He is also the vice president of the Salafist Call. Borhamy was detained for a month in 1987 due to his alleged connection with the assassination attempt against interior minister Hassan Abu Basha by the group Salvation from Hell.

== See also ==
- Muhammad Hussein Yacoub
