= 'Abd al-Mun'im al-Shahhat =

Egyptian religious preacher and TV Host

'Abd al-Mun'im al-Shahhat عبد المنعم الشحات
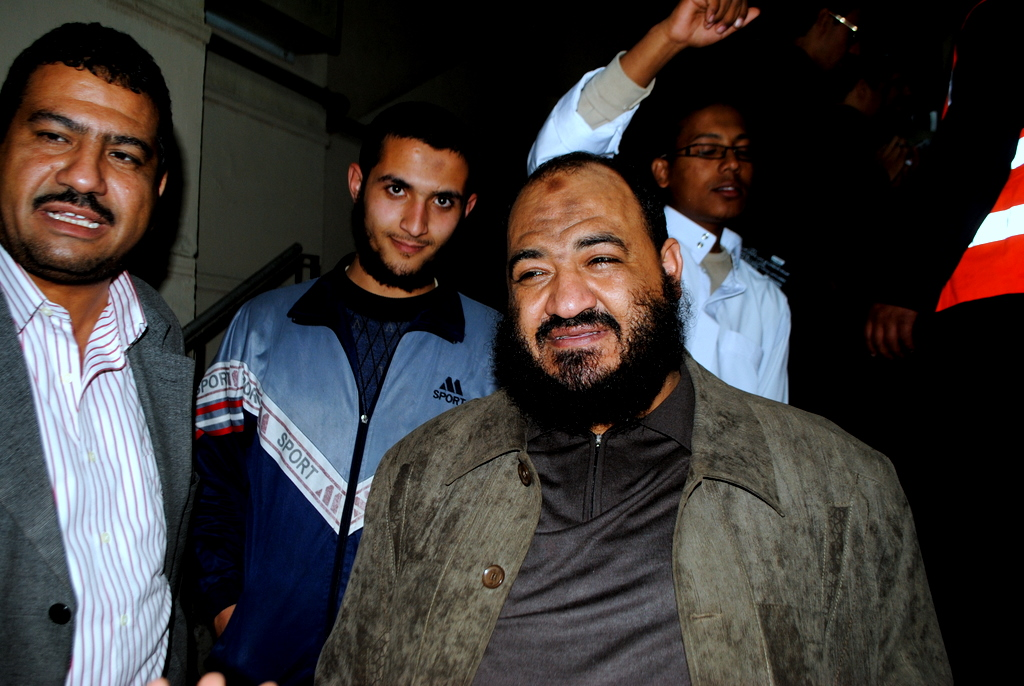
- Born: Alexandria, Egypt
- Education: Alexandria University (Bachelor of Engineering)
- Occupation: Politician

'Abd al-Mun'im al-Shahhat (Arabic: عبد المنعم الشحات) (born 1970 in Alexandria) is a religious preacher, TV Host, and the official spokesman of the Egyptian Salafist group al-Da'wa al-Salafiya ("The Salafist Call"). He graduated from the faculty of Engineering in Alexandria University in 1992. He became a regular guest on talk shows after the 2011 Egyptian revolution as his opinions about tourism and Naguib Mahfouz's novels were publicly debated.

A Salafist, El Shahat has called for Egyptians of the Baháʼí Faith to be prosecuted for treason and for ancient Egyptian statues to be covered in wax.

Following the 2012 Port Said Stadium riot, El Shahat claimed that football is prohibited in Islam, and that the only permitted sports in Islam are shooting, swimming, and horseback riding.

El Shahat and his group supported the 2013 Egyptian coup d'etat which ousted Egypt's first elected president, Mohamed Morsi.
