= 2014 Farafra ambush =

Terror attack in Egypt's New Valley Governorate

- Part of the Post-coup unrest in Egypt
Date	19 July 2014
Location	New Valley Governorate, Egypt 27°3′30″N 27°58′12″E

Belligerents
Ansar Bait al-Maqdis	Egyptian Army

Commanders and leaders
Hesham Ashmawy	Mohamed Darwish

Strength
20 gunmen	Unknown

Casualties and losses
8 killed	22 killed
- Location within Egypt

The 2014 Farafra ambush (also called 2014 Al-Wadi Al-Gedid attack) occurred on 19 July 2014 when unidentified gunmen ambushed a desert checkpoint in the Farafra Oasis Road in Egypt's New Valley Governorate. Twenty-two border guards were killed in the attack, which was one of the biggest since the July 2013 ouster of Egyptian president Mohamed Morsi and the second at the same checkpoint in less than three months.

== Background ==
Militant groups such as Ansar Bait al-Maqdis have ramped up an anti-military campaign that involves bombings and shootings in Egypt since the 2013 coup d'état which saw the removal of President Mohamed Morsi, followed by a violent crackdown on his supporters. The same checkpoint was attacked less than two months earlier when five army conscripts were killed by gunmen.

The perpetrators of the second attack were initially described as smugglers by security officials interviewed by Reuters, who said that they are being paid by their militant comrades in Egypt to ship them weapons from Libya, a country plagued by instability following the 2011 NATO-backed uprising that toppled Muammar Gaddafi.

== Attack ==
The checkpoint, situated on the Farafra Oasis Road near the borders with Libya, was attacked by 20 gunmen, initially described as smugglers, in weapon-mounted vehicles with machine guns as well as rocket-propelled grenades that were used to blow up an ammunitions storage. After the 30-minute exchange of fire, the checkpoint was destroyed, killing 21 soldiers, with some burned to death and others wounded. This was followed by clashes where three of the attackers were killed by security forces. The militants also tried to infiltrate the site with two booby trapped vehicles, but the army said that they were retrieved and defused by bomb experts. Ambulances were sent to the location, as well as reinforcements which included army helicopters and special forces to hunt down the militants.

=== Investigation ===
Military investigations showed that one of the vehicles used was stolen from the previous incident on the same checkpoint. They also indicated that the attack was planned and that heavy cast bullets were found at the site. The slain attackers were held by authorities and were later identified as non-Egyptians by the military prosecutor. A security source suspected the involvement of Ansar Bait al-Maqdis, adding that an Islamic black standard was raised during the assault.

=== Convictions ===
On 11 October 2017, thirteen people were sentenced to death by a military court for their involvement in the attack—twelve of them in absentia. An additional ten people were convicted in absentia in December 2017, including Hesham Ashmawy of Ansar Bait al-Maqdis. Ashmawy was captured by the Libyan National Army on 8 October 2018, and extradited to Egypt in May 2019. In November 2019, he was sentenced to death for the attack, as well as for thirteen other crimes.

== Reactions ==
Egyptian President Abdel Fattah el-Sisi issued a presidential decree where he announced three days of national mourning, calling the incident a "terrorist attack". The presidency released a statement saying that the "heinous crime that took these brave souls and spilled their blood will not go unanswered". "Terrorism will be uprooted from every part of Egypt. All those responsible for perpetrating these acts and acting outside of the law will receive their rightful punishment," the statement added. The government declared a state of emergency along the borders with Sudan several hours after the attacks, while Defense Minister Sedki Sobhi's concerns were about the Egyptian-Libyan border due to weak Libyan government measures to counter the threat of weapons' smuggling into Egypt. He added that the military was coordinating with the Interior Ministry in a large surveillance operation in the area. The president-led National Defence Council met the same night, where it was vowed that the attack would be avenged.

The assault was also condemned by Prime Minister Ibrahim Mahlab, the country's Grand Mufti Shawki Allam, Al-Azhar, the Coptic Orthodox Church, as well as the Egyptian Organization for Human Rights. The Dostour Party rejected it as a "cowardly criminal attack on soldiers carrying out their duty" and offered condolences to families of the slain officers and called on the government to arrest the perpetrators. Hamdeen Sabahi's Popular Current criticized the government and held it responsible for the incident, demanding more effective counter-terrorism measures and the arrest of the attackers to be brought to trial.

International

- Arab League – Secretary-General of the Arab League, Nabil Elaraby, condemned the incident, adding that it was an attempt to destabilize Egypt's security and stability. He also stressed the league's support for the country against all forms of terrorism.
- France – France's Foreign Ministry condemned the attack in a statement, offering its condolences to the victims' families. "France stands beside the authorities and people of Egypt in their fight against terrorism," it added.
- Jordan – Jordanian Minister of State and Media Affairs, Mohamed al-Momani, condemned the attack and expressed the kingdom's solidarity with the Egyptian people in their struggle against terrorism stressing Jordan's position "which rejects all acts of terrorism and violence regardless of the motives and sources". Later that day, King Abdullah II phoned both Egypt and Tunisia's presidents, due to a similar attack in Tunisia two days earlier, offering them his condolences and condemning "such cowardly terrorist acts". He also expressed his solidarity with Egypt and Tunisia, as well as the families of the victims.
- Sudan – The Sudanese government condemned the attack, stressing its "keenness on Egypt's security and stability" and rejecting any similar act. "The government of Sudan would like to convey through the Foreign Ministry the condolences and sympathy of the Sudanese people and government to the Egyptian government and people as well as the families and relatives of the martyrs", it said in a statement.
- Tunisia – The Tunisian presidency released a Facebook statement condemning the attack. "Tunisia condemns this terrorist and coward attack on the Egyptian army," the statement said. It also offered condolences to the Egyptian people and government.
- United Kingdom – Minister Tobias Ellwood of the Foreign and Commonwealth Office condemned the attack, offering his condolences and his support for the investigation. "I strongly condemn the appalling terrorist attack on a border guard checkpoint near Farafra on Saturday. My thoughts are with the families of those killed and wounded and all those affected. The Egyptian authorities have our support as they investigate this incident and seek to prevent further attacks," he said.
- United States – The United States Department of State released a press statement condemning the incident. "We extend our condolences to the families of the victims, and hope for the quick and full recovery of the wounded. A prosperous and dynamic Egypt requires an environment of security and stability, and the United States continues to support the Egyptian Government’s efforts to counter the threat of terrorism in Egypt as part of our commitment to the strategic partnership between our two countries," the statement read.
