= Hassan Abu Basha =

Egyptian military officer and politician (1922–2005)

Minister of Local Government
- In office July 1984 – 1986
- President: Hosni Mobarak

Minister of Interior
- In office January 1982 – July 1984
- President: Hosni Mobarak
- Preceded by: Nabawi Ismail
- Succeeded by: Ahmed Rushdi

Personal details
- Born: 2 December 1922 Cairo, Kingdom of Egypt
- Died: 18 September 2005 (aged 82) Cairo, Egypt
- Party: Arab Socialist Union

Military service
- Rank: Major General

Hassan Abu Basha (Arabic: حسن أبو باشا, romanized: Ḥasan Abũ Bāshā; 2 December 1922 – 18 September 2005) was a major general and one of the former ministers of interior of Egypt who was in office for two years from January 1982 to July 1984.

== Early life and education ==
Abu Basha was born in Cairo on 2 December 1922. He graduated from the police academy in 1945.

== Career ==
Abu Basha was a leading figure during the Nasser era. He was a member of the Arab Socialist Union from 1962 and became part of its secret unit, the Socialist Vanguard (Arabic: al-Tanzim al-Tali‘i), which was also called the Vanguard Organization, in 1963 when the unit was established. He served as deputy minister of Interior when Nabawi Ismail was in office under President Anwar Sadat. As assistant minister, he organized operations against fundamentalists and arrested them at the end of the 1970s. He also led such operations following the assassination of Anwar Sadat in October 1981.

Abu Basha was appointed interior minister in January 1982 by President Hosni Mobarak, replacing Nabawi Ismail in the post. Abu Basha preferred dialogue instead of coercion to deal with social and political problems. His attitude towards the Islamists, including the Muslim Brotherhood, had positive consequences. Abu Basha's term lasted until July 1984 when he was replaced by Ahmed Rushdi as interior minister. Abu Basha's removal was unexpected, since he was considered to be one of the significant figures in the regime of Mobarak. Abu Basha was appointed minister of local government in July 1984 and was in office until 1986.

== Assassination attempt ==
On 5 May 1987, Abu Basha survived an assassination attempt perpetrated by the Islamist militants, including Ayman Zawahiri's brother Hussein Zawahiri. The attack was organized near Abu Basha's home in Cairo, and unknown gunmen seriously injured Abu Basha. Abu Basha underwent surgery following the attack.

The terrorist group Survivors of Hell claimed the responsibility of the attack. Some members of the group were arrested in August 1987. The group also attempted to kill former interior minister Nabawi Ismail and an Egyptian journalist after the attack.

Upon this event, Egypt broke all diplomatic ties with Iran, claiming that the group which perpetrated the attack was financially supported by Iran. Hussein Zawahiri was convicted for his alleged role in the assassination attempt. Yasser Borhamy was also detained for a month due to his alleged connection with the assassination attempt against Abu Basha.

== Personal life and death ==
Abu Basha was married and had three children, a son and two daughters. He died at the age of 82 in Cairo on 18 September 2005.

=== Books ===
Abu Basha published his memoirs in a book entitled Mudhukrat Hasan Abu Basha (Arabic: Memoirs of Hasan Abu Basha) in 1990.

== Awards ==
Abu Basha was the recipient of the Republic second class medal in 1973 and the second class merit medal in 1979.

Political offices
Preceded by Nabawi Ismail	Minister of Interior; 1982 – 1984	Succeeded by Ahmed Rushdi
