= Zakaria Azmi =

Egyptian politician (born 1938)

Zakaria Azmi (Arabic: زكريا عزمي; born 26 June 1938) is the former chief of presidential staff in Egypt.

== Career ==
Zakaria Azmi was the National Democratic Party's (NDP) deputy for el-Zeitoun district in eastern Cairo and chief of the presidential staff. He had joined the NDP following its establishment in 1978, was elected to the People's Assembly in 1987 and appointed chief of the presidential staff in 1989. Azmi was one of the army officers who supported late Egyptian president Anwar el-Sadat in his conflict with Nasserist rivals in 1971. This earned him the post of manager of the office of the presidential chief of staff in 1975.

He became more involved in politics when he was elected in 1979 as deputy chairman of the Cairo Municipal Council. His overtly critical approach in People's Assembly debates led many observers to dub him "the representative of the NDP opposition wing in parliament". Azmi spoke against the terms of US economic grants to Egypt, corruption in city councils and pollution in Cairo. For example, in May 1997, Azmi was involved in a confrontation with Mohamed Abul-Enein, a businessman appointed by President Mubarak to parliament. The showdown was described by newspapers as "a confrontation between money and power". Newspapers also said that Azmi had "become a parliamentary phenomenon". Azmi was promoted to the NDP's secretariat-general in 1993.

He served as deposed president Hosni Mubarak's chief of staff from 1989 until his deposition during the 2011 Egyptian Revolution. Azmi is considered by Egyptians to have been an influential figure in Mubarak's regime and participants and supporters of the revolution demanded he be tried. On April 7, 2011, Egyptian state prosecutors ordered that he be jailed for fifteen days pending a corruption investigation.
