= Zaki Badr =

Egyptian major general and interior minister (1926–1997)

Minister of Interior
- In office 27 February 1986 – January 1990
- Prime Minister: Atef Sedki
- Preceded by: Ahmed Rushdi
- Succeeded by: Abdul Halim Moussa

Personal details
- Born: 28 February 1926 Minya province
- Died: 2 April 1997 (aged 71) United States
- Children: Ahmed Zaki
- Education: Police Academy

Military service
- Rank: Major General

Zaki Badr (Arabic: زكي بدر; 28 February 1926 – 2 April 1997) was an Egyptian major general and the former interior minister of Egypt who served in the post from 1986 to 1990 in the Sedki Cabinet. Badr had a confrontational approach during his term.

== Early life and education ==
Badr was born in the Minya province of the southern Egypt on 28 February 1926. He graduated from the police academy in 1946.

== Career ==
Badr began his career as a police officer in 1947. He served as the governor of Asyut in the Upper Egypt. He also served in the ministry of interior during the term of Nabawi Ismail and was in charge of the central region of Minya. He was the key man in the Egyptian government's struggle against the underground extremists cells. He took strong measures on Asyut when extremists rioted in the city after the assassination of Anwar Sadat in October 1981.

=== Minister of Interior ===
Badr was appointed interior minister on 27 February 1986, replacing Ahmed Rushdi in the post. Shortly after his appointment Badr fired or transferred hundreds of security officials from March to August 1986. He was the most disliked man in the cabinet due to his hardliner approach against Islamic "fundamentalist" movements. He confronted nearly all groups in the society in order to achieve the regime's goal of eliminating Islamist militant entities in Egypt.

Badr also toughly struggled against drug trafficking, black market currency speculation and extremism during his term. On the other hand, human rights activists in Egypt criticized him for the violations of civil liberties, since his brutal policies were experienced everywhere in the country, including the universities. Badr ordered the arrest for the relatives of the fugitive Islamic Group leaders. These people were tortured at Ain Shams police station and the state security intelligence department in Lazughli. This event was one of the triggers of the assassination attempt against Badr in 1989. However, Badr was a frequent and respectful guest at gatherings of Copts who supported his iron fist.

Badr was sacked by the President Hosni Mubarak on 12 January 1990 and replaced by Abdul Halim Moussa in the post. No explanation was given for the dismissal of Badr. However, a scandal he had been involved in was the reason for his removal. On the other hand, Najib Ghadbian regards Badr's removal as one of three steps towards democracy in Egypt occurred in 1990.

=== Assassination attempt ===
During his term as interior minister on 16 December 1989, Badr became the target of an assassination attempt when a Suzuki pickup truck loaded with gunpowder exploded in a Cairo suburb seconds before his motorcade was to pass. He survived the attack, and nobody was hurt in the blast. The driver of the truck, a 24-year-old medical student named Youssef Hasan Mahmoud, was arrested while trying to escape the scene. The perpetrators were the members of the Islamic Group whose relatives had been arrested and tortured earlier, including Ayman Zawahiri.

=== Controversy ===
When he was interior minister, Badr referred to Islamist extremists as "mad dogs, with all respect to dogs." In 1994, Badr and his successor as interior minister Abdul Halim Moussa accused each other of corruption and wrongdoing.

== Personal life and death ==
Badr was married and had two sons. One of his sons, Ahmad Zaki, was appointed minister of education by Hosni Mubarak in 2010. His family founded a charitable foundation, the Zaki Badr Foundation, in the United States.

Badr died at a hospital in the United States on 2 April 1997.

Political offices
| Preceded by Ahmed Rushdi | Minister of Interior; 1986 – 1990 | Succeeded by Abdul Halim Moussa |
