= Hesham Ashmawy =

Egyptian terrorist who previously was an Egyptian Army officer

- هشام علي عشماوي مسعد إبراهيم
- Ashmawy appearing in a propaganda video by al-Mourabitoun, a Libya-based militant group which he led from Derna. His nom de guerre, "Abu Omar al-Muhajir", appears below.
- Born: Hesham Ali Ashmawy Mos'ad Ibrahim; 1978
- Died: 4 March 2020 (aged 41–42)
- Military career
- Allegiance: Egypt (1996–2011); Ansar Bait al-Maqdis (2013–2014); Al-Mourabitoun (2015–2018)

Hesham Ali Ashmawy Mos'ad Ibrahim (Arabic: هشام علي عشماوي مسعد إبراهيم; 1978 – 4 March 2020) was a convicted terrorist who previously was an Egyptian Army officer, suspected by the government of having orchestrated and been involved in a number of terrorist attacks on security targets and state institutions, including the 2014 Farafra ambush and the 2015 assassination of Prosecutor general Hisham Barakat.

Ashmawy joined the military in 1996 and eventually became an officer in the Thunderbolt unit. He showed increasing signs of radicalization over the years, which was further aggravated by his father's death in 2010. Accusations of spreading extremist thought and of incitement against the Egyptian Armed Forces led to his eventual dismissal from the military in 2011 under circumstances that remain unclear. He embraced al-Qaeda and went on to join Ansar Bait al-Maqdis in 2012, but eventually defected from the group in 2015, following its declaration of allegiance to the Islamic State of Iraq and the Levant. He formed instead his own network, al-Mourabitoun, which based itself in Libya and remained loyal to al-Qaeda.

He became one of Egypt's most wanted militants, before being arrested on 8 October 2018, during a counter-insurgency operation by the Libyan National Army in Derna. On 28 May 2019, Ashmawy was handed over to the Egyptian authorities. He was executed on 4 March 2020.

== Early life and military career ==
Ashmawy was born in 1978. His father, Ali Ashmawy, was a French language teacher, and his mother, Ghalia Ali Abdelmegid, worked in a school. Little information exists about his life prior to joining the Egyptian Armed Forces, though he was known by family and friends to be an association football enthusiast. In 2003, Lieutenant Ashmawy married Nesreen Sayed Ali, a former senior year student in Abdelmegid's school who became a teaching assistant at Ain Shams University. They had two sons and lived in a building that was built by his father in the 10th District of Nasr City, Cairo.

He entered the Egyptian Military Academy in 1996, from which he graduated in 2000. He served in the Egyptian Army, initially as a regular infantryman and later as a special forces officer in the Thunderbolt unit. He trained in camouflage and combat readiness in challenging terrain. Ashmawy was deployed to the Sinai Peninsula for 10 years, during which the 2005 Sharm el-Sheikh and 2006 Dahab bombings took place.

== Radicalization and dismissal ==
Ashmawy started showing signs of extremism in 2000, when he argued with a military-assigned preacher who accidentally misread Quranic verses during a sermon. He ended up being placed under Military Intelligence surveillance as a result of the incident. Around that time, he was also distributing Salafist literature to his colleagues. One of them told Reuters that Ashmawy used to wake his fellow conscripts at dawn and organize Fajr prayers. He also encouraged them "not to accept orders without being convinced of them." Nesreen later described the death of Ashmawy's father in 2010 as turning point in her husband's life, after which he became depressed and started reading the works of Sunni theologian Ibn Taymiyyah. He prayed more frequently and visited mosques during leaves.

He was interrogated for the first time in 2006, a year in which a close friend of his may have been tortured and killed in state custody. Ashmawy was accused during the investigation of holding radical and inciting views aimed at state institutions. He severed ties with most of his army and SSI colleagues following the death of his friend, according to Ashmawy's nephew. He was tried in 2007 for continued incitement, and was reassigned to an administrative post in the Popular Defense Forces branch of the Egyptian military. The exact dates and circumstances under which Ashmawy left the military are conflicting. A military court hearing in 2011 decided that he should be formally dismissed from the Armed Forces.

== Militancy ==
Ashmawy travelled to Turkey in April 2013 and then crossed into the Syrian border and had a meeting with ISIS commanders. He regularly visited the al-Anwar al-Muhamadiyya Mosque in Cairo's Matareya district between 2010 and 2012. Meetings between him and "extremist elements" became frequent after he left the military, according to an October 2015 episode about Ashmawy on Death Making, an Al Arabiya program. During that time, he started embracing Islamic militancy as an ideology, particularly the al-Qaeda brand. Ashmawy managed to form a militant cell with four other suspended officers following his 2011 dismissal, and later joined Ansar Bait al-Maqdis (ABM) in 2013 and gradually rose in the group's ranks. The Ministry of Interior also traced down a trip that he made to Turkey on 27 April 2013, and then later across the border into Syria, where he is suspected by authorities to have fought alongside al-Nusra Front.

Ashmawy's name appeared in the media for the first time in September 2013, as one of the prime suspects in the attempted assassination of interior minister Mohamed Ibrahim Moustafa, the other suspects being Emad Abdel Hamid and suicide bomber Waleed Badr. Security forces raided his house and the gym he frequented later that same year. They found a large amount of combat training equipment in his residence. His wife later told the prosecution that she hadn't heard from him since the assassination attempt. Egyptian authorities have linked his name with several militant cells and operations throughout the following year, including the Arab Sharkas case and the 2014 Farafra ambush, which he had personally executed and previously planned while based in Ansar al-Sharia camps in Libya. Ashmawy was assigned the training of ABM recruits in 2014, and commanded the organization's cells in the Egyptian mainland. He fell out with ABM that same year, however, when it declared allegiance to the Islamic State of Iraq and the Levant (ISIL) and became Wilayat Sinai. ABM, both in Sinai and in the mainland, had consequently split between members loyal to ISIL and some others linked to al-Qaeda. Ashmawy's mainland operations were gradually taken over by Wilayat Sinai commander Ashraf al-Gharably.

=== Al-Mourabitoun ===
His name resurfaced in the media as a suspect in the assassination of Prosecutor General Hisham Barakat in July 2015. He announced in a video that same month the formation of a network named al-Mourabitoun which would remain loyal to al-Qaeda rather than ISIL, to which the latter responded later on by referring to Ashmawy as an "apostate" and issuing a bounty on his life. Ashmawy's al-Mourabitoun based itself in Libya and developed close ties with the local Shura Council of Mujahideen in Derna. During the same video announcement, he encouraged Muslims to wage global jihad and denounced Egypt's government and its president, Abdel Fattah el-Sisi. Ashmawy's tactics differed from those of ISIL. The latter would often employ suicide bombing as a method, while the former favored car bombings and did not claim responsibility for his attacks. ISIL also tends to focus on territorial expansion while Ashmawy emphasized guerrilla warfare. Zack Gold, an analyst at the Center for Naval Analyses, described him as "a boogeyman for the Egyptian army." Ashmawy released a second statement in March 2016 in the form of an audio communique accompanied by image slides that included a photo of him in military uniform and a panorama of Jerusalem with the words "O Aqsa, we are coming" appearing on the screen. In the message, Ashmawy called on Egyptian ulama and clerics to rally Muslim youth and encourage them "to expel the invaders from the abode of Islam and wage jihad against the criminal el-Sisi, his soldiers, and supporters."

Ashmawy gave himself the nom de guerre "Abu Omar al-Mujhajir", and became associated with other militant groups like Jund al-Islam and Ansar al-Islam. The latter, which he was suspected of leading, claimed responsibility for the Bahariya Oasis attack in October 2017 that killed between 16 and 54 security personnel. His deputy, Emad Abdel Hamid, was killed in a retaliatory airstrike in Egypt's Western Desert later that month. Ashmawy, under the nickname "Abu Mohannad", was sentenced to death in absentia by a military court on 27 December 2017, along with ten other defendants, for various terrorism-related charges as part of a case called Ansar Bait al-Maqdis 3 by local media. When he was arrested the following year, Egyptian media credited him with 17 attacks, including the Barakat assassination, the 2015 Italian Consulate bombing, the Minya bus attack and the Bahariya attack, among others. "Every major attack, he either has been behind it or has been blamed for it," according to Gold. He became one of Egypt's most wanted militants prior to his arrest.

== Arrest and death ==
On 8 October 2018, Ahmed al-Mismari, spokesman of the Libyan National Army (LNA), announced the capturing of Ashmawy during a surprise operation by a unit of the 106th Mujahfal Brigade in the mountainous al-Maghar district of Derna. Other militants were also captured, as well as the family of Omar Sorour, al-Mourabitoun's mufti who was killed earlier in June. They were later taken to a barracks in the port city.

Nasser Ahmed al-Najdi, commander of the LNA's Battalion 169, told Asharq Al-Awsat that the operation was the result of intelligence sharing between Egypt's government and the LNA under the command of General Khalifa Haftar, months after a tunnel network was uncovered in Derna during a battle between LNA forces and the Shura Council of Mujahideen for control of the city. The LNA, which fights for the eastern government in the Libyan Civil War, believed that Ashmawy was using that network to move around between cities in the region. According to Najdi, "not a single bullet was fired" during the "successful" operation, which was carried out moments after Ashmawy was spotted trying to leave al-Maghar.

The Libyan authorities said in their statement that Ashmawy would be extradited to Egypt following investigations. The LNA also released video footage from the raid's aftermath showing Ashmawy being escorted to an armored vehicle, as well as photos of his bloodied face. An earlier statement added that he was wearing an explosive belt that failed to detonate when the troops closed in on him. Different teams of Egyptian investigators began arriving in Libya later that day to jointly interrogate Ashmawy with the Libyan authorities. Mismari announced on 1 November that Ashmawy was being tried by a military court in eastern Libya, along with over 200 defendants. He added that Ashmawy took part in the fighting against the LNA in Derna and orchestrated attacks and assassinations of several Libyan officers. On 28 May 2019, Ashmawy was extradited by the Libyan National Army to Egyptian authorities.

On March 4, 2020, Ashmawy's death sentence was carried out.
