= Ahmed Rushdi (politician) =

Egyptian Army general and politician (1924–2013)

Minister of Interior
- In office July 1984 – 27 February 1986
- Prime Minister: Kamal Hassan Ali; Aly Lotfy Mahmoud
- Preceded by: Hassan Abu Basha
- Succeeded by: Zaki Badr

Personal details
- Born: 1924
- Died: 4 July 2013 (aged 88–89)

Military service
- Rank: Lieutenant General

Ahmed Rushdi (1924 – 4 July 2013) was an Egyptian lieutenant general and interior minister who was in office from July 1984 to 27 February 1986.

== Career ==
Rushdi began his career in 1946, working in Egypt's security institutions. He served as the director of Cairo security from 1976 to 1978. Then he became the assistant minister of the interior in 1978. He was appointed interior minister in July 1984, replacing Hassan Abu Basha in the post. Shortly after Rushdi's appointment in November 1984, thousands of students at Cairo's Al Azhar University clashed with anti-riot police, demonstrating for academic reforms and the resignation of him.

Rushdi continued to serve as interior minister when Ali Lutfi was appointed prime minister after the resignation of Kamal Hassan Ali on 4 September 1985. Rushdi was one of the most powerful ministers in the cabinet. He resigned from office on 27 February 1986 due to rebellious activities of the Central Security Forces in Cairo, killing nearly 38 people. The army restored order in Cairo. Rushdi was replaced by Zaki Badr in the post.

Political offices
Preceded by Hassan Abu Basha	Minister of Interior; 1984 – 1986	Succeeded by Zaki Badr
