= Hassan Al Alfi =

Egyptian interior minister (1936–2021)

Minister of Interior
- In office 18 April 1993 – 18 November 1997
- Preceded by: Abdul Halim Moussa
- Succeeded by: Habib Al Adli

Personal details
- Born: 3 March 1936
- Died: 3 November 2021 (aged 85)

Hassan Al Alfi (Arabic: حسن الألفي; 3 March 1936 – 3 November 2021) was an Egyptian police major and politician, who served as governor and interior minister of Egypt from 1993 to 1997. He resigned from office following the Luxor massacre.

== Career ==
Alfi was the governor of Asyut province until 18 April 1993. He was appointed interior minister by President Hosni Mubarak to the cabinet headed by Prime Minister Atef Sedki on 18 April 1993, replacing Abdul Halim Moussa in the post. Alfi was not a member of Mubarak's party when he was appointed. Alfi implemented heavy-handed security steps to crack down on the Islamist militants, reducing their hit-and-run attacks during his tenure.

Alfi resigned from office on 18 November 1997, the day after more than 60 people were murdered by Gama'a al Islamiyya in Luxor. He was succeeded by Habib Al Adli as interior minister.

=== Assassination attempt ===
Alfi survived an assassination attempt in Cairo perpetrated allegedly by Islamist militants on 18 August 1993. However, he was seriously injured in the attack which claimed the lives of at least four people, one of whom was his bodyguard. Egyptian Islamic Jihad was the perpetrator of the attack.

=== Controversy ===
Alfi was tried in Cairo's criminal court due to the allegations of corruption and abuse of power in 1998. The claims were brought by the lawyers of Al Shaab newspaper, an Islamist-oriented daily. The same year the editor-in-chief and a cartoonist of the paper were arrested and sentenced to prison for alleged defamation of Alaa Al Alfi, son of Hassan Al Alfi.

== Death ==
Hassan Al Alfi died on 3 November 2021. His funeral ceremony was held on 4 November.

Political offices
Preceded by Abdul Halim Moussa	Minister of Interior; 1993 – 1997	Succeeded by Habib Al Adli
