= Romain Nadal =

French diplomat

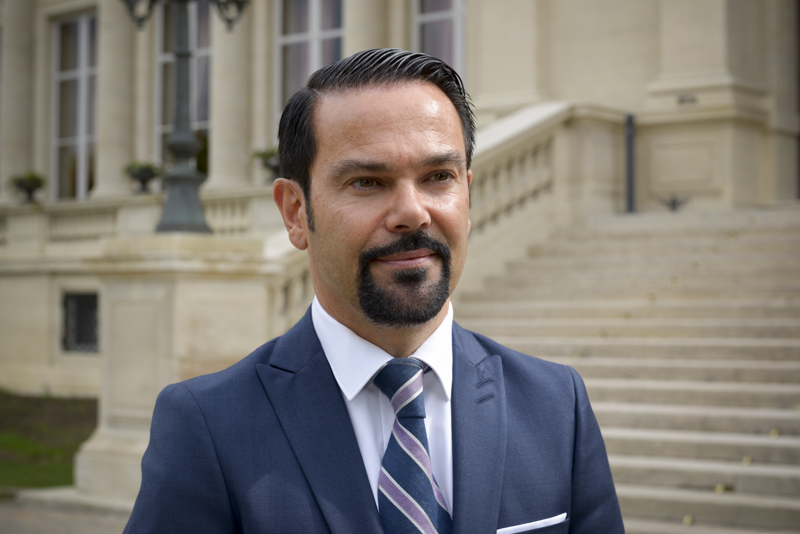

Ambassador of France to Argentina
- Incumbent
- Assumed office 2023
- President: Emmanuel Macron

Romain Nadal (born 19 May 1968) is the current French Ambassador in Argentina.

== Career ==
From 1999 to 2002, Nadal served as diplomatic advisor to the President of the National Assembly (France). From 2002 to 2005, he became the second Secretary at the French Embassy in Spain. From 2005 to 2008, he was Head of the "mission de la modernisation" at the Ministry of Foreign Affairs.

In 2008 he became Deputy Director of Press and Spokesperson, and in 2011 Deputy Director of Communication and Spokesperson. In 2012 Nadal served as the Diplomatic spokesperson for the President of the Republic, and from 2013 to 2017 Spokesperson, director of communication and press at the Ministry of Foreign Affairs.

From 2017 to 2023, he served as the French Ambassador in Venezuela.
