= Ein Netafim ambush =

1990 border incident between Egypt and Israel

On November 26, 1990, an Egyptian border guard crossed into Israel and attacked several vehicles along the Highway 12 road. The attack took place near Ein Netafim, a spring several miles northwest of Eilat. Three Israeli soldiers and one civilian were killed.

== The attack ==
At around dawn, the perpetrator infiltrated into Israel and hid himself in a ditch parallel to Highway 12. Armed with an AK-47 assault rifle and wearing his Egyptian military uniform he shot at passing vehicles from his position in the ditch.

The first target was an empty military van at about 7 a.m. The driver was shot and wounded but managed to escape. A few minutes later, a soldier was shot dead while driving a military car. The third vehicle to be attacked was a military bus without any passengers. The bus was riddled with bullets, killing the driver. After this, another military vehicle drove into the ambush zone. The soldier driving the car exited the vehicle before being shot dead at close range by the gunman.

Following these killings, two buses carrying civilian workers to a nearby military base at Uvda arrived on the scene. The gunman stepped out of the ditch and in front of the buses, bringing their movement to a halt. He then opened fire at the front of the first bus, killing the driver and wounding several passengers. After reloading his weapon, he once again sprayed the buses with gunfire. A security guard on board managed to fire back at the gunman and wound him; forcing him to end his rampage and retreat back across the border into Egypt.

== Aftermath ==
Three Israeli soldiers and one civilian were killed as a result of the attack. Twenty-seven people were injured, five seriously, with all but one being on board one of the two civilian buses.

Israeli Defense Minister Moshe Arens indirectly blamed Egypt for its loose control of the frontier. "Israel expects that Egypt will take all the necessary steps to retain the peace along its border with Israel and to prevent murderers coming from its territory," he stated.

Foreign Minister David Levy told media "It's a very serious situation that has to come to an end. We expect that the Egyptians will do everything necessary to bring this person to trial first of all and second to put an end to the continuation of the slaughter of Israelis on Egyptian territory and along the border."

Palestinian Islamic Jihad claimed responsibility for the attack. In a statement released in Amman the organization said "This morning one of our units operating in Egypt dealt a blow to a Zionist bus at the crossing point between Palestine and Egypt. Five Jews were killed and some wounded and our unit returned safely to its place."

In Egypt, an army conscript was arrested on suspicion of "opening fire on a number of Israeli vehicles carrying Israeli soldiers and workers." Egyptian Foreign Minister Ahmed Asmat Abdel-Meguid said "It is a very regrettable incident, and we are certainly against such kinds of acts, and we shall investigate this affair in detail."

== See also ==
- 2011 southern Israel cross-border attacks
- September 2012 southern Israel cross-border attack
- 2023 Egypt–Israel border shooting incident
