= 2023 Egypt–Israel border shooting incident =

Attacks on Israeli soldiers

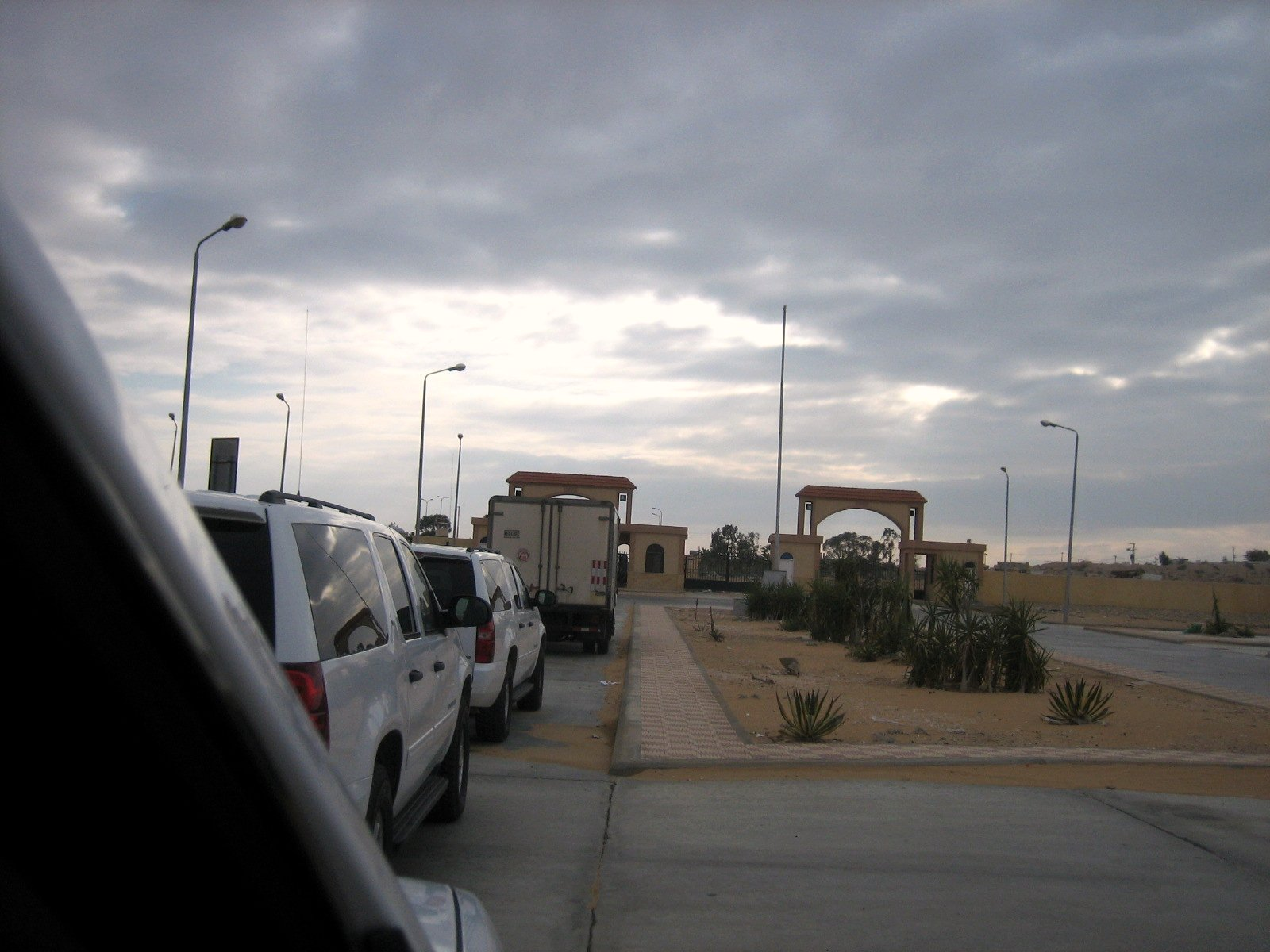
- Nitzana Border Crossing (on the Egyptian side)
- Location: Nitzana Border Crossing, Egypt and Israel
- Date: June 2, 2023; 3 years ago
- Weapon: Kalashnikov rifle
- Deaths: 4 (including the perpetrator)
- Injuries: 2
- Perpetrator: CSF conscript

On 2 June 2023, a trooper of the Central Security Forces crossed over the Egypt–Israel border into Israeli territory, shooting three Israeli soldiers dead and injuring two others before he was killed in a shootout with the Israel Defense Forces.

== Incident ==
The policeman shot and killed two members of the Israel Defense Forces manning a guard post. An Israeli manhunt for the shooter was launched and a few hours later he killed an Israeli soldier and injured two others in a shootout. During the exchange of gunfire, the policeman was shot and killed. The Guardian reported the incident had taken place around the Nitzana Border Crossing.

== Aftermath ==
Egyptian authorities released what the BBC called a "vaguely-worded statement" asserting the police officer was taking part in an anti-smuggling chase when he crossed the border. A drug smuggling attempt had taken place hours before the shootings; Israeli officials said they had confiscated 1.5 million shekels worth of goods overnight. Egypt expressed condolences for the families of the victims and said it would open an investigation. Lieutenant General Mohamed Ahmed Zaki, the Egyptian Minister of Defense, talked over the phone to the Israeli Minister of Defense, Yoav Gallant, to discuss the circumstances of the accident and offer condolences to the victims of the accident from both sides, in addition to joint coordination to take the necessary measures to prevent the recurrence of such incidents in the future.

== See also ==
- Ein Netafim ambush
- 2011 southern Israel cross-border attacks
- September 2012 southern Israel cross-border attack
