= Arab Sharkas case =

The Arab Sharkas case is the name given to the military trial of nine men in Egypt in August 2014. Six defendants were sentenced to death in October, and executed in May 2015.

According to military prosecutors for the government of Egyptian president Abdel Fattah el-Sisi, the defendants killed soldiers during a military raid in the village of Arab Sharkas in March 2014. Human rights organizations have stated that some of the defendants were imprisoned prior to the raid, or arrested elsewhere in Egypt; it is not clear if any were present at the raid. The defendants were tortured during their imprisonment, and refused an appeal prior to their executions. The case has been denounced by international human rights organizations.

== Military raid on Arab Sharkas village ==
The prosecution accused the defendants of killing a colonel and brigadier general during a firefight in the Qaliubiya village of Arab Sharkas, in northern Egypt, in March 2014. The firefight occurred during a government raid that killed six; prosecutors said that eight who were not killed were detained.

According to Amnesty International and Human Rights Watch, three of the six executed were already imprisoned by Egyptian security forces at a secret location - the Al-Azouly Military Prison - prior to the raid in which they were said to have been captured.

Egyptian military prosecutors also accused the defendants of carrying out a shooting on a military bus in the Amiriya district of Cairo in March 2014, killing one soldier. Prosecutors furthermore stated the defendants were responsible for a later checkpoint attack in Cairo that killed six soldiers.

== Trial and execution ==
The defendants include Mohamed Bakry, Hany Amer, Mohamed Afifi, Abdel rahman Said, Khaled Farg and Islam Said, and were tortured in custody. They are said to have confessed they belong to Ansar Bait Al-Maqdis, considered a terrorist group by the Egyptian government. Now called Welayet Sinai, the organization is said to have ties to ISIS. One of the defendants, Said, was a high school student.

The military courts faced a suit calling for the death sentences to be halted, but postponed hearing the suit until two days after the executions were already carried out. Lawyers representing the defendants were not informed of their impending executions.

One lawyer, Ahmed Helmy, said that the executions were meant to broadcast that the el-Sisi government was able and willing to carry out executions following former president Morsi's conviction.

Two defendants were sentenced to life in prison, and another sentenced to death in absentia.

== Egyptian and international reaction ==
Human rights organizations including Amnesty International urged Egypt not to carry through the executions, and called the executions "an egregious new low" in which civilians had been tried by military courts. Human Rights Monitor, based in London, stated that the court "ignored all evidence that might enable the defendants to be acquitted," called only one witness (an Egyptian government security officer), and used torture to extract confessions.

The Egyptian Freedom and Justice Party, dissolved by the el-Sisi government, called the executions a crime.

The Egyptian Revolutionary Council, an organization opposed to president el-Sisi, stated in response to the executions that el-Sisi's government executes "innocent Egyptians for political scores." The organization leader Dr. Maha Azzam stated that the "Egyptian regime has to be held directly accountable for the execution of citizens without any due process;" she condemned western governments for supporting the executions.

The World Socialist Web Site stated that the trial and executions in the Arab Sharkas case paralleled those used against Morsi and the Muslim Brotherhood, and condemned continued American financial support for the Egyptian military.

== See also ==
- 2013 Egyptian coup d'état
