= Hussein al-Zawahiri =

Hussein al-Zawahiri حسين الظواهري
- Born: Hussein Mohammed Rabie al-Zawahiri; 20th century Egypt
- Arrested: 2001; Malaysia; Central Intelligence Agency
- Released: 2000
- Citizenship: Egyptian
- Status: Released

Hussein Mohammed Rabie al-Zawahiri (Arabic: حسين محمد ربيع الظواهري) was one of 14 people subjected to extraordinary rendition by the CIA prior to the 2001 declaration of a war on terror.

He was captured in Malaysia, and renditioned to Egypt.

He had no known connection to terrorism, other than that he was the younger brother of militant leader Ayman al-Zawahiri. He was released in 2000.
