= Muhammad Husayn al-Dhahabi =

Egyptian teacher and politician

Muhammad Husayn al-Dhahabi (October 19, 1915 — July 7, 1977) was an Al-Azhar scholar and the former Egyptian Minister of Religious Endowments. He was a critic of the militant jihadist movement that had splintered from the mainstream Muslim Brotherhood. On July 3, 1977, he was kidnapped by the radical group Takfir wal-Hijra, who held him hostage and demanded the release of imprisoned members of their movement. When their demand was not met, they executed al-Dhahabi. Following his execution, the government of Anwar Sadat cracked down on militant Islamic organizations in Egypt.
