= Steven Simon =

American international security expert

Steven Simon is a former United States National Security Council senior director for the Middle East and North Africa. He also previously served as the Executive Director IISS-US and Corresponding Director IISS-Middle East and as a Senior Fellow at the Middle East Institute based in Washington, D.C. He was Hasib J. Sabbagh Senior Fellow for Middle Eastern Studies, at the Council on Foreign Relations. He was a Spring 2008 Berlin Prize Fellow. Steven Simon is now a visiting professor at Colby College in Maine.

== Education ==
Simon holds a BA in Classics and Near Eastern Languages from Columbia University, an MTS from Harvard Divinity School, and an MPA from Princeton University.

== Career ==
In 1999 Steven Simon moved to Britain, where he worked as Deputy Director of the International Institute for Strategic Studies (IISS). Before he moved to London, Simon was Director for Global Issues and Senior Director for Transnational Threats at the White House. After Simon left the IISS he specialized in Middle Eastern affairs at the RAND Corporation, before he became a Senior Fellow for Middle Eastern Studies at the Council of Foreign Relations (CFR).

He was an International Affairs Fellow at Oxford University and a University Fellow at Brown University.

== Works ==
- "The Price of the Surge", Foreign Affairs, May/June 2008
- "Can the Right War Be Won?", Foreign Affairs, July/August 2009
- "Why We Should Put Jihad on Trial". The New York Times. November 17, 2009.
- "America's Great Satan", Foreign Affairs, November/December 2019 (with Daniel Benjamin)

Books

- Daniel Benjamin, Steven Simon, The Age of Sacred Terror. Radical Islam's War Against America, Random House, New York 2002, ISBN 978-0-375-50859-2
- Daniel Benjamin; Steven Simon (2006). The Next Attack: The Failure of the War on Terror and a Strategy for Getting it Right. Macmillan. ISBN 978-1-4668-0325-1.
- Dana H. Allin; Steven Simon (2011). The sixth crisis: Iran, Israel, America and the rumors of war. Oxford University Press. ISBN 978-0-19-975449-6.
- Steven Simon (2023). Grand Delusion: The Rise and Fall of American Ambition in the Middle East. Penguin Press. ISBN 978-0-73-522424-7.
