= Abdul Halim Moussa =

Egyptian major general (1930–2003)

Minister of Interior
- In office January 1990 – 18 April 1993
- President: Hosni Mubarak
- Preceded by: Zaki Badr
- Succeeded by: Hassan Al Alfi

Personal details
- Born: c. 1930
- Died: 19 July 2003 (aged 73) Cairo, Egypt
- Education: Police Academy

Military service
- Rank: Major General

Abdul Halim Moussa (Arabic: عبد الحليم موسى; c. 1930 – 2003) was an Egyptian police major general and interior minister who was in office from 1990 to 1993.

== Early life and education ==
Moussa was born around 1930. He graduated from the police academy in 1954.

== Career and activities ==
Moussa served as a director of public security and held the rank of police major general. He was named governor of the southern province of Asyut. He was appointed minister of interior by President Hosni Mubarak in January 1990, replacing Zaki Badr in the post. Moussa's appointment was commonly welcomed by the Egyptian public. Unlike his successor, he adopted a conciliatory approach toward Islamic groups during his term.

In December 1992, Moussa argued that there were more than 2,000 members of Iran's Revolutionary Guards in Sudan and that they were training Egyptian extremists in the camps. In early April 1993 he supported the establishment of a mediation committee by the independent ulemas who opposed the violent activities of the Islamists. Moussa's term lasted until 18 April 1993 when he was fired by Mubarak due to his failure in ending the violence perpetrated by Islamic insurgents and due to his endorsement of the ulemas' mediation committee plan. The day before his dismissal Moussa stated that a dialogue had been opened towards the Islamic militants. Hassan Al Alfi replaced Moussa as interior minister.

=== Assassination attempts ===
Moussa escaped unhurt after four assassination attempts all by the Egyptian Islamic Jihad when he was in office as interior minister. The first attempt was in October 1990. However, not Moussa but the parliamentary speaker Rif'at al-Mahjub was killed in the attack. In the last attempt, Moussa's driver, who was a relative of the group, was killed and perpetrators apologized to the family of the driver.

=== Controversy ===
Zaki Badr, Moussa's successor as interior minister, accused him of corruption and wrongdoing in January 1994.

== Death ==
Moussa was diagnosed with cancer in 2002. He died of cancer at the age of 73 in Cairo on 19 July 2003.

Political offices
Preceded by Zaki Badr	Minister of Interior; 1986–1990	Succeeded by Hassan Al Alfi
