= Nabawi Ismail =

Egyptian politician (1925–2009)

Deputy Prime Minister

Minister of Interior
- In office 1977 – January 1982
- Prime Minister: Ahmad Fuad Mohieddin; Mustafa Khalil; Anwar Sadat
- Preceded by: Mamdouh Salim
- Succeeded by: Hassan Abu Basha

Personal details
- Born: Mohammed Nabawi İsmail; 1925 Al Darb Al Ahmar district, Kingdom of Egypt
- Died: 15 June 2009 (aged 83–84) Cairo, Egypt
- Party: Arab Socialist Union; National Democratic Party
- Education: Police academy

Nabawi Ismail (1925 – 15 June 2009) was one of the ministers of Interior of Egypt who was in office when Anwar Sadat was assassinated. Therefore, he is the last minister of Interior of Sadat.

== Early life and education ==
Ismail was born in Al Darb Al Ahmar district in 1925. He studied at the Police Academy and graduated in 1946. He also studied law after graduating from the academy.

== Career ==
After his graduation, Ismail joined the general security service of Egypt in 1952. He was a member of the Arab Socialist Union from 1962 and became part of its secret unit, the Socialist Vanguard (Arabic: al-Tanzim al-Tali‘i), which was also called the Vanguard Organization, in 1963 when the unit was established. In 1971, he was appointed director of Mamdouh Salim's office, who is one of the former prime ministers and interior ministers. Ismail was deputy interior minister before his appointment as minister of interior. He was appointed minister of interior in 1977 to the cabinet led by Prime Minister Ahmad Fuad Mohieddin, replacing Mamdouh Salim in the post. Ismail retained the post in the next cabinet formed on 2 October 1978 by Mustafa Khalil. Ismail joined the National Democratic Party which became the ruling party in 1978 and was made its deputy secretary general.

Ismail was sitting next to President Anwar Sadat during the ceremony where Sadat was assassinated in October 1981. Following the assassination, Islamist militants who were armed university students rioted in Asyut occupied the security department building in the city killing soldiers. Upon this event, Ismail went to the city and stayed there until the terrorists were exterminated.

President Hosni Mobarak, successor of Anwar Sadat, fired Ismail in January 1982. He was replaced by Hassan Abu Basha, who was his senior aide at the interior ministry, in the post. However, Ismail continued to serve as deputy prime minister, which he had assumed during his term as interior minister. As deputy prime minister, Ismail was in charge of civil services and local governments. After leaving public office, Ismail was hired as a consultant by an Islamic investment company, al Rayyan.

=== Assassination attempt ===
Four gunmen in a car opened fire at Ismail's home in August 1987. He survived the attack. The Survivors of Hell group was the perpetrator of the attack. Some members of the group were arrested in August 1987.

== Death ==
Ismail died at Dar Al Fouad Hospital in Cairo on 15 June 2009.

Political offices
Preceded by Mamdouh Salim	Minister of Interior; 1977 – 1982	Succeeded by Hassan Abu Basha
