= Ashraf Salem Zaher =

Egyptian Minister of Defense (born 1969)

- أشرف سالم زاهر
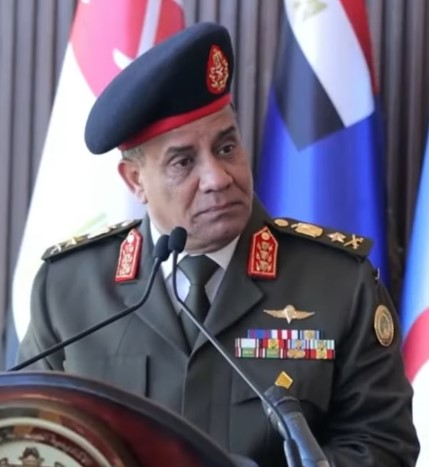
- Zaher in 2025

48th Minister of Defence
- Incumbent
- Assumed office 11 February 2026
- President: Abdel Fattah el-Sisi
- Prime Minister: Mostafa Madbouly
- Preceded by: Abdel Mageed Saqr

Director of Egyptian Military Academy
- In office 2022 – 11 February 2026
- Prime Minister: Mostafa Madbouly
- Succeeded by: Mohamed Salah Al Turky

Personal details
- Born: 18 August 1968 (age 58)
- Party: Independent
- Education: Egyptian Air Defense College

Military service
- Allegiance: Egypt
- Branch/service: Egyptian Air Defense Forces
- Years of service: 1989–present
- Rank: Lieutenant General

Ashraf Salem Zaher (Arabic: أشرف سالم زاهر; born 18 August 1968) is an Egyptian Lieutenant General who is the current minister of defense of Egypt from 11 February 2026.

== Military education ==
- Bachelor of Military Sciences
- Senior Commanders Course
- Fellowship of the National Defense College
- Bachelor of Electrical Engineering (Communications and Electrophysics)
- Master’s Degree in National Strategy

== See also ==
- Mohamed Ahmed Zaki
- Sedki Sobhy
