= Medal of Military Duty =

Military order of the Egyptian Armed Forces

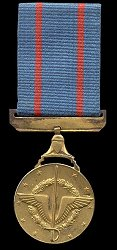
- The Medal of Military Duty
- Type: Military decoration
- Awarded for: faithful and courageous services outside of the battlefield
- Country: Egypt
- Eligibility: Military personnel only
- Status: Active
- Established: 1953

The Medal of Military Duty is a three-degree military order in Egypt.

== History ==
It is a military medal established on July 9, 1953. It is awarded to military personnel with distinguished services outside of the battlefield. A three-degree military medal, awarded for personal acts of extraordinary gallantry and intrepidity in direct. The Medal also is awarded to foreigners.

== Recipients ==
- Ibrahim El-Rifai
- Ibrahim El-Orabi
- Salah Zulfikar
- Ahmad Shafik
- Reda Hafez
- Hosni Mubarak
- Omar Suleiman
- Mohamed Hussein Tantawi
- Mohab Mamish
- Murad Muwafi
- Mahmoud Hegazy
- Salah Halabi
- Abdel Fattah el-Sisi
- Sedki Sobhy
- Ahmed Muhammad Ali
- Hatem Saber
- Hossam Khairallah
- Ahmed Ragai Attia
- Muhammad Ali Bilal
- Mamdouh Qutb
- Ahmed Mukhtar (governor)
- Kamal Mansour
- Abd al-Hamid al-Sibai
- Abdel Moneim Ahmed Ghallush
- Alaa Eldin Mohamed Fahim Fahmy
- Ali Hefzy
- Youssef Sabry Abu Talib
- Magdy Hatata
- Osama El-Gendi
- Muhammad Samir Abdel Aziz
- Abu al-Majd Haroun
- Abdel Fattah Harhour
- Muhammad Abdullah
- Salah El-Manawy
- Mohammed Aly Fahmy
- Magdy Fouad Hegazy
- Muhammad Raafat Al-Dash
- Mohamed Zaki

== See also ==
- Orders, decorations, and medals of Egypt
