= Aly Fahmy Mohammed Aly Fahmi =

Egyptian Air Force general

Aly Fahmy Mohammed Aly Fahmy

Commander of the Egyptian Air Defense Forces
- In office 17 December 2016 – 16 December 2020
- President: Abdel Fattah el-Sisi
- Preceded by: Abdul Meniem Al-Toras
- Succeeded by: Mohamed Hegazi Mannaa

Military service
- Allegiance: Egypt
- Branch/service: Egyptian Air Defense Forces
- Years of service: 1979–
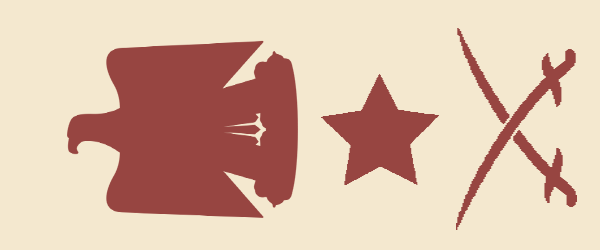
- Rank: Lieutenant General
- Unit: 22nd Air Defense Battalion (SA-3)
- Commands: SA-6 missiles Battalion; SAM Brigade; Chief of Staff of an Air defense Division; Dean of the Air Defense college Chief of Staff of the Egyptian Air Defence command

Aly Fahmy Mohammed Aly Fahmy (Arabic: علي فهمي محمد علي فهمي), is an Egyptian Army officer, born February 6, 1959, is the son of Field Marshal Mohammed Aly Fahmy, founder and former commander of the Egyptian Air Defense Forces during the October War. He was the Chief of Air Defense Forces Staff. He is currently the Commander of Air Defense Forces.

== See also ==
- Mohammed Aly Fahmy

Military offices
Preceded by Abdul Meniem Al-Toras	Commander of the Egyptian Air Defence Forces; 16 December 2016 - 16 December 2020	Current holder
