= Abdel Mageed Saqr =

Egyptian Minister of Defense (born 1955)

- عبد المجيد صقر
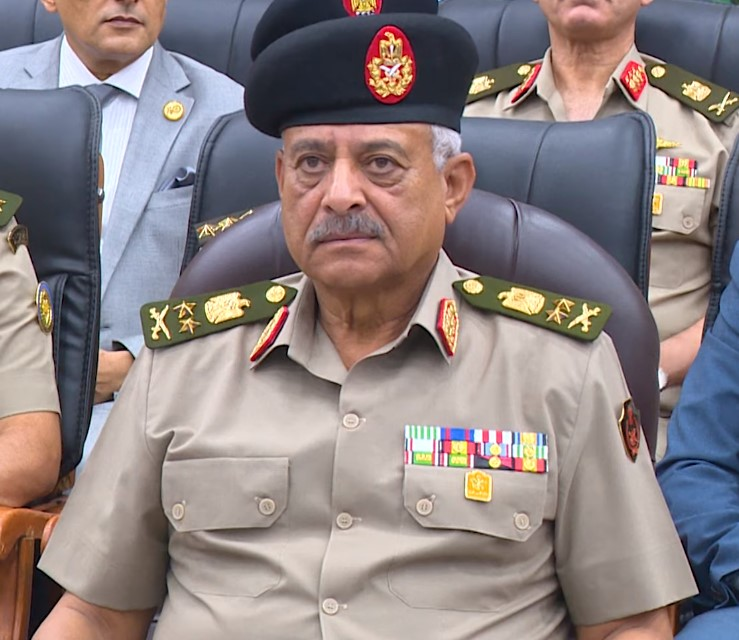
- Saqr in 2024

47th Minister of Defence
- In office 3 July 2024 – 11 February 2026
- President: Abdel Fattah el-Sisi
- Prime Minister: Mostafa Madbouly
- Preceded by: Mohamed Ahmed Zaki
- Succeeded by: Ashraf Salem Zaher

Governor of Suez
- In office 29 August 2018 – 2 July 2024
- Prime Minister: Mostafa Madbouly
- Preceded by: Ahmad Hamed
- Succeeded by: Tariq Al-Shazly

Personal details
- Born: 27 June 1955 (age 71)
- Party: Independent

Military service
- Allegiance: Egypt
- Branch/service: Egyptian Army
- Years of service: 1977–present
- Rank: General

Abdel Mageed Ahmed Abdel Mageed Saqr (Arabic: عبد المجيد أحمد عبد المجيد صقر; born 27 June 1955) is an Egyptian general who was the minister of defense of Egypt from 2 July 2024 to 11 February 2026.

== Military education ==
- Bachelor's degree of military sciences from Egyptian Military College.
- All mandatory courses for the artillery corps.
- Master's degree in military sciences from the Command and Staff College.
- Fellowship of the Higher War College of the Military Academy for Postgraduate and Strategic Studies.

== See also ==
- Sedki Sobhy.
- Hussein Tantawy.
