= Magdy Fouad Hegazy =

Magdy Hegazy مجدي حجازي

Chief of Air Defence Staff
- President: Abdel Fattah el-Sisi

Personal details
- Born: 6 August 1953 (age 72)

Military service
- Allegiance: Egypt
- Branch/service: Air Defense Forces
- Years of service: 1973 – present

Magdy Fouad Hegazy (Arabic: مجدي فؤاد حجازي; born 6 August 1953) is the Egyptian former governor of Aswan Governorate, Egypt. He was appointed by President Abdel Fattah el-Sisi on December 26, 2015. He was formerly Chief of Air Defense Staff the Egyptian Air Defense Command. General Hegazy studied in the Air Defense College and graduated on September 1, 1973, and served as a platoon radar officer of an SA-6 platoon. He held many important positions during his career, including leading an air defense battalion, a brigade, a military region and a training course. Hegazy has been awarded several medals and decorations such as the Longevity & Exemplary Medal and the Distinguished Service Decoration.

== Military education ==
- The Main Course
- Brigades Specialized leader Course
- Battalions Specialized leader Course
- Main Staff Course
- Higher War Course number 23
- Higher Course for Higher Military Leaders number 23

== Medals and decorations ==
- October 1973 Victory Medal
- October War Exemplary Service Leadership medal
- Longevity and Exemplary Medal
- Military Duty 3rd level decoration
- Military Duty 1st level decoration
- Distinguished Service Decoration
- 25 January Medal
