= Abdul Meniem Al-Toras =

Egyptian Air Force general

- عبد المنعم التراس
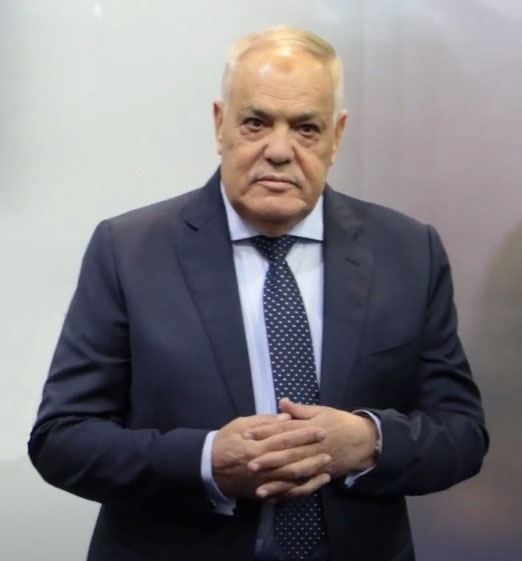

Commander of the Egyptian Air Defense Forces
- In office 14 ِAugust 2012 – 17 December 2016
- President: Mohamed Morsi; Abdel Fattah el-Sisi
- Preceded by: Abd El Aziz Seif-Eldeen
- Succeeded by: Ali Fahmi

Military service
- Allegiance: Egypt
- Branch/service: Egyptian Air Defense Forces
- Years of service: 1972–present
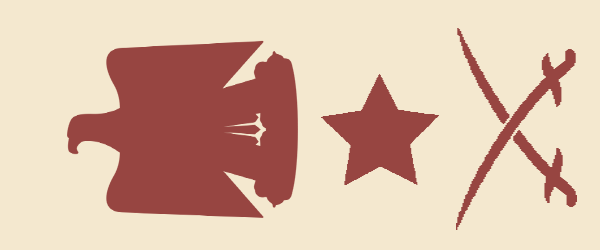
- Rank: Lieutenant General
- Unit: 22nd Air Defense Battalion (SA-3)
- Commands: SA-6 missiles Battalion; SAM Brigade; Chief of Staff of an Air defense Division; Dean of the Air Defense college Chief of Staff of the Egyptian Air Defence command
- Battles/wars: Yom Kippur War

Abdul Meniem Al-Toras (Arabic: عبد المنعم التراس) is the former Commander of the Egyptian Air Defense Forces. He graduated from the Air Defense college in 1972, and saw action in the Yom Kippur War. He is the first commander-in-chief of the Egyptian Air Defense Forces who graduated from the Air Defense College and was commissioned in the Air Defense Forces as a separated military branch.

All previous commanders-in-chief were graduates of the Army academy and were commissioned in Army units, in fact many of them were commissioned in non-AD units like Armour, Artillery, Infantry, and Signals. He held most of the notable commands in the Egyptian Air Defense. On 14 August 2012 President Mohamed Morsi Appointed him as the new Commander in Chief of the Egyptian Air Defence command after he dismissed Lt. General Abd El Aziz Seif-Eldeen. He is a member of the Supreme Council of the Armed Forces, which was reorganized in September 2012.

== Military education ==
- The Main Course
- Brigades fire leader Course
- Battalions fire leader Course
- Main Staff Course
- War Course, Fellowship of the Higher War College, Nasser's Military Sciences Academy

== Medals and decorations ==
- Sinai Liberation Medal
- Longevity and Exemplary Medal
- Distinguished Service Decoration
- Training medal
- 6th of October Medal
- October Fighters Medal
- The 20th anniversary of the revolution Medal
- The 50th anniversary of the revolution Medal
- Air Defense's Day Medal
- Silver Jubilee of October war's victory Medal

Military offices
Preceded by Abd El Aziz Seif-Eldeen	Commander of the Egyptian Air Defense Forces; 14 ِAugust 2012–16 December 2016	Succeeded by Aly Fahmy Mohammed Aly Fahmi
