= Egyptian Air Defense Forces =

Air defence branch of Egypt's military

- قوات الدفاع الجوي المصري
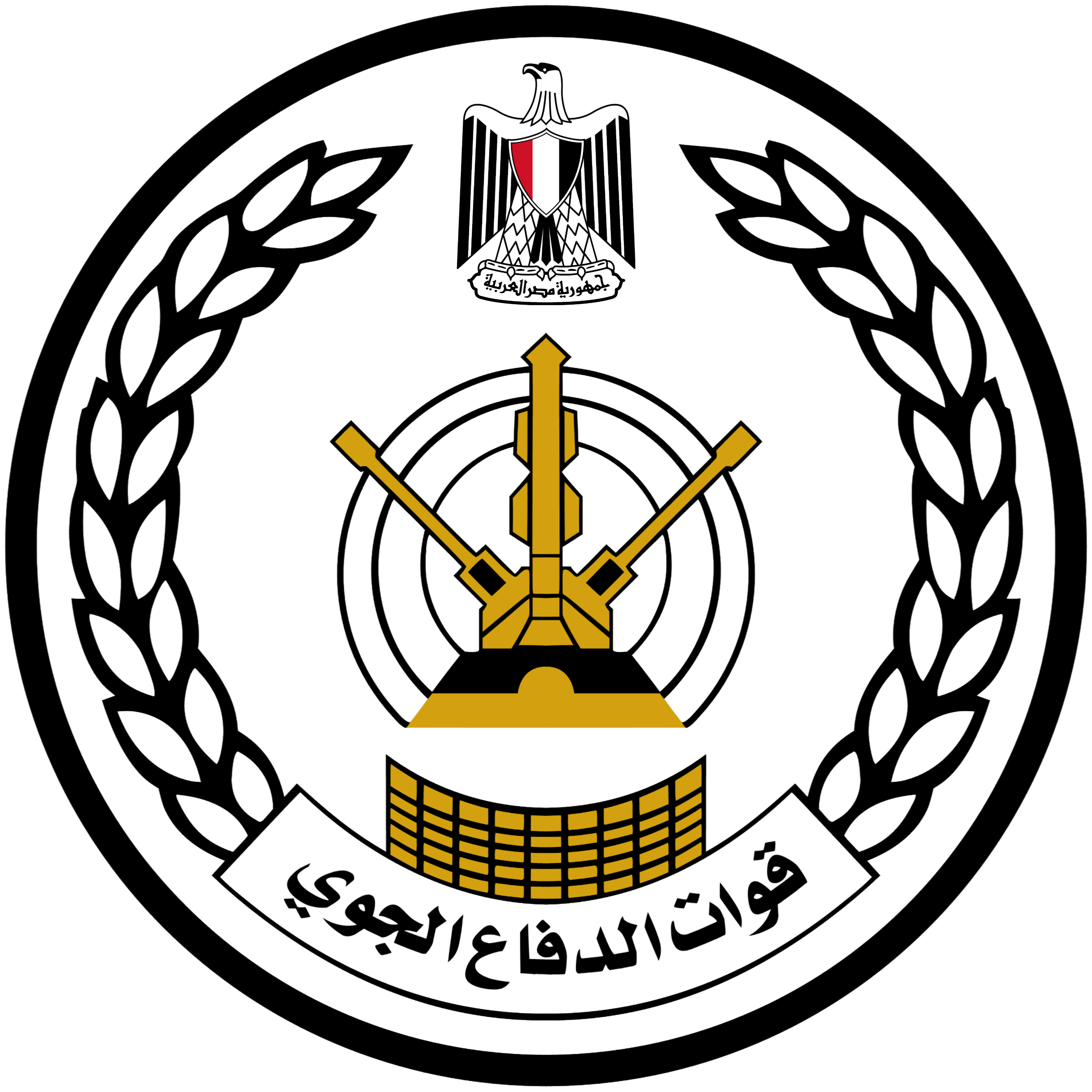
- Emblem of the Egyptian Air Defense Forces
- Founded: 1968, 58 years ago (as separate branch); 1938–1968 (part of Artillery Corps)
- Country: Egypt
- Role: Anti-aircraft warfare
- Size: 10,000
- Part of: Egyptian Armed Forces
- Garrison/HQ: The Octagon, The New Capital, Egypt
- Nickname: حصن السماء (Sky Fortress)
- Mottos: إيمان, عزم, مجد (Faith, Will, Glory)
- March: سلاح الدفاع يرد المغير يصد العدو يلبي النداء
- Anniversaries: 30 June
- Engagements: World War II; 1948 Arab–Israeli War; Suez Crisis; North Yemen Civil War; Six-Day War; War of Attrition; Yom Kippur War; Gulf War

Commanders
- Supreme, commander: President Abdel Fattah El-Sisi
- Minister of Defense: Lieutenant general Ashraf Salem Zaher
- Chief of Staff of the Armed Forces: Lieutenant general Ahmed Fathy Khalifa
- Commander of the EADF: Major General Ahmed Ali Ibrahim
- Chief of Staff of the EADF: Major General Saleh El-Hennawi

Insignia
- Flag
- Insignia: Egyptian Army ranks

The Egyptian Air Defence Forces (EADF) (Arabic: قوات الدفاع الجوي, romanized: Quwwat Al-Difa' Al-Gawwi) is the Anti-aircraft warfare branch of the Egyptian Armed Forces. It is responsible for protecting the Egyptian airspace against any hostile air attacks. The EADF was established in accordance with the presidential decree issued on 1 February 1968, which established the Air Defence Forces as the fourth branch, next to the Navy, Egyptian Ground Forces, and Egyptian Air Force.

From 1938 onwards air defence forces had been part of the artillery and under the operation command of the Air Force. Egypt has a modern system of air defence armament, which is divided between anti-aircraft missiles long, medium and short-range anti-aircraft artillery systems and early warning radars. Both Western and Soviet bloc countries have supplied equipment.

Officers are mostly graduates of the Egyptian Air Defense Academy, located in Alexandria. The forces' headquarters is located in Cairo, and currently the Commander in Chief is Major General Ahmed Ali Ibrahim and the Chief of Staff is Staff Major General Saleh El-Hennawi. In 2023, the International Institute for Strategic Studies estimated that the EADF consisted of 80,000 active personnel and 70,000 reserve personnel.

== Foundation ==
After role of aviation expanded during and after the First World War, Egypt saw at that time the formation of a limited force of anti-aircraft artillery enabling it to defend its main cities and economic centers in Cairo and Alexandria. Egypt began to form the first nucleus of the anti-aircraft artillery In 1938, the forces consisted of two regiments of anti-aircraft armed with 3-inch anti-aircraft guns. Since these cannons could not engage at night, as radar had not yet arrived, two searchlight regiments were formed, which were supplied with 90-cm searchlights. Anti-aircraft artillery, with its two sections, became artillery and searchlights, a branch of artillery corps.

== World War II ==
Anti-aircraft artillery entered the battles of the Second World War is still in the cradle of training and development. The air defence battles were fought for the densely populated cities, with Cairo, Alexandria, Port Said and Suez specially important. The first quarter of 1939 was taken to confront the attacks of the Italian and German Air Forces around these cities, and due to the poor quality of the attacking aircraft in addition to the weak level of pilots, Italian aircraft were unable to carry out any successful missions against Egyptian cities except for some limited strikes on residential areas, offset by the shooting-down of a number of aircraft. In June 1941 the German Air Force fiercely developed its attacks on Egypt to cause a moral and material impact for the benefit of the Axis powers, resulting in huge losses of lives and property and did not succeed in achieving actual casualties with military targets, facilities and ports due to the fierce resistance of the anti-aircraft artillery that forced the invading planes to drop their bombs away from vital goals. These continuous attacks enabled the anti-aircraft artillery forces to gain practical experience and identify the tactical shortcomings and work to solve them, so they replaced the 3-inch anti-aircraft guns with their 3.7-inch counterpart with their fixed and mobile types.

Further tactical developments were also made, creating a curtain of intensive fire at a certain point along the plane's flightpath before it reaches the bomb-dropping line, and all its cannons are fired at a specific time that is set according to the speed of the attacking plane and the distance that was discovered, which resulted in good results at that time due to the speed Ltd. limited the quality of the aircraft at that time and the ingenuity of the Egyptian soldiers in the management of the hitting fire. In view of this success and the great effort made by the anti-aircraft artillery officers, the leadership rewarded them by sending them to scientific missions to gain more knowledge and skills at the British Middle East anti-aircraft artillery school.

== 1948 Arab-Israeli war ==
After the Arab leaders announced the intervention of the Arab armies to liberate Palestine from the Zionist occupation, several Egyptian army units were ordered at the beginning of May 1948 to go to the eastern borders to participate in the war. A number of anti-aircraft artillery units of small and medium calibers were also dispatched, whose mission was providing protection to ground units against any air attacks by the Israeli forces. Anti-aircraft artillery was successfully able to repel attacks from Israeli aircraft which at the time had limited capabilities and were not able to influence the course of the battles, and due to the losses inflicted on the Israeli air force, anti-aircraft artillery units were able to provide aid to the ground forces in tasks other than air protection, and it was used as anti-tank artillery and as a field artillery, especially in the bombardment of fortified bunkers and Zionist settlements' water tanks.

== Suez Crisis ==
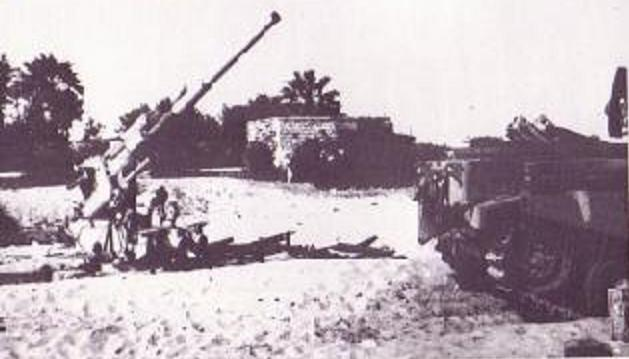
An Egyptian anti-aircraft cannon during the 1956 Suez Crisis

Anti-aircraft guns were one of the Egyptian military strengths of World War II. After the 1952 Coup d'état, further development of anti-aircraft forces was part of Egypt's military buildup.

In mid-1956 the formation of a decent number of units of light and medium anti-aircraft artillery began. Following the outbreak of the Suez Crisis, the Egyptian anti-aircraft artillery forces had to face a large number of modern French and British aircraft, which Egypt's old artillery systems that date back to World War II were no match for, to the point that coalition aircraft were strafing Egyptian soldiers and vehicles with their cannons at low altitudes. Nonetheless, the Egyptian AAA units succeeded at inflicting heavy losses on coalition aircraft, despite the lack of training and outdated equipment they managed to shoot down several aircraft over Cairo, Alexandria and Sinai, and in Suez the Egyptians set up a trap for coalition aircraft that tried to bomb the bridges that link the Sinai Nile Valley and the artillery units managed to foil their attempt at destroying the bridges. And in Port Said the artillery forces managed to hold out for several days against intensive air attacks.

== Six-Day War ==
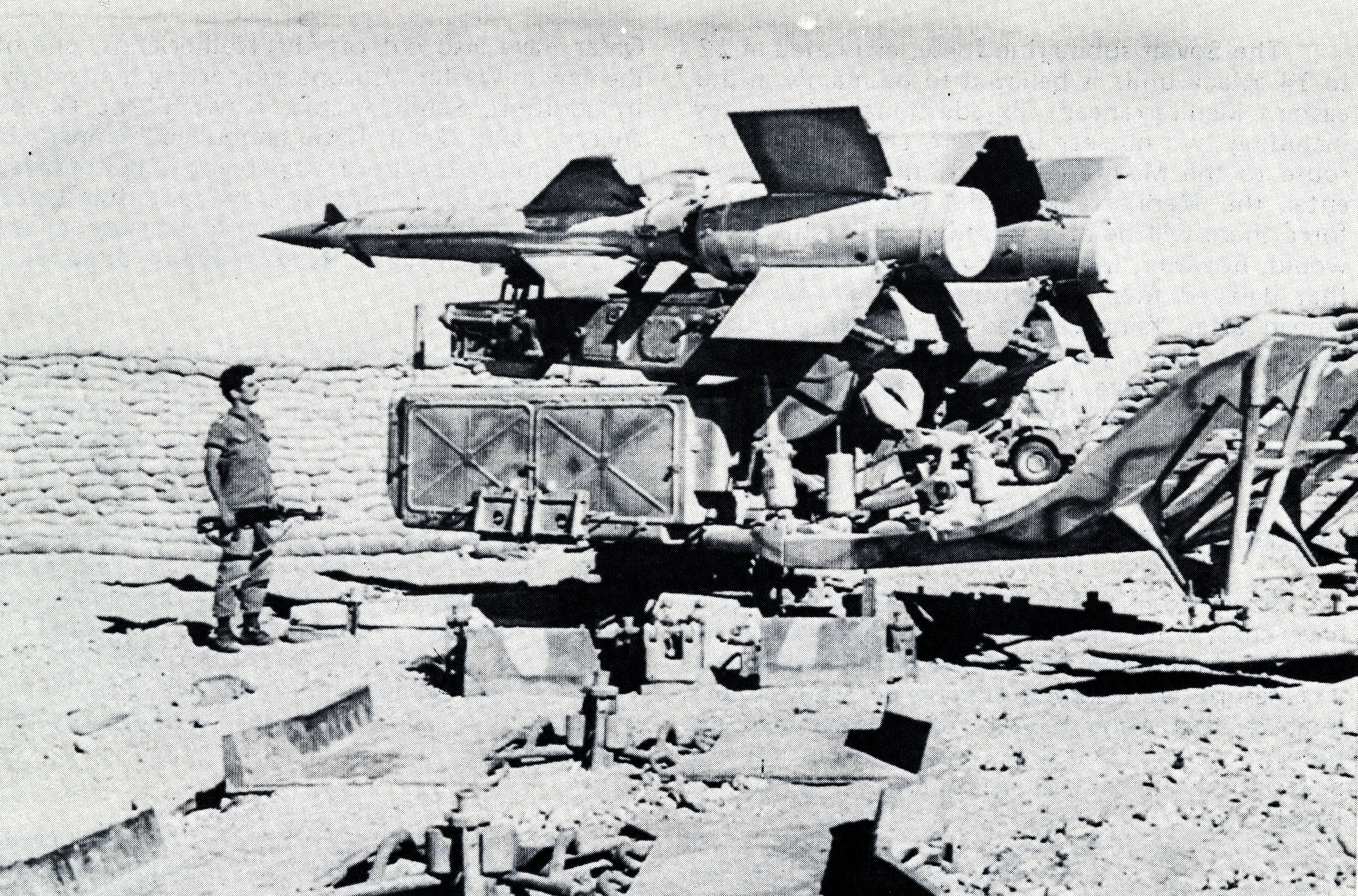
Egyptian missile site captured by Israelis during the Arab-Israeli War.

On 5 June 1967, the Israeli Air Force began air strikes on the Egyptian front in Sinai, taking advantage of the shortcomings in the Egyptian air defence. The Israeli Air Force only faced little resistance from obsolete anti-aircraft artillery systems, which were not suitable for dealing with modern, maneuverable high speed aircraft, resulting in a painful loss of life, land and equipment.

== War of Attrition ==
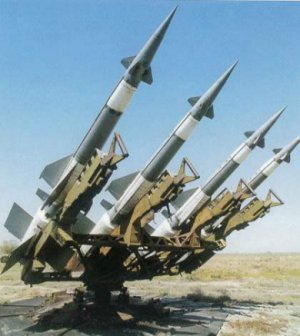
Soviet/Egyptian S-125 anti-aircraft type missiles in the Suez Canal vicinity

Following the 1967 war, Egypt took the decision to reorganise and develop its armed forces, and included those decisions on Presidential Decree No. 199 issued on 1 February 1968, establishment of the Egyptian Air Defence Forces as a separate branch, standing alone, avoiding the previous weapons and units scattered among departments. With artillery and rocket troops were tracing artillery management units and radar warning and operations centers used to belong to the air force and the control points were given follow the Border guard.

And confined all the means and weapons and equipment anti-air attacks under one command to ensure coordination and unification of responsibility and in order to achieve success, and in the 23 June 1969 was appointed Lieutenant General Mohammed Aly Fahmy as the first EADF commander, who took it upon himself to reorganise the forces and the management of cadres and personnel training and increase their level of tactical and tactical mission and technical, with a broad technological base capable of accommodating modern air defence weapons as soon as possible in order to deprive Israel of air superiority. Near the end of the war, on June 30, 1970, Egyptian SAM units shot down four IAF aircraft (2 Skyhawks & 2 Phantoms) from this day to August 6 the EADF shot down 12 IAF aircraft (mostly Phantoms) that this week was nicknamed "Week of the falling Phantoms" this event brought an end to the war and start of Roger's peace negotiations. June 30 has become the EADF anniversary since then.

=== Early Warning Network ===
The establishment of the EADF required the establishment of a long-range early warning network to detect any hostile aircraft approaching the Egyptian airspace and provide enough time to warn the air defence and artillery positions, and secure the necessary critical information. This required a large and diverse number of warning systems to be used in full cooperation and coordination, and strengthening it with a network of visual observation points and equipping it with a flexible and continuous transportation network, providing steadfastness to it so that the enemy cannot destroy any part of it or blind it by means of electronic warfare.

== SAM Wall ==
The General Command of the Armed Forces began to support the EADF with modern types of weapons, electronic equipment and anti-aircraft missiles that fly at low altitudes, and the EADF continued to establish sites fortified with the expansion of the country from Aswan to Alexandria and from Port Said to Matrouh, and the state devoted its material and engineering capabilities to build these sites in the shortest possible time, with the preparation of roads and the establishment of telecommunications. The Israeli leadership focused its air strikes on the canal line with the aim of sticking to the ceasefire lines and tightening its grip on that front, and identified the tasks of the Israeli Air Force in destroying Egyptian military sites, especially field artillery shelters, and preventing the establishment of new anti-aircraft missile bases in the channel area, and isolating important areas on The Egyptian front and paralyze any moves aimed at introducing or mobilizing forces in the region. To counter these concentrated air strikes, the EADF introduced anti-aircraft missiles to the canal area, and constructed anti-aircraft missile walls using the slow and steady crawl method by establishing fortifications of each domain and occupying it under the protection of its back-range. Other ranges extend to the middle of the distance between Cairo and the front of the canal, and the necessary field fortifications were established for 24 missile bases. Implementing a plan to deceive and absorb Israeli air strikes by creating structural sites. On the morning of June 30, 1970, Israeli warplanes that chanted Egyptian missiles that inflicted heavy losses on the Israeli Air Force were surprised, so that the rocket wall became a reality, and Israeli Prime Minister Golda Meir stated, In exchange for those great losses that occurred, Israel sought a ceasefire, but in the few hours leading up to the implementation of the ceasefire on August 8, 1970, the EADF managed to complete the missile wall on its final image.

=== October War ===
After the Six day war, Egypt managed to form a huge AA Belt of one division placing dozens of SAM battalions (Six missiles each) on the west bank of the Suez Canal. The plan was to repel the anticipated Israeli Air Force Counterattack on the Egyptian forces during Operation Badr using ambush tactics, where between 6 and 8 October alone, around 50 IAF aircraft were shot down. By October 8, the Israeli Air Force warned all their pilots not to fly over Port Said due to the density and danger posed by the Egyptian SAM sites.

=== After the October war ===
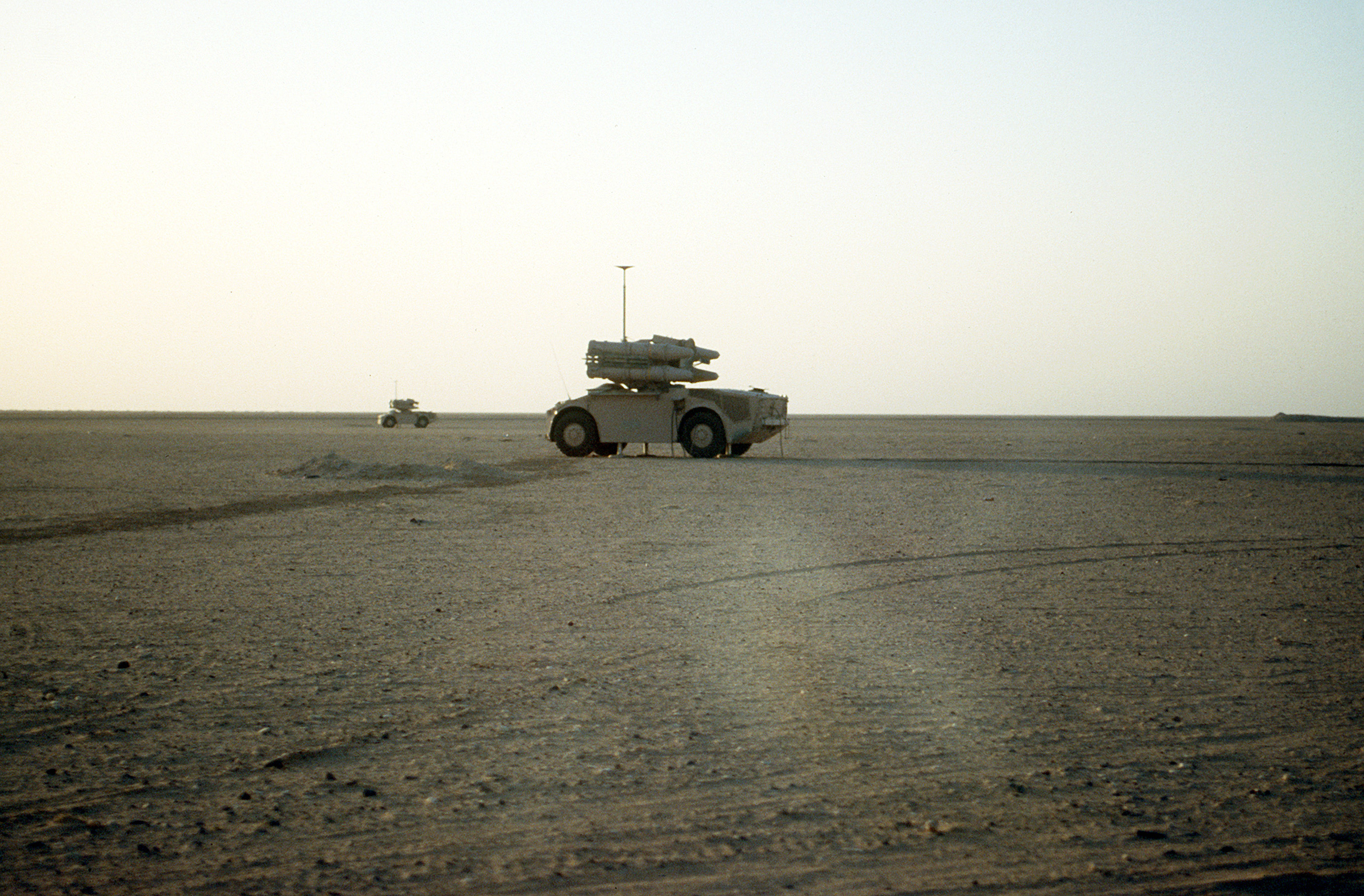
An Egyptian Crotale P4R low-altitude surface-to-air missile system is positioned in the desert during Gulf War.

In 1970 the Egyptian Air Defence Force consisted of four divisions:

- 5th Air Defence Division placed in Cairo. Sami Hafez Anan reportedly commanded this division in 1996–98.
- 8th Air Defence Division placed in Abu Suwayr. Division "crawled forward" in mid 1972 or 1973 to establish AA belt on banks of the Canal. (See Dani Asher, The Egyptian Strategy for the Yom Kippur War, 32)
- 10th Air Defence Division placed in Alexandria.
- 12th Air Defence Division placed in Aswan.

The current structure of the EADF:

  - 5th Air Defence Division
  - 8th Air Defence Division
  - 10th Air Defence Division
  - 12th Air Defence Division
  - 15th Air Defence Division
  - Independent brigades:
    - 103rd Air Defence Brigade
    - 104th Air Defence Brigade

In 1989 a large share of the EADF's equipment was imported from the Soviet Union. As of 1989, the most modern air defence weapons were the 108 medium altitude I-Hawk SAMs acquired from the United States beginning in 1982. These weapons were supplemented by 400 older Soviet-made S-75 Dvina (SA-2) SAMs with a slant range of forty to fifty kilometers and about 240 SA-3s, which provided shorter-range defense against low-flying targets. A British firm helped the ADF modernize the SA-2s. In addition, Egypt was producing its own SAM, the Tayir as Sabah, based on the design of the SA-2. The ADF had mounted sixty Soviet 2K12 Kub SAMs on tracked vehicles as tactical launchers. Sixteen tracked vehicles provided mobile launching platforms for its fifty French-manufactured Crotale SAM launchers. Egypt was also introducing its own composite gun-missile-radar system known as Amoun (Skyguard), integrating radar-guided twin 23mm guns with Sparrow and Egyptian Ayn as Saqr SAMs.

By the end of 2008, with the support of the United States (through Foreign Military Financing and private contractors and firms) all missile, radar, observation posts, command and control systems were to be linked into a complex multi-level, national computerized early-warning air defence command and control system via modified EC-130H Hercules (modified to AWACS-like specifications) transport aircraft, EW AWACS E-2C Hawkeye 2000, EW ECM Beechcraft 1900 ELINT, and an underground sheltered-reinforced fiber-optic network.

In 2014 the International Institute for Strategic Studies estimated that the EADF consisted of 30,000 officers & soldiers plus 50,000 conscripts.

== Commanders of the Egyptian Air Defence Force ==
- June 1969 to January 1975 Field Marshal Mohammed Aly Fahmy
- January 1975 to December 1979 Lieutenant general Helmy Afify Abd El-Bar
- December 1979 to January 1986 Lieutenant general El-Said Hamdy
- January 1986 to October 1987 Lieutenant general Adel Khalil
- October 1987 to December 1990 Lieutenant general Mostafa El-Shazly
- December 1990 to April 1993 Lieutenant general Zaher Abd El-Rahman
- April 1993 to April 1996 Lieutenant general Ahmed Abou Talib
- April 1996 to 19 July 2001 Lieutenant general Mohammed Elshahat
- 19 July 2001 to 30 October 2006 Lieutenant general Sami Hafez Anan
- 30 October 2006 to 12 August 2012 Lieutenant general Abd El Aziz Seif-Eldeen
- 12 August 2012 to present Lieutenant general Abdul Meniem Al-Toras
- 16 December 2020 to present Major general Mohamed Hegazy Abdul Mawgoud

== Weaponry and equipment ==
The EADF is undergoing extensive modernization with budgetary constraints being the only hindrance. Currently, it is believed to possess the following weaponry:

=== Regional/strategic perimeter-level SAMs ===
- Modernized MIM-23 HAWK "Improved HAWK" missile: 18 batteries (6 SP units per battery, 3 missiles per unit plus 2 reloads each) (medium/high-altitude, medium-range SAM)
- 9K37 Buk-M1 missile: 10 batteries purchased in 2005. Each battery is equipped with 4 SP TEL units with 4 missiles each, with 1 reload as reserve.
- 9M317 Buk-M2 missile: Purchased in 2013. [in service with unspecified number, probably 4-5 batteries]. Each battery is equipped with 4 SP TEL units with 4 missiles each, with 1 reload as reserve.
- Modernized SA-3 2M Pechora missile: 43 Batteries (each with 2 stationary units, 4 missiles per stationary unit plus 1 reload each) (low/medium-altitude, medium-range SAM)
- Indigenous Tayer el-sabah (Morning Bird) (reverse-engineered and modernized SA-2 Guideline S-75 Dvina missile: 40 batteries (6 single units per Battery, 2 reloads each) (medium/high-altitude, long-range SAM)

=== Army corps and division-level SAM ===
- 9K331 Tor-M1 missile : 16 firing units
- 9K332 Tor-M2 :Purchased in 2013 [in service with unspecified numbers]
- Modernized SA-3 2M Pechora missile: 10 Batteries (6 SP units per Battery, 2 missiles per S/P unit plus 1 reload per unit) (Low/Medium Altitude, Medium Range SAM)
- Modernized SA-6 Gainful missile: 14 Batteries (6 SP units per Battery, 3 missiles per unit plus 1 reload each)(Low/Medium Altitude, Medium Range SAM)

=== Brigade and battalion-level SAM ===
- Skyguard "Amoun" anti-aircraft system AIM-7 Sparrow missile: 72 Units " 18 battalion (3 units each) + 4 batteries for training " (2 4-cell Sparrow missile launchers and 2 Oerlikon GDF-005 twin 35mm guns with one Skyguard Fire Control System per battery, 1 reload per launcher) (Original Italian system is equipped with Aspide missile system, substituted with AIM-7 Sparrow missiles with the EADF).
- Modernized Crotale NG missile: 16 Batteries (9 units per Battery, 4 Missiles per unit plus 2 reloads each)(SP Low/Medium Altitude, Short Range SAM)
- MIM-72/M48 Chaparral low-altitude SAM AIM-9 "Sidewinder": 86 SP units (4 Missiles per unit plus 2 reloads each)(SP Low Altitude, Short Range SAM)
- AN/TWQ-1 Avenger : 75 Batteries (4/8 ready-to-fire FIM-92 Stinger missiles + .50 caliber machine gun with an electronic trigger that can be fired from both the Remote Control Unit located in the drivers cab, and from the Avenger turret. Provides mobile, short-range air defence for ground units against cruise missiles, unmanned aerial vehicles, low-flying fixed-wing aircraft, and helicopters.)

=== Air Defense ===
Name	Image	Origin	Type	Variant	Quantity	Notes
S-300		Russia	Long Range Air Defence	S-300VM (SA-23)	4 Battalions	Preparation to receive the S-300VM were under way in November 2014 First components delivered in March 2015. AA Range = 200 km, AA Ceiling = 30 km, Speed = Mach 5, ABM Range = 40 km.
HQ-9BE		China	Long Range Air Defence	HQ-9BE FD-2000B	4 Batteries	Acquired in 2025
NASAMS		United States	Medium Range Air Defence	NASAMS-3	4 AN/MPQ-64F1 radars	The U.S. approved the sale of 4 NASAMS batteries to Egypt in July 2025, enhancing air defense capabilities and regional deterrence.
IRIS-T SLM, SLX, SLS		Germany	Medium Range Air Defence	IRIS-T SLM, SLX, SLS	7 SLM Systems, 10 SLX systems, 6 SLS systems	The German government approved the sale of 7 IRIS-T SLM tactical medium range AD systems to Egypt in September 2018.
Volga		Soviet Union	Medium Range Air Defence	Tayer el-Sabah; SA-2	100	100 units were delivered by USSR from 1970 to 1972 for use in the Yom Kippur War. The Egyptians were impressed by the system's performance and acquired a local production license from the USSR. AA Range = 45 km, AA Ceiling = 25 km, Speed = Mach 3.5, ABM = none
Buk		Soviet Union	Medium Range Air Defence	M1-2; M2 (SA-17); M3		The Buk-M2 was not previously known to be in Egyptian service until it was revealed in a video of an air defence exercise released on 2 November 2014 by the MoD. AA Range = 45 km, AA Ceiling = 14 km, Speed = Mach 3.0
MIM-23 Hawk		United States	Medium Range Air Defence	Phase III	62	On 25 February 2014, Egypt ordered new 186 rocket motors to extend the life of their Hawk batteries. Since there are 3 missiles per launch unit then one can deduce that Egypt plans to maintain 62 launcher systems. AA Range = 50 km, AA Ceiling = 14 km, Speed = Mach 2.4
Pechora 2M		Soviet Union	Medium Range Air Defence	2M (SA-3)	70	Originally Egypt received 200 units from USSR between 1970 and 1972 and they were used extensively during the Yom Kippur War. These units aged and some of them were upgraded to Pechora-2M version. As of December 2008, 70 Pechora-2M upgraded ramp-launched missiles had been ordered by Egypt. AA Range = 35 km, AA Ceiling = 18 km, Speed = Mach 3.1
Kub		Soviet Union	Medium Range Air Defence	SA-6	56	Purchased from the Soviet Union after the disastrous 6 Day War and was used to great effect in the Yom Kippur War virtually denying the entire air space of Egypt to Israel. The system was modernized and is still in service. AA Range = 24 km, AA Ceiling = 14 km, Speed = Mach 2.8
Tor		Soviet Union	Short Range Air Defence	M1; M2 (SA-15)	16	16 units were purchased from Russia. The Tor-M2 was not previously known to be in Egyptian service until it was revealed in a video of an air defence exercise released on 2 November 2014 by the MoD. AA Range = 12 km, AA Ceiling = 6 km, Speed = Mach 2.5
AN/TWQ-1 Avenger		United States	Short Range Air Defence	75	Egypt originally ordered 50 units, but in 2006 it chose to order a further 25 units which all were delivered by September 2008. AA Range = 8 km, AA Ceiling = 8 km, Speed = Mach 2.2	
Crotale		France	Short Range Air Defence	VT-1	36	Purchased from France in 1980. AA Range = 11 km, AA Ceiling = 6 km, Speed = 3.53
MIM-72 Chaparral		United States	Short Range Air Defence	MIM-72C	280	Purchased from U.S. stock in 1987,2014; AA Range = 9 km, AA Ceiling = 4 km, Speed = Mach 1.5
Strela-1		Soviet Union	Short Range Air Defence	SA-9	20	AA Range = 4.2 km, AA Ceiling = 3.5 km, Speed = Mach 1.8
Ayn al-Saqr		Soviet Union; Egypt	MANPADS			
FIM-92 Stinger		United States	MANPADS			
9K38 Igla		Soviet Union	MANPADS	9K38 / 9K338 Igla		
M113 AA		United States	SPAAG	Nile 23; Sinai 23; M163 VADS		Upgraded version of the ZU-23-2 twin 23 mm self-propelled anti-aircraft guns radar guided (148) with Sakr Eye SAM 2X2 on M113, Upgraded version of the ZU-23-2 twin 23 mm self-propelled anti-aircraft guns radar guided with Stinger SAM (3X2) (72) on M113, 108
Shilka		Soviet Union	SPAAG			350 in 1995. 330 were delivered from USSR, also a new contract was signed with Russia in 2005.
ZSU-57-2		Soviet Union	SPAAG		40	100 ordered in 1960 from Soviet Union and delivered between 1961 and 1962, with 40 remaining in storage today.
M53/59 Praga		Czechoslovakia	SPAAG			
Skyguard Amoun		Switzerland	Towed AA/SHORAD (35 mm)	Amoun	36	72 GDF units used with one Skyguard unit and two Sparrow SAM launchers per battery
M167 VADS		United States	Towed AA (20 mm)		72	
ZPU		Soviet Union	Towed AA (14.5 mm)		200	
ZU-23-2		Soviet Union	Towed AA (23 mm)		280	280 as Nile 23 and Sinai 23, and 650 upgraded with radar guidance
61-K		Soviet Union	Towed AA (37 mm)		200	700
S-60		Soviet Union	Towed AA (57 mm)		200	600
52-K		Soviet Union	Towed AA (85 mm)			400
KS-19		Soviet Union	Towed AA (100 mm)			200
KS-30		Soviet Union	Towed AA (130 mm)			120

=== Future equipment ===
System	Image	Origin	Number	Comment
Air defence
S-400 Triumf		Russia	N/A	Egypt has expressed its interest in buying S-400 systems.

== Egyptian Air Defence Radars ==
| Fan Song | PRV-11 | P-12 radar | Straight Flush | P-19 radar | P-30 radar | P-40 radar | Borisoglebsk-2 | Krasukha | Pelena-1 | R-330Zh Zhitel | Repellent-1 | Podlet-1K Radar | Barnaul-T | KTM Kineto Tracking Mount Model 433 | Nebo-SVU | Aistyonok | 1L121-E | 67N6E | Ranzhir | Zoopark-1 | Polyana-D4 | SNR-125 | P-15 radar | Skyguard | Fire Dome | Snow Drift | Scrum Half | engagement | post 3m | ESR-32B | ESR-32A | EADS 3D TRS | AN/SPS-49 | AN/SPS-40 | AN/SPS-67 | JYL-1 Radar | Selex RAT-31DL | Polyana-D4 | AN/MPQ-50 | AN/MPQ-62 | AN/SPS-48 | AN/MPQ-46 | AN/TPS-59 | AN/TPS-77 | AN/MPQ-64 | AN/MPQ-53 | AN/MPQ-65 | AN/VRC-92 | AN/APQ-164 | AN/APY-9 | flat box | 1RL33 | RA-20S | P-11 radar | P-14 radar | P-18 radar | P-35 radar | P-40 radar | Kasta 2E | HT-233 | Type 120 Radar | Type 305A Radar | TIGER | TRS-2100 Tiger | Lion System | JY-9 Radar | YLC-6 Radar | JLP-40 Radar | JLG-43 Radar | AN/TPS-43 | Ground Master 400 | Protivnik-GE | AN/TPS-63 | Giraffe radar | Avtobaza | Nebo-M | JY-26 Radar | 96L6E | 64N6 | Commander SL | Repellent-1 | Rezonans NE3

== Beret ==
Beret

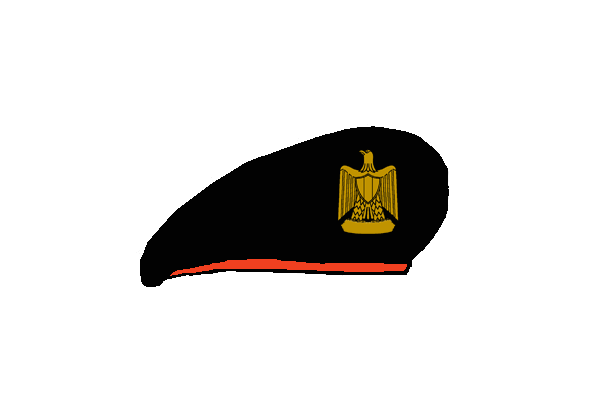
Officer

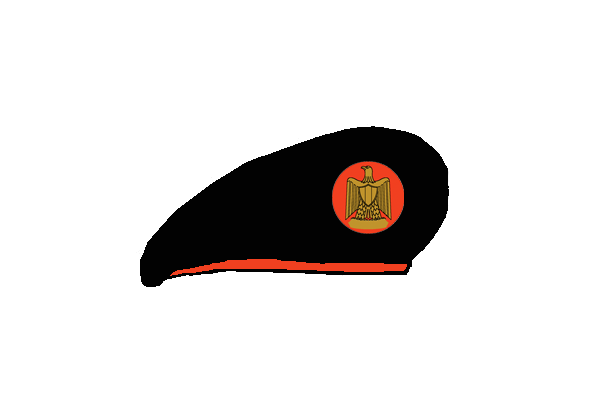
Brigadier General

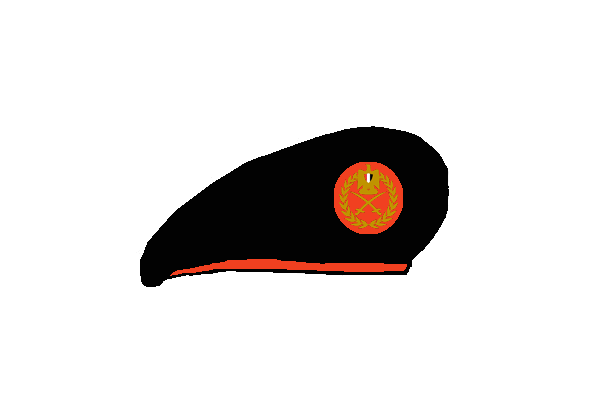
General

== Ranks ==
Commissioned officer ranks

Rank group	General / flag officers			Senior officers			Junior officers
Egyptian Air Defense Forces
Egyptian Air Defense Forces	فريق; Fariq	لواء; Liwa	عميد; Amid	عقيد; Aqid	مقدم; Muqaddam	رائد; Ra'id	نقيب; Naqib	ملازم أول; Mulazim awwal	ملازم; Mulazim

Other ranks

Rank group	Senior NCOs				Junior NCOs	Enlisted
Egyptian Air Defense Forces
Egyptian Air Defense Forces	مساعد أول; Mosa'id awwal	مساعد; Mosa'id	رقيب أول; Raqib awwal	رقيب; Raqib	عريف 'arif	جندي; Jundi
