= JLG =

JLG may refer to:

- Jalgaon Airport, Jalgaon, India, IATA airport code
- Jean-Luc Godard, French film-maker, or his autobiographical film JLG/JLG, autoportrait de décembre
- Jean-Louis Gassée, founder of Be Inc., creator of BeOS, and an executive at Apple Computer from 1981 to 1990
- JLG Industries, American manufacturer of high-level access equipment
- JLG-43 Radar, height-finding radar
- Jet Lag Gemini, American rock band
- Jive Label Group
- Juan Luis Guerra, a Grammy-winning Dominican singer, songwriter, and producer who has sold over 30 million records worldwide.
- Janeese Lewis George, Washington, DC politician and activist.
