= Mohamed Hegazy Abdul Mawgoud =

Egyptian lieutenant general

- Born: November 11, 1963 (age 62)
- Education: Egyptian Air Defense Academy
- Military career
- Allegiance: Egypt
- Branch: Air Defense Forces
- Rank: Lieutenant general
- Commands: Egyptian Air Defense Forces; Chief of the Air Defense; Air Defense Forces, Operation Department; 8th Air Defense Division
- Awards: Full list

Mohamed Hegazy Abdul Mawgoud (born 11 November 1963) is an Egyptian lieutenant general who is the current commander of the Egyptian Air Defense Forces. Prior to his appointment as commander of Air Defense, he served as chief of the Air Defense until December 2020.

== Biography ==
Hegazy graduated from the Egyptian Air Defense Academy in 1986. He obtained MA with military science from the Command and Staff College. He also attended Nasser Military Academy where he obtained his military courses.

=== Awards ===
- Medal of Military Duty, First and Second Class
- Long Service and Good Exemplary Medal
- The Golden Jubilee Medal of the July 23, 1952 Revolution
- The Golden Jubilee Medal of the Air Defense Forces
- Silver Jubilee Medal for October Victory
- Excellent Service Medal
- Silver Jubilee Medal for the Liberation of Sinai
- January 25 Medal
