= Mohamed Ahmed Zaki =

Egyptian general (born 1956)

- محمد أحمد زكي
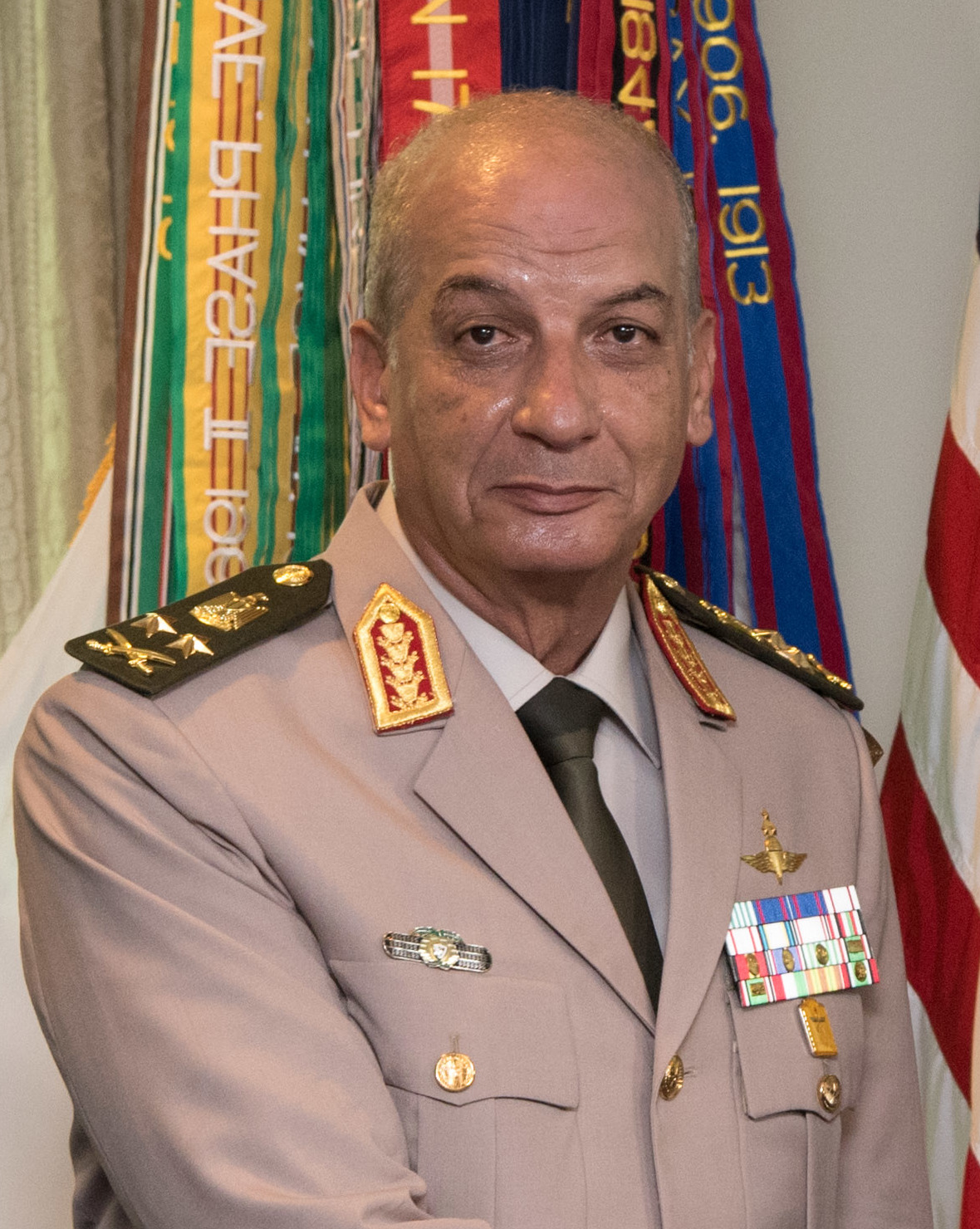
- Zaki in 2019

46th Minister of Defence
- In office 14 June 2018 – 2 July 2024
- President: Abdel Fattah el-Sisi
- Prime Minister: Mostafa Madbouly
- Preceded by: Sedki Sobhy
- Succeeded by: Abdel Mageed Saqr

Commander of the Republican Guard
- In office 12 August 2012 – 14 June 2018
- President: Mohamed Morsi; Adly Mansour (acting); Abdel Fattah el-Sisi
- Preceded by: Naguib Abdel-Salam

Commander of the Egyptian Paratroopers
- In office 18 December 2008 – 11 August 2012
- President: Hosni Mubarak; Mohamed Hussein Tantawi (acting); Mohamed Morsi

Personal details
- Born: 29 January 1956 (age 70)
- Party: Independent

Military service
- Allegiance: Egypt
- Branch/service: Egyptian Army
- Years of service: 1977–present
- Rank: Colonel general
- Battles/wars: Gulf War

Mohamed Ahmed Zaki Mohamed (Arabic: محمد أحمد زكي محمد; born 29 January 1956) is an Egyptian colonel general who was minister of defense of Egypt from June 14, 2018, to July 2, 2024. He previously held the command for the Egyptian Paratroopers from December 2008 to August 2012 and became the commander of the Republican Guard Forces until June 2018.

Zaki was sworn in on 14 June 2018, succeeding Sedki Sobhy as the minister of defense. His appointment may have been a reward for arresting former Egyptian President Mohamed Morsi during the 2013 Egyptian coup d'état.
