= Ahmed Mohammed Ali =

Egyptian Army spokesperson

Media Adviser to the Egyptian President
- Incumbent
- Assumed office 1 July 2014
- President: Abdel Fattah el-Sisi
- Prime Minister: Ibrahim Mahlab
- Preceded by: Ahmed el-Moslmani

1st Spokesperson for the Egyptian Armed Forces
- In office 8 September 2012 – 1 July 2014
- President: Muhammed Morsi Adly Mansour Abdel Fattah el-Sisi
- Prime Minister: Hesham Qandil Hazem Al Beblawi Ibrahim Mahlab
- Preceded by: Position inaugurated
- Succeeded by: Mohamed Samir

Personal details
- Born: 19 November 1972 (age 53) Cairo, Egypt

Military service
- Allegiance: Egypt
- Branch/service: Egyptian Army
- Years of service: 1 July 1991 – July 2014
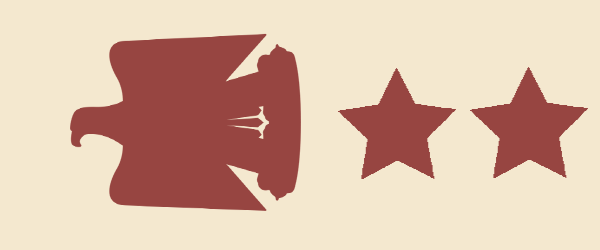
- Rank: Colonel
- Unit: Infantry
- Battles/wars: Sinai insurgency

Colonel Ahmed Mohammed Ali (Arabic: أحمد محمد علي; also known as Ahmed Ali; born 19 November 1972) is the media adviser to the Egyptian president Abdel Fattah el-Sisi and the ex spokesperson of the Egyptian Army. He was appointed first Army Sopkesman on the backdrop of the deposition of president Mohamed Morsi, and his official Army Spokesman Facebook page exceeded 2,000,000 followers at the time, and the Egyptian media kept a close and attentive watch of the statuses published by the army, often resulting in army related articles and reports.

Ali finished his studies at Egypt's military college in 1991. Afterwards he served in the Egyptian army's infantry corps, where he held various positions, including regiment commander. He then assumed a position with the military college's teaching facility, as well as that of the army's general command and officer's school.

== Qualifications ==
- Bachelor of Military Sciences from the military College
- Bachelor of Military Sciences from Royal Military Academy Sandhurst
- The inevitable Educational brigades of infantry Unit
- US Army Command & General Staff College, Fort Leavenworth, Kansas 's Course
- M.A. of Military Sciences from Commanders and General Staff College
- School of Advanced Military Studies, Fort Leavenworth, Kansas 's Course
- M.A. of Military Sciences from School of Advanced Military Studies
- NATO Defense College, Rome, IT 's Senior leaders' Course
- Defense Language Institute, Lackland Air force Base, Texas 's Diploma in English.

== Orders, decorations and medals ==
- Military Duty Decoration, Second Third.
- Military Duty Decoration, Second Class.
- Military Duty Decoration, First Class.
- Longevity & Exemplary Medal.
- Silver Jubilee of October War Medal.
- Golden Jubilee of the 23rd of July Revolution.
- Silver Jubilee of The Liberation Of Sinai Medal.
- Brunei Medal from Royal Military Academy Sandhurst
- 25 January Revolution Medal.
