= Sami Hafez Anan =

Former chief of staff of the Egyptian Armed Forces

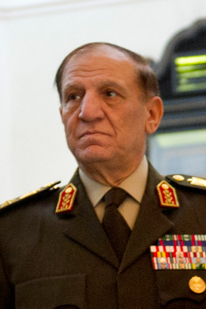
- Anan in 2012

Deputy Chairman of the Supreme Council of the Armed Forces of Egypt
- In office 11 February 2011 – 30 June 2012
- Chairman: Mohamed Hussein Tantawi
- Preceded by: Omar Suleiman (Vice President)
- Succeeded by: Sedki Sobhi

Chief of Staff of the Armed Forces
- In office 2005 – 12 August 2012
- President: Hosni Mubarak; Mohamed Hussein Tantawi (Acting); Mohamed Morsi
- Commander: Mohamed Hussein Tantawi
- Preceded by: Hamdi Weheiba
- Succeeded by: Sedki Sobhi

Commander of the Egyptian Air Defense Command
- In office 19 July 2001 – 30 October 2005
- President: Hosni Mubarak
- Preceded by: Mohammed Elshahat
- Succeeded by: Abd El Aziz Seif-Eldeen

Personal details
- Born: 27 February 1948 (age 78) Salamoun El Qamash, Dakahlia Governorate, Kingdom of Egypt
- Party: Arabism Egypt Party
- Awards: Merit Of Distinguished Service; Medal of Long Service and Good Example

Military service
- Allegiance: Egypt
- Branch/service: Egyptian Air Defense Forces
- Years of service: 1968–2012
- Rank: Lieutenant General
- Commands: SA-6 Missile Battery Commander (1973–76); Battalion Commander (1981–1985) (SAM (SA-3) and (SA-6)); Brigade Commander (1985–90); Defense Attaché in Morocco (1990–93); Brigade Commander (1993–96); Air Defense Forces Division Commander (1996–98); Chief of Air Defense Forces operation department (1998–2001); Air Defense Forces Commander-in-Chief (2001–05); Chief of Staff of Egyptian Armed Forces (2005–12)
- Battles/wars: War of Attrition; Yom Kippur War; Sinai insurgency

Lieutenant General Sami Hafez Anan (Arabic: سامى حافظ عنان, IPA: [ˈsæːmi ˈħɑːfezˤ ʕæˈnæːn, -ʕeˈnæːn]; born 27 February 1948) is a retired Egyptian military officer. He was the Chief of the General Staff of the Armed Forces from 2005 until August 2012 when his retirement was announced by President Mohamed Morsi. In January 2018, he announced himself as a candidate in the 2018 Egyptian presidential election, though he was arrested and later released.

== Early career ==
He commanded a brigade from 1992. From 1990 to 1993 he was the Egyptian Defence Attaché to Morocco. From 1996 to 1998 he reportedly commanded the 5th Air Defence Division. More recently he served as the Commander of the Egyptian Air Defence Forces from 2001 to 2005. He served as Deputy Chairman of the Supreme Council of the Armed Forces.

== 2011 events ==
When the 2011 Egyptian Revolution began in January 2011, Anan was in Washington, D.C. "for a week of meetings with senior American officers". Cutting his visit short, he returned to Egypt on 28 January. As the commander of an army of 468,000 troops, he was considered likely to play a crucial role in the political uncertainty surrounding the protests. On 1 February 2011, the UK's Channel 4 News reported that the United States was pressing for Anan to play a role in coordinating interim arrangements for government in Egypt after Hosni Mubarak.

As the protests built momentum into their second week, there was considerable speculation whether Enan, on one hand, was "'too close to Mubarak to stay,' [per ...] Gawdat Bahgat, a professor at National Defense University in Washington who has worked extensively with Egyptian officers attending the school," or, on the other, "a trusted partner. Retired Army Lt. Gen. R. Steven Whitcomb, who oversaw joint exercises with the Egyptian military while stationed in the Middle East, invited Enan and his wife to his home at Fort McPherson in Atlanta for a private dinner in 2007. According to Whitcomb, Enan complained about the effect that budget cuts were having on the military as the Mubarak administration dealt with political and economic problems."

The Supreme Council of the Armed Forces is the body of 18 senior military men, including Anan, to which the power to govern was handed by departing President Mubarak on 11 February 2011. Only Hussein Tantawi ranked ahead of Anan on the armed forces website and in the Council at that time, according to Al Jazeera.

Assessing U.S. views of Anan thereafter, particularly by way of the United States diplomatic cables leak, The Guardian newspaper saw Anan "as more amenable to personal ties" than the older, change-resistant and standoffish Tantawi. Also, the story said, the Muslim Brotherhood "has described [Anan] as incorruptible and as one of its cleric[s] put it: 'He can be the future man of Egypt … I think he will be acceptable.'" As the newspaper saw it, this gave the "Soviet-trained" general an unusual span of support in the post-Mubarak government". On 12 August 2012, President Mohamed Morsi announced Anan's retirement, and his replacement by Abdel Fattah el-Sisi. On 2 October 2012, the Egyptian public prosecutor announced that Anan would be investigated for corruption, the first such investigation against a military figure.

== Elections ==
Anan formed the Arabism Egypt Party in 2014, which ran in the Egyptian 2015 parliamentary election.

Anan accepted his nomination by the Arabism Egypt Party to run for the March 2018 Egyptian presidential election.

Anan was arrested for violating the military rules for announcing his candidacy without seeking the Supreme Council of the Armed Forces approval, which "constituted clear incitement against the armed forces with the intention of driving a wedge between it and the great Egyptian people." He was also accused of forging documents to falsely indicate his military service was terminated. He was released on 22 December 2019.

Military offices
Preceded by Mohammed Elshahat	Commander of the Egyptian Air Defence Forces; 19 July 2001 – 30 October 2005	Succeeded by Abd El Aziz Seif-Eldeen
