= Military ranks of the Kingdom of Egypt =

The Turco-Egyptian ranks were the military ranks used by the Kingdom of Egypt from 1922 until they were changed in 1958 after the Egyptian Revolution of 1952 and the abolition of the monarchy. The names are Turco-Egyptian (i.e. derived from Ottoman Turkish and Arabic), and are derived at least in part from the pre-existing military structure developed out of the reforms of Muhammad Ali Pasha. The design of the rank insignia was completely British with high ranks given only to British officers during Britain's occupation of Egypt. The rank of Sirdar was given to the British Commander-in-Chief of the Egyptian Army.

== Ranks ==
=== Officers ===
The rank insignia for commissioned officers.

Rank group	General / flag officers					Senior officers			Junior officers
Royal Egyptian Army
Royal Egyptian Army	مشير; Mushir	سردار; Sirdar	فريق; Ferik	لواء; Liwa'	أميرألاى; Amiralay	قائم مقام; Kaymakam	بكباشى; Bikbashi	صاغ; Sagh Kol Aghassi	يوزباشى; Yuzbashi	ملازم أول; Mulazim Awwal	ملازم ثانى; Mulazim Tani
Royal Egyptian Air Force
Royal Egyptian Air Force		Air chief marshal	Air marshal	Air vice marshal	Air commodore	Group captain	Wing commander	Squadron leader	Flight lieutenant	Flying officer	Pilot officer
Rank group	General / flag officers					Senior officers			Junior officers

=== Enlisted ===
Rank group	Senior NCOs			Junior NCOs	Enlisted
Royal Egyptian Army
Royal Egyptian Army	صول; Mosa'id	باش شاويش; Raqib awwal	شاويش; Raqib	أومباشي 'arif	عسكري; Jondi awwal
Royal Egyptian Air Force
Royal Egyptian Air Force	صول; Mosa'id	باش شاويش; Raqib awwal	شاويش; Raqib	أومباشي 'arif	عسكري; Jondi awwal

== See also ==
- Military ranks of Egypt
