= Arabism Egypt Party =

Political party in Egypt founded by Sami Anan

Arabism Egypt Party حزب مصر العروبة الديمقراطي
- Leader: Samir Sami Anan
- Founded: 2014
- Ideology: Reformism
- House of Representatives: 0 / 568

The Arabism Egypt Party is a political party in Egypt founded by Sami Anan. The party planned to run in the 2015 Egyptian parliamentary election, possibly as part of an electoral alliance. The Supreme Electoral Commission announced on 3 December 2014 that it had declined the establishment of the party and referred the case to the Supreme Administrative Court to determine its status. The Supreme Administrative Court accepted the party's appeal on 28 January 2015 allowing the party to be formed. It didn't win any seats in the House of Representatives in the election.
