= Helmy Afify Abd El-Bar =

Egyptian military commander

Commander of the Egyptian Air Defense Command
- In office January 1975 – December 1979
- President: Anwar Sadat
- Preceded by: Mohammed Aly Fahmy
- Succeeded by: El-Said Hamdy

Personal details
- Born: 13 July 1922
- Died: 24 March 2011 (aged 88)

Military service
- Allegiance: Egypt
- Branch/service: Air Defense Forces
- Years of service: 1942–1979
- Rank: Colonel General
- Unit: 22nd King's Own Artillery Regiment
- Commands: 2nd Air Defense Division; 1st AD Brigade, 1960-64.
- Battles/wars: World War II; Palestine War; Tripartite Aggression; Six-Day War; Yom Kippur War

General Dr. Helmy Afify Abd El-Bar (13 July 1922 – 24 March 2011) was a highly decorated Egyptian military commander.

He was commissioned from the Military College in June 1942 in an Artillery regiment of the Egyptian Army. He was aide de camp to General Anwar Sadat between 1954 and 1956. He was chief staff officer and chief of operations in an Artillery Brigade in the 1956 War. He commanded an Air Defense Division from 1965 till 1969, and was the Chief of Operations and Staff of the Air Defense Forces from 1969 till 1975. He was commander-in-chief of the Air Defence Forces from Jan.1975 to Dec.1979. He was Deputy Chairman of the Arab Organization for Industrialization between 1979 and 1984, and retired from public life after that.

He completed the basic officer's course in Air Defense from the Soviet Union in 1958–59 and completed his PhD from the Govorov Air Defense College in 1970. His thesis was on providing Air Defense cover and protection to heavy Field Artillery units in open desert terrain, and combined operations between the two branches. He died on 24 March 2011.

Military offices
Preceded by Mohammed Aly Fahmy	Commander of the Egyptian Air Defence Forces; January 1975 - December 1979	Succeeded by El-Said Hamdy
