= Zaher Abd El-Rahman =

Egyptian general

- زاهر عبد الرحمن
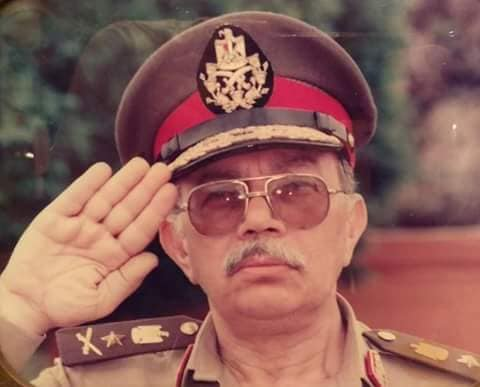
- Zaher Abd El-Rahman

Commander of the Egyptian Air Defense Command
- In office December 1990 – April 1993
- President: Hosni Mubarak
- Preceded by: Mostafa El-Shazly
- Succeeded by: Ahmed Abou Talib

Personal details
- Born: 12 September 1935 (age 90) Cairo
- Died: 2022

Military service
- Allegiance: Egypt
- Branch/service: Air Defense Forces
- Years of service: 1955–1993
- Rank: Lieutenant General
- Unit: 6th Combat Engineering Regiment
- Commands: 17th Air Defense Battalion (1973–1976)
- Battles/wars: 6th of October حرب أكتوبر

Zaher Abd El-Rahman or Lieutenant general Mohamed Zaher Abdelrahman (arabic: زاهر عبدالرحمن) born on September 12, 1935, was an Egyptian military officer who held many military and government positions.

== Career ==
Abd El-Rahman was Commander of the Egyptian Air Defence Forces from 1990 until 1993. He graduated from the Military College in October 1955 and was commissioned into an Engineering regiment. He served as a combat engineer officer in an engineering battalions in Yemen. He was inducted into the Air Defense Forces in 1968 and completed the Air Defense officer's basic course in 1969 and Higher Command course in 1971. He was commander of the Air Defence Forces from Dec. 1990 to April 1993.

He served as the Governor of Matrouh Governorate from 1993 to 1995 and the governor of the Red Sea Governorate from 1996 to 1997.

He also served as the Chairman of Al-Zohour Sporting club where he oversaw the construction of the New Cairo branch.

Zaher Abd El-Rahman was chief of a SAM Battalion during the war of 1973. Augmenting JY-9A and TPS 59/34 radar systems to the Air defence forces. Starting the operation of Eastern sector of command, control and communication system of the Air defence forces. He participated in the Six-Day War of 1967 and the Yom Kippur War of 1973.

Military offices
Preceded by Mostafa El-Shazly	Commander of the Egyptian Air Defence Forces; December 1990 – April 1993	Succeeded by Ahmed Abou Talib
