= Adel Khalil =

Egyptian Air Defense Forces Commander

Commander of the Egyptian Air Defense Command
- In office January 1986 – December 1987
- President: Hosni Mubarak
- Preceded by: El-Said Hamdy
- Succeeded by: Mostafa El-Shazly

Military service
- Allegiance: Egypt
- Branch/service: Air Defense Forces
- Years of service: 1951–1987
- Rank: Lieutenant General
- Unit: 2nd Signal Regiment (Signal Corps)

Adel Khalil (Arabic: عادل خليل) is a former Commander of the Egyptian Air Defense Forces.

He graduated from the Military College in July 1951, and was commissioned in a Signals unit. Khalil commanded a Signals Company in the Suez War. He was inducted into the Air Defence Forces in 1968 as a colonel, and was commander of the Air Defence Forces from January 1986 to December 1987.

== Major activities ==
Second in command of a Brigade of Air Defence units during 6 October war. Continuing the studies of applying the automation system to Air Defence forces.

He participated in the following wars:

- Tripartite Aggression
- The Six-Day War
- The Yom Kippur War

Military offices
Preceded by El-Said Hamdy	Commander of the Egyptian Air Defence Forces; January 1986 - December 1987	Succeeded by Mostafa El-Shazly
