= Armed Forces Management and Administration (Egypt) =

The Armed Forces Management and Administration Agency is part of the Egyptian Ministry of Defense.

The agency is tasked with selecting volunteers based on medical, physical, cultural, professional, and psychological tests. It also sets standards for optimal utilization of manpower commensurate with the capabilities and potential of its troops.
