= Ministry of Defense (Egypt) =

Government ministry of Egypt

- وزارة الدفاع
- Seal of the Egyptian Armed Forces

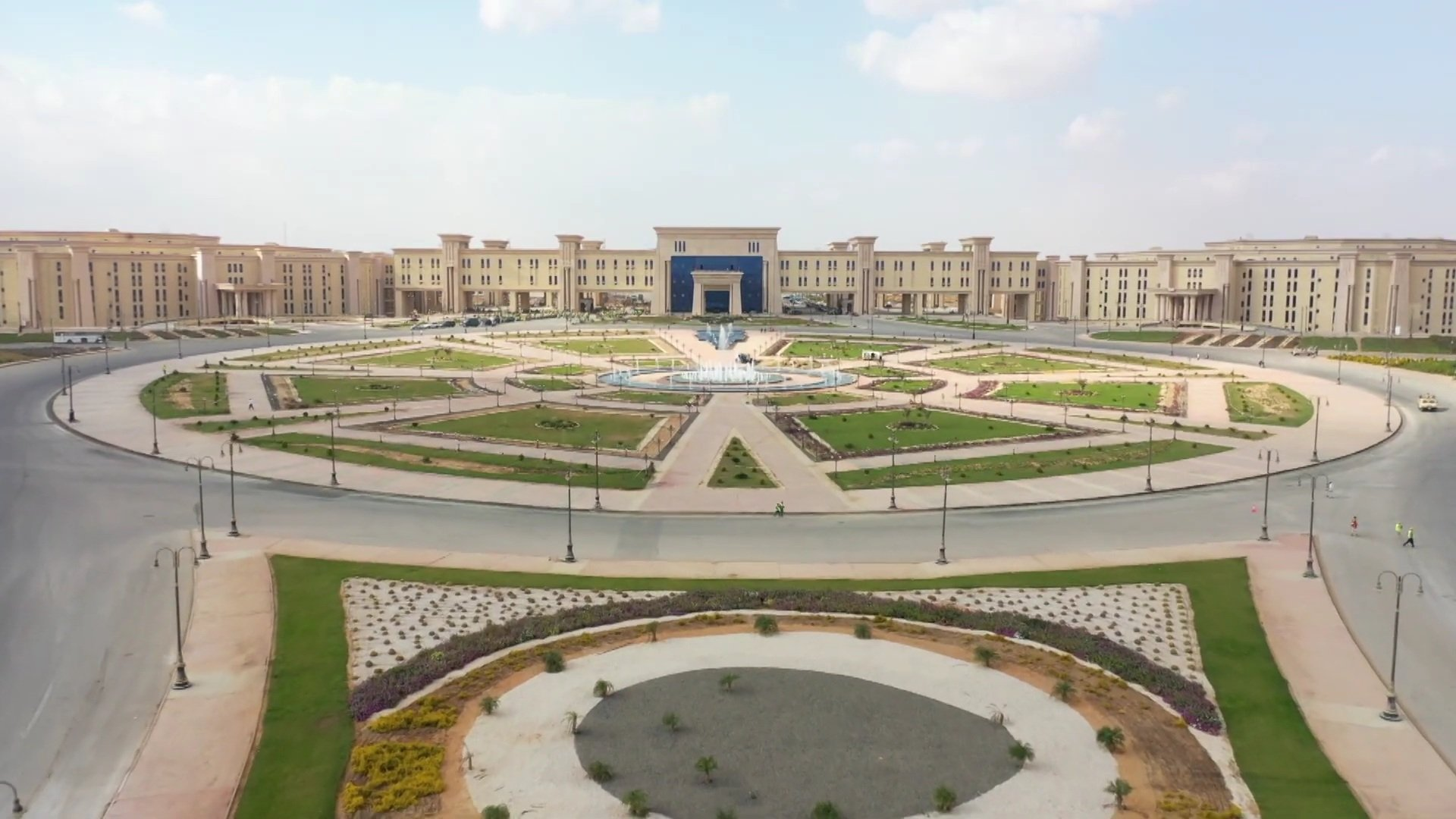
- The Octagon

Agency overview
- Formed: 1878; 148 years ago
- Jurisdiction: Government of Egypt
- Headquarters: The Octagon, New Capital, Egypt; 29°56′16.5″N 31°39′14.1″E
- Minister responsible: Lieutenant general Ashraf Salem Zaher
- Website: www.mod.gov.eg

The Egyptian Ministry of Defense is the ministry responsible for the Egyptian Armed Forces organization and manages its affairs and maintains its facilities. It also handles the affairs of colleges and military recruitment, mobilization and management of veterans and military factories in Egypt through the Armed Forces Management and Administration Agency.

The ministry was established in 1878 during the reign of Khedive Isma'il, and was later named the Ministry of War, until it was renamed to the Ministry of Defense on 4 October 1978. The Egyptian Ministry of Defense is headquartered in the State Strategic Command Center, commonly referred to as The Octagon, in The New Capital.

== List of ministers ==
The following is a list of ministers of Defense of Egypt since the Egyptian revolution of 1952. The position was known until 14 May 1971 as the Minister of War. The Minister direct the Egyptian Armed Forces. Article 201 of the Constitution of Egypt states that the Minister is the Commander-in-Chief of the Armed Forces, and shall be appointed from among its officers.

No.	Portrait	Minister	Title	Took office	Left office	Time in office	Defence branch	Ref.
1	Mohamed Naguib	Major General; Mohamed Naguib (1901–1984)	Armed Forces Commander-in-Chief (1952) Minister of War and the Navy, Armed Forces Commander-in-Chief (1952–1953)	24 July 1952	18 July 1953	359 days	Egyptian Army	
2	Abdel Latif Boghdadi	Wing Commander; Abdel Latif Boghdadi (1917–1999)	Minister of War	8 July 1953	7 April 1954	273 days	Egyptian Air Force	
3	Abdel Hakim Amer	Major General; Abdel Hakim Amer (1919–1967)	Armed Forces Commander-in-Chief	7 April 1954	31 August 1954	146 days	Egyptian Army	
4	Hussein el-Shafei	Lieutenant Colonel; Hussein el-Shafei (1918–2005)	Minister of War	17 April 1954	31 August 1954	45 days	Egyptian Army	
(3)	Abdel Hakim Amer	Field Marshal; Abdel Hakim Amer (1919–1967)	Armed Forces Commander-in-Chief (1954–1956) Vice President of the Republic, Minister of War, Armed Forces Commander-in-Chief (1956–1962)	31 August 1954	29 September 1962	8 years, 29 days	Egyptian Army	
5	Abdel Wahab el-Beshry	Abdel Wahab el-Beshry	Minister of War	29 September 1962	10 September 1966	3 years, 346 days	Egyptian Army	
6	Shams Badran	Shams Badran (1929–2020)	Minister of War	10 September 1966	10 June 1967	273 days	Egyptian Army	
–	Abdel Wahab el-Beshry	Abdel Wahab el-Beshry; Acting	Minister of War	19 June 1967	22 July 1967	33 days	Egyptian Army	
7	Amin Howeidi	Amin Howeidi (1921–2009)	Minister of War	22 July 1967	24 February 1968	217 days	Egyptian Army	
8	Mohamed Fawzi	General; Mohamed Fawzi (1915–2000)	Minister of War, Armed Forces Commander-in-Chief	24 February 1968	14 May 1971	3 years, 79 days	Egyptian Army	
9	Mohammed Ahmed Sadek	General; Mohammed Ahmed Sadek (1917–1991)	Minister of War, Armed Forces Commander-in-Chief	14 May 1971	26 October 1972	1 year, 165 days	Egyptian Army	
10	Ahmad Ismail Ali	General; Ahmad Ismail Ali (1917–1974)	Minister of War	26 October 1972	28 December 1974 †	2 years, 63 days	Egyptian Army	
11	Mohamed Abdel Ghani el-Gamasy	General; Mohamed Abdel Ghani el-Gamasy (1921–2003)	Minister of War, Armed Forces Commander-in-Chief	28 December 1974	4 October 1978	3 years, 280 days	Egyptian Army	
12	Kamal Hassan Ali	General; Kamal Hassan Ali (1921–1993)	Minister of Defense and Military Production, Armed Forces Commander-in-Chief	4 October 1978	13 May 1980	1 year, 222 days	Egyptian Army	
13	Ahmed Badawi	Lieutenant General; Ahmed Badawi (1927–1981)	Minister of Defense and Military Production, Armed Forces Commander-in-Chief	14 May 1980	3 March 1981 †	293 days	Egyptian Army	
14	Abd Al-Halim Abu-Ghazala	Field Marshal; Abd Al-Halim Abu-Ghazala (1930–2008)	Minister of Defense and Military Production, Armed Forces Commander-in-Chief	4 March 1981	15 April 1989	8 years, 42 days	Egyptian Army	
15	Youssef Sabri Abu Taleb	Lieutenant General; Youssef Sabri Abu Taleb (1929–2008)	Minister of Defense and Military Production, Armed Forces Commander-in-Chief	15 April 1989	20 May 1991	2 years, 35 days	Egyptian Army	
16	Muhammad Hussein Tantawy	Field Marshal; Muhammad Hussein Tantawy (1935–2021)	Armed Forces Commander-in-Chief, Minister of Defense and Military Production	20 May 1991	12 August 2012	21 years, 84 days	Egyptian Army	
17	Abdel Fattah el-Sisi	Field Marshal; Abdel Fattah el-Sisi (born 1954)	Armed Forces Commander-in-Chief, Minister of Defense and Military Production	12 August 2012	26 March 2014	1 year, 226 days	Egyptian Army	
18	Sedki Sobhy	General; Sedki Sobhy (born 1955)	Armed Forces Commander-in-Chief, Minister of Defense and Military Production	27 March 2014	14 June 2018	4 years, 79 days	Egyptian Army	
19	Mohamed Ahmed Zaki	General; Mohamed Ahmed Zaki (born 1956)	Armed Forces Commander-in-Chief, Minister of Defense and Military Production	14 June 2018	2 July 2024	6 years, 18 days	Egyptian Army	
20	Abdel Mageed Saqr	General; Abdel Mageed Saqr (born 1955)	Armed Forces Commander-in-Chief, Minister of Defense and Military Production	3 July 2024	10 February 2026	1 year, 222 days	Egyptian Army	
21	Ashraf Salem Zaher	Lieutenant General; Ashraf Salem Zaher (born 1974)	Armed Forces Commander-in-Chief, Minister of Defense and Military Production	11 February 2026	Incumbent	252 days*	Egyptian Army	

* Incumbent's time in office last updated: 21 October 2026.

== Agencies and departments ==
- Armed Forces Armaments Authority
- Armed Forces Engineering Authority
- Armed Forces Finance Authority
- Armed Forces Logistics Authority
- Armed Forces Management and Administration
- Armed Forces Training Authority
- Military Operations Authority
- Military justice
- Morale Affairs

== See also ==
- Cabinet of Egypt
- Egyptian Armed Forces
- Chief of Staff of the Armed Forces (Egypt)
