= Mohammed Aly Fahmy =

Egyptian military officer (1920–1999)

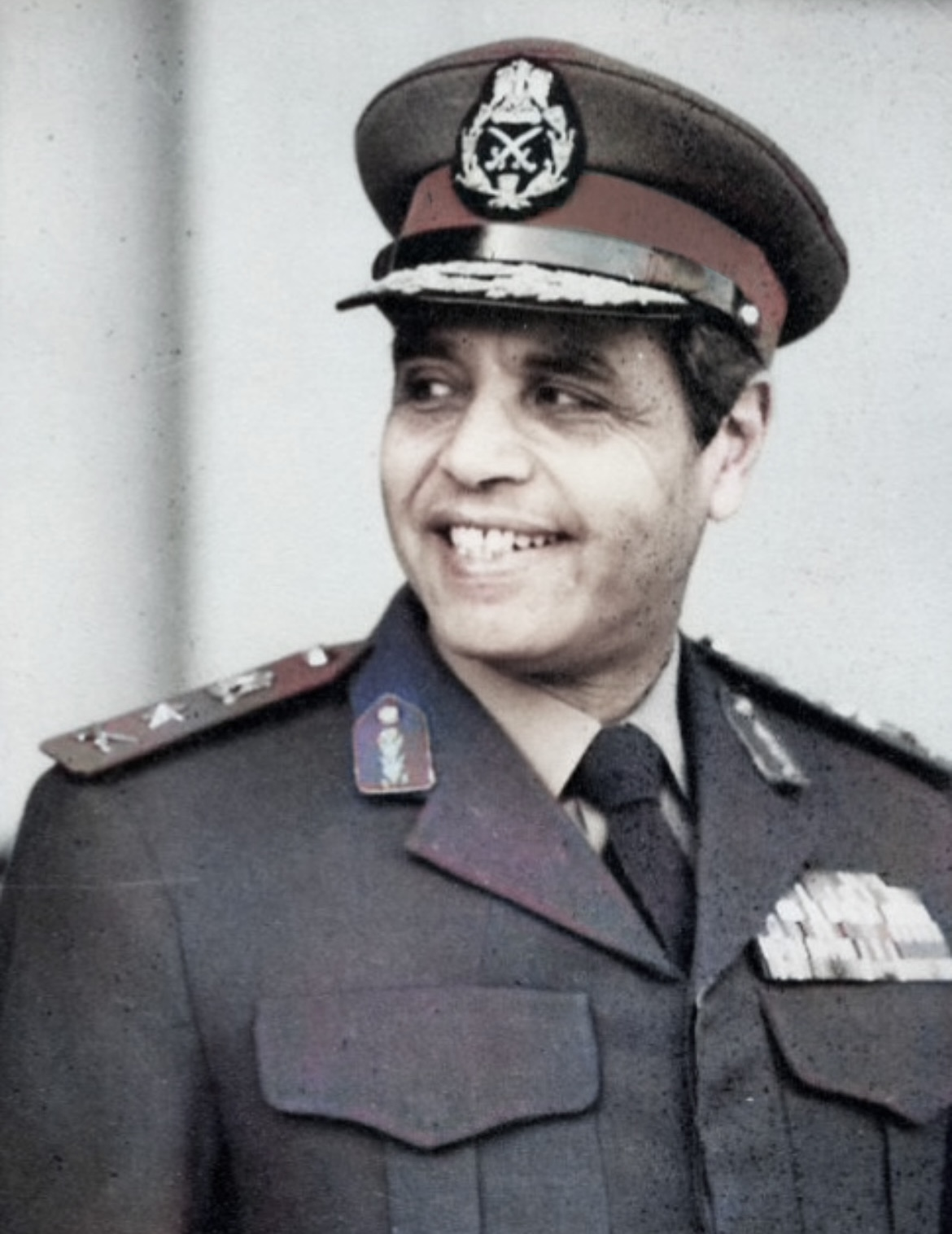

Chief of Staff of the Egyptian Armed Forces
- In office 3 January 1975 – 4 October 1978
- President: Anwar Sadat
- Preceded by: Mohamed Abdel Ghani el-Gamasy
- Succeeded by: Ahmed Badawi

Commander of the Egyptian Air Defense Command
- In office September 1968 – January 1975
- President: Gamal Abdel Nasser; Anwar Sadat
- Preceded by: Title created
- Succeeded by: Helmy Afify Abd El-Bar

Personal details
- Born: 11 October 1920 Cairo
- Died: 11 September 1999 (aged 78)
- Awards: Medal of Military Duty

Military service
- Allegiance: Egypt
- Branch/service: Air Defense Forces
- Years of service: 1940–1978
- Rank: Field Marshal
- Unit: 12th Cavalry

Mohammed Aly Fahmy (11 October 1920 – 11 September 1999) was an Egyptian field marshal, known as the "Father of the Egyptian Air Defense".

== Early life, education and early career ==
Fahmy was born in Cairo in 1920. He received a degree in engineering from the Cairo University. Then he graduated from the Egyptian Military Academy in 1940 and from the Air Defense Academy in Kalinin, Soviet Union.

Following his qraduation Fahmy was commissioned in a cavalry unit and initially commanded armored platoons and squadrons equipped with Cruiser Mk I, Mk II, Crusader and Sherman tanks. In 1952 he was in command of an armored battalion at Alexandria and was crucial during the July coup.

== Military years ==
In 1953, he was made an executive staff officer in the Defense Ministry. In 1954 he was promoted to the rank of colonel. From 1955 onwards he became interested in the concept of Air Defense and proposed to President Nasser to further extend the existing Air Defense units in the Army which until then was only based on British 20mm Flak guns. Between 1957 and 1961, six Air Defense battalions, grouped under 2 Brigades were raised from scratch under his supervision as General Staff Officer-II in charge of Operations in the Army HQ. From 1957–59 he studied in the Soviet Union the concepts and practicals of Air Defense, and came back to command an Air Defense Brigade. Since the 1930s, Air Defense was considered to be a "combat support" arm of the regular Army and was considered less prestigious than the 'combat arms' of Infantry, Cavalry and Field Artillery. He was made a Major General in 1963. In 1964, he completed a PhD in the Soviet Union on Air Defense strategy and became the commander of one of the only two Air Defense Divisions in the Army. He participated in World War II, the 1948 Arab–Israeli War, the Suez Crisis, the Six-Day War, the War of Attrition and the Yom Kippur War.

== Military influence ==
After the debacle of 1967, he prevailed upon Nasser to make the Air Defense a separate branch of the Armed Forces, based on the Soviet model. Between 1968 and 1971 he raised five new Air Defense Brigades and two new Air Defense Divisions, plus established an Air Defense Academy in 1970 for the training of young officers and conscripts. He was the first commander of the Egyptian Air Defense Command from September 1968 to January 1975 and Chief of Staff of the Egyptian Armed Forces from January 1975 to October 1978. In this capacity he was also the Deputy Chairman of the Supreme Council of the Armed Forces and a close aide to President Sadat.

== Personal life ==
Fahmy married Nadia Abaza in 1959. They had three children.

== Later years ==
He is mostly known for his planning and management of the Egyptian Air Defense Command during the Attrition War and 6 October war and for building "the Egyptian Missile Wall". He resigned as Chief-of-Staff of the Armed Forces owing to opposition with Egypt's rapprochement with Israel and due to his conflict and rivalry with Hosni Mubarak, a man several years his junior but becoming more important than him in the corridors of power during the Sadat era. He retired to live in Iraq from 1980 onwards.

=== Awards ===
Fahmy was the recipient of the Order of Liberation, Memorial Order of Founding of the United Arab Republic, Military Star; Star of Honour (Palestine Liberation Organization); Yugoslav Star with Gold Belt (First Class) and Order of King Abdulaziz (First Class).

Military offices
Preceded by Mohamed Abdel Ghani el-Gamasy	Chief of Staff of the Egyptian Armed Forces; 3 January 1975 – 4 October 1978	Succeeded by Ahmed Badawi

Military offices
Preceded by Title created	Commander of the Egyptian Air Defence Forces; September 1968 – January 1975	Succeeded by Helmy Afify Abd El-Bar
