= El-Said Hamdy =

Egyptian Air Defense commander (born 1928)

Commander of the Egyptian Air Defense Command
- In office December 1979 – January 1986
- President: Anwar Sadat
- Preceded by: Helmy Afify Abd El-Bar
- Succeeded by: Adel Khalil

Personal details
- Born: 24 February 1928

Military service
- Allegiance: Egypt
- Branch/service: Air Defense Forces
- Years of service: 1948–1986
- Rank: Lieutenant General
- Unit: 17th Horse Artillery
- Commands: Air Defense College (1969–1972); 2nd Air Defense Brigade (1972–1975); 3rd Air Defense Division (1975–1978); Director of Air Defense Operations and Staff (1978–1979); Egyptian Air Defense Forces (1979–1986)

El-Said Hamdy (born 24 February 1928) graduated from the Military College on Feb. 1948. Served in an Artillery regiment in the 1948 War. Commanded a Self-Propelled Artillery battery in the Suez War. Commander of the Air Defence Forces from Dec.1979 to Jan.1986.

Major Activities:

Diversification of sources of Air Defence weapons and augmenting the following stern missiles and Radar equipment: Hawk, Amoun missiles systems, TPS 59, TPS 63 radar systems to the Air Defence forces. Starting the studies of applying command control and communication system to the Air defence forces. Participated in the following wars:

- Tripartite Aggression
- Six Day War
- Yom Kippur War

Military offices
| Preceded by Helmy Afify Abd El-Bar | Commander of the Egyptian Air Defence Forces; December 1979 – January 1986 | Succeeded by Adel Khalil |
