= Abd El Aziz Seif-Eldeen =

Lieutenant General of Egyptian army force

Chairman of the Arab Organization for Industrialization
- Incumbent
- Assumed office 12 August 2012

Commander of the Egyptian Air Defense Forces
- In office 30 October 2005 – 12 August 2012
- Preceded by: Sami Anan
- Succeeded by: Abdul Meniem Al-Toras

Personal details
- Born: June 3, 1949 (age 76)

Military service
- Allegiance: Egypt
- Branch/service: Egyptian Air Defense Forces
- Years of service: 1970–2012
- Rank: Lieutenant General
- Commands: Commander of SA-6 Missile Battalion (1988–1995); Commander of AD Missile Brigade (1995–2000); Commander of AD Division (2000–2001); Chief of AD OPERATION Department (2001–2005); Commander of The Egyptian Air Defense Forces (2005–present)
- Battles/wars: War of Attrition; Yom Kippur War
- Awards: Sinai liberation merit Military duty Merit Training merit Excellent Service merit Medal of long Service and Good Example; The Six of October 1973 medal Patriots of October 1973 medal The Twentieth anniversary of revolution medal The Air defense day medal The silver anniversary of October War victory medal The fiftieth anniversary of revolution medal

Abd El Aziz Seif-Eldeen (Arabic: عبد العزيز سيف الدين; born June 3, 1949) is a Lieutenant General of the Egyptian Armed Forces.

== Biography ==
He joined military college in 1968, and graduated two years later. Seif-Eldeen advanced to the position of commander of the Egyptian Air Defence Forces in 2005. He is a member of the Supreme Council of the Armed Forces that became the ruling body of Egypt when Mubarak resigned on February 11, 2011.

Military offices
Preceded by Sami Hafez Anan	Commander of the Egyptian Air Defence Forces; 30 October 2005–12 August 2012	Succeeded by Abdul Meniem Al-Toras
