= Ahmed Abou Talib =

Commander of the Egyptian Air Defense Command
- In office April 1993 – April 1996
- President: Hosni Mubarak
- Preceded by: Zaher Abd El-Rahman
- Succeeded by: Mohammed Elshahat

Personal details
- Born: 4 August 1938 (age 87)

Military service
- Allegiance: Egypt
- Branch/service: Air Defense Forces
- Years of service: 1959–1996
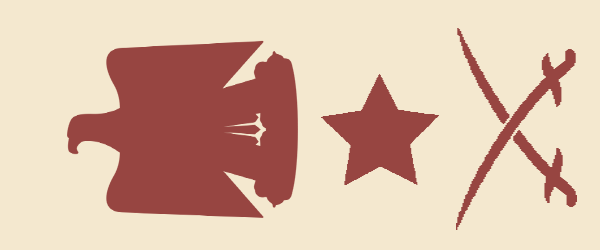
- Rank: Lieutenant General
- Unit: 6th SPAAG Regiment
- Battles/wars: Six Day War; War of Attrition; Yom Kippur War

Ahmed Abou Talib is a former commander of the Egyptian Air Defence Forces. He graduated from the Military College in April 1959 and was commissioned in a SPAAG regiment. He was Commander-in-Chief of the Air Defence Forces from April 1993 to April 1996.

Major Activities:

Commanding a Battalion of SA-3 and ZSU-23-4 during the War of Attrition between 1970 and 1973. Chief of Operations in 2nd SAM Brigade from 1973 until 1977. Commander of 1st SAM Brigade between 1979 and 1982. Starting the operation of central sector of command, control and communication system of the Air defence forces. Participated in the following wars:

- 1967 war
- 1973 war

Military offices
Preceded by Zaher Abd El-Rahman	Commander of the Egyptian Air Defence Forces; April 1993 – April 1996	Succeeded by Mohammed Elshahat
