= Mohamed Abdel Hamid El-Shahat =

Egyptian retired military officer (born 1941)

Mohammed Elshahat
- Born: 1 February 1941
- Allegiance: Egypt
- Branch: Egyptian Air Defense Forces
- Service years: 1962–2001
- Rank: Lieutenant General
- Commands: Egyptian Air Defense Forces
- Conflicts: Six-Day War; Yom Kippur War
- Awards: Medal of Excellent Service; Merit of Long Service and Good Example; Merit of Training; Merit of Military Duty

Lieutenant General Mohammed Elshahat (born 1 February 1941) is an Egyptian retired military officer who served as the commander of the Egyptian Air Defense Forces from April 1996 until 19 July 2001. He succeeded Ahmed Abou Talib in this role and was followed by Sami Hafez Anan.

== Early life and education ==
Elshahat was born on 1 February 1941. He pursued military education, undertaking several advanced air defense courses. Between 1969 and 1971, he attended the Govorov Air Defense Academy in the Soviet Union, completing the Air Defense Battalion Commander course. He later completed the Air Defense Brigade Commander course, a staff course at the Command and Staff College, and obtained a fellowship degree from Nasser Academy's War College. Additionally, he completed the High Commander course at Nasser Academy.

== Military career ==
Elshahat's military service began in 1962, spanning nearly four decades until his retirement in 2001. His early roles included commanding ZSU-23-2 and ZSU-23-4 platoons from 1962 to 1966. He then served as an SA-2 battery commander between 1966 and 1969 and as second-in-command for SA-2 and SA-3 battalions from 1969 to 1973.

Following these positions, Elshahat was appointed chief of operations and planning for the 4th Air Defense Missile Brigade (1973–1975), commander of an SA-6 battalion (1975–1976), and deputy director of the Air Defense Training School (1976–1980). He later commanded the 3rd Surface-to-Air Missile Brigade (1980–1984) and served as the military attaché to Iraq (1984–1987). His subsequent roles included commander of the 1st Surface-to-Air Missile Division (1987–1993) and director of air defense operations (1993–1996).

In April 1996, Elshahat was appointed commander of the Egyptian Air Defense Forces, a position he held until 19 July 2001. During his tenure, he oversaw Egypt's air defense strategy and operations.

== Military engagements ==
Throughout his career, Elshahat participated in significant military conflicts, including the Six-Day War (1967) and the Yom Kippur War (1973).

== Awards and decorations ==
Elshahat has received several military honors, including:

- Medal of Excellent Service
- Merit of Long Service and Good Example
- Merit of Training
- Merit of Military Duty

== Personal life ==
Elshahat is married and has four children: two sons and two daughters.

Military offices
Preceded by Ahmed Abou Talib	Commander of the Egyptian Air Defence Forces; April 1996 - 19 July 2001	Succeeded by Sami Hafez Anan
