= Mostafa El-Shazly =

Egyptian general

Commander of the Egyptian Air Defense Command
- In office October 1987 – December 1990
- President: Hosni Mubarak
- Preceded by: Adel Khalil
- Succeeded by: Zaher Abd El-Rahman

Personal details
- Born: 17 September 1934 (age 91)

Military service
- Allegiance: Egypt
- Branch/service: Air Defense Forces
- Years of service: 1955–1990
- Rank: Lieutenant General
- Unit: 8th Armoured Battalion

Mostafa El-Shazly is an Egyptian military leader.

== Career ==
He graduated from the Egyptian Military College in March 1955 and was commissioned in an armoured regiment. He was a principal staff officer (GSO-II) in an armoured brigade in Yemen. He completed Air Defense officer's course in 1969. He commanded an SA-2 and SA-3 Battalion between 1969 and 1973, and a SAM Brigade between 1973 and 1977. He was commander of the Air Defence Forces from Oct.1987 to Dec.1990.

He commanded an Air Defence Brigade unit during the Yom Kippur War. He added the Chaparral missile system to the Air Defence forces. He continued studies of applying automation to Air Defence forces. He participated in the following wars :

- Tripartite Aggression
- North Yemen Civil War
- Six Day War
- Yom Kippur War

Military offices
Preceded by Adel Khalil	Commander of the Egyptian Air Defence Forces; October 1987 - December 1990	Succeeded by Zaher Abd El-Rahman
