= JLP-40 Radar =

The JLP-40 is a tactical air defense radar designed to use with height finding radars such as the JLG-43 Radar. It is similar in design to the Russian "Bar Lock" series radar and may have been derived from it as part of the sale of the SA-2 system from the Former Soviet Union in the early 1960s. It features the same arrangement of the two large scanners attached to front and ear sides of a rotating cabin that houses the transmitter/receivers.

== Operating modes ==
The system operates in D-band, S-band and L-band, each parabolic scanner being illuminated by stacked horn feeds to generate families of multiple beams. There are five S-band transmitter/receivers and these are thought to operate with the lower of the two antennas, while the L-band feeds illuminate the upper scanner array. An IFF interrogator is incorporated in the system. Three PPI displays are available, one azimuth/range display and two to four additional PPI. MTI is provided in the L - band modules.

The whole system is air transportable but requires considerable time and effort to assemble/disassemble. It is being produced by the Chengdu Jin Jiang Electronic System Engineering Company.

== Specifications ==
- D - band
- Range: 270 km
- Height: 20,000 metres
- Azimuth coverage: 360°
- Elevation coverage: 0.5°-30°
- Accuracy: 500 metre (range) +/- 0.5° (bearing)
