= Mohamed Samir =

Egyptian spokesperson

2nd Spokesperson for the Egyptian Armed Forces
- Incumbent
- Assumed office 1 July 2014
- President: Abdel Fattah el-Sisi
- Prime Minister: Ibrahim Mahlab
- Preceded by: Ahmed Mohammed Ali

Military service
- Allegiance: Egypt
- Branch/service: Egyptian Army
- Years of service: 1 July 1988–present
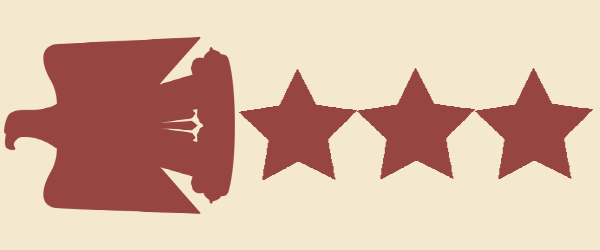
- Rank: Brigadier General
- Unit: Infantry
- Battles/wars: Sinai insurgency

Brigadier General Mohamed Samir Abdel Aziz Ghonim (Arabic: العميد محمد سمير عبد العزيز غنيم; known as Mohamed Samir) is the spokesperson of the Egyptian Armed Forces.

Samir finished his studies at Egypt's military academy in 1988 before he served in the Egyptian army's infantry corps, where he held various positions, including battalion commander. He then assumed a position with the military college's teaching facility, in addition to serving as a military attaché in UAE.

== Qualifications ==
=== Civil ===
- Bachelor of Commerce from Ain Shams University

=== Military ===
- Bachelor of Military Sciences from the military academy.
- The inevitable Educational brigades of infantry Unit.
- Basic Paratrooper Jump course.
- International Shooting course.
- Small Arms shooting course.
- Snipers' teaching course.
- Guarding and terrorism countering course.
- Advanced Infantry course from the United States.
- Regional Security challenges course from the United States.
- Military Diplomacy course from Geneva Centre for Security Policy.

== Main Commands ==
- Commander of (Platoon, Company, Battalion).
- Member of the teaching staff in the infantry institute.
- Military observer in the United Nations.
- Military Attaché in Abu Dhabi, UAE.

== Orders, decorations and medals ==
- Military Duty Decoration, First Class.
- Longevity & Exemplary Medal.
- Silver Jubilee of October War Medal.
- Golden Jubilee of the 23rd of July Revolution.
- Silver Jubilee of The Liberation Of Sinai Medal.
- 25 January Revolution Medal.
- United Nations Medal.
- Physical efficiency Medal from the US Army.

Military offices
Preceded by Ahmed Mohammed Ali	Spokesperson of the Egyptian Armed Forces; 2014–present	Succeeded by Incumbent
