= Morale Affairs Department =

Department of the Egyptian Armed Forces

Moral Affairs Department
- إدارة الشئون المعنوية للقوات المسلحة المصرية
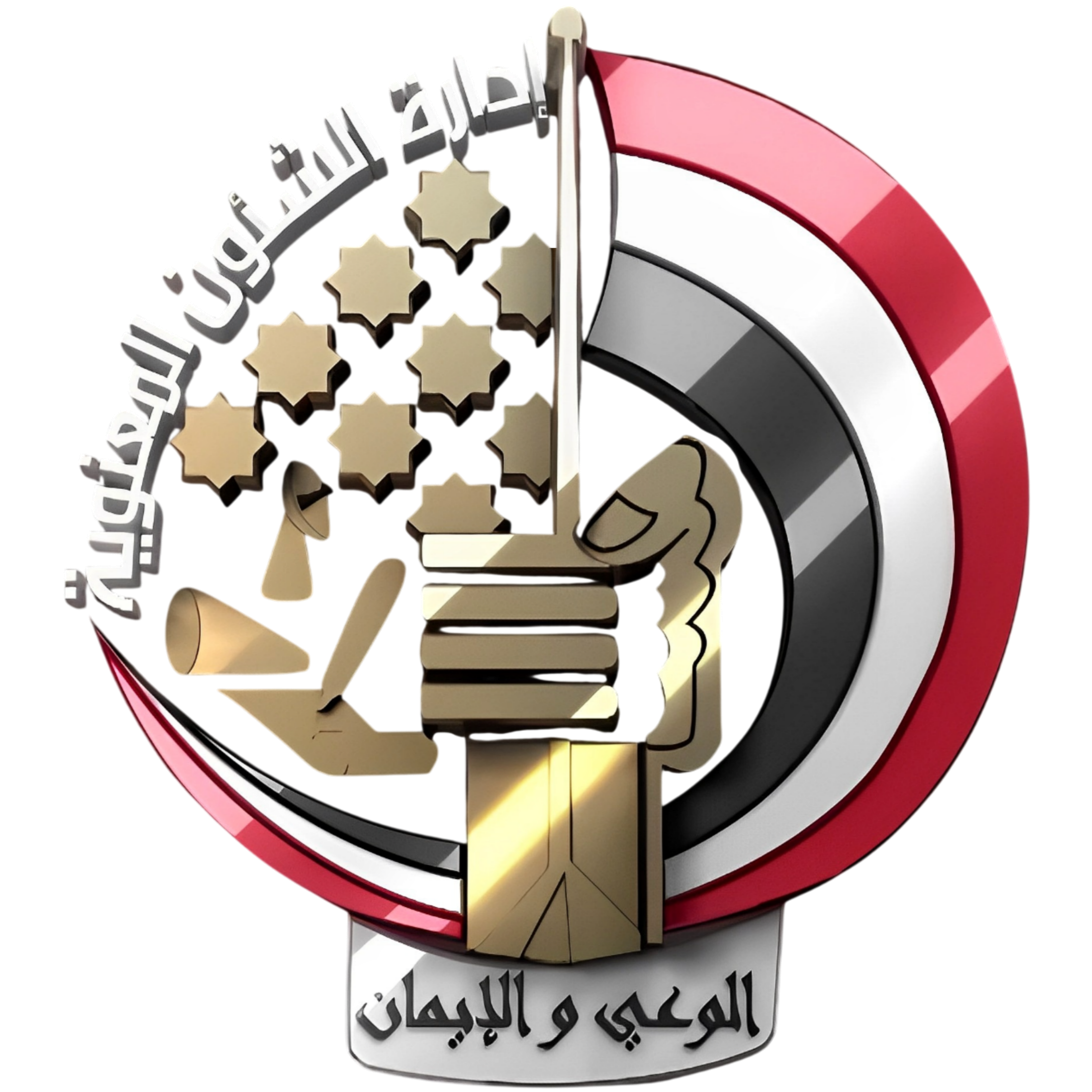
- Official emblem

Agency overview
- Formed: 1930s
- Motto: Awareness And Faith
- Parent agency: Egyptian Armed Forces
- Website: https://afmad.mod.gov.eg/

Morale Affairs Department is an Egyptian military department. It is responsible for the media and psychological centers of the Egyptian Armed Forces, which specializes in several tasks including psychological insurance for members of the armed forces to protect them from any deviation, and making recommendations in order to be all individuals in good spirits and do not affect the performance of combat.

The Morale Affairs Department carries out studies for public leadership help to identify the positive and negative effects before or after making a decision. Also collaborated in the development of skills and abilities and intellectual leadership of the leaders in the various levels, especially those with special tasks. And cooperation in the proper selection of leaders and individuals to assume positions of process by the job description.
