= Egyptian Air Defense College =

Scientific college of the Egyptian Military Academy

Coordinates: 31.271967°N 30.104449°E

The Egyptian Air Defenses College (Arabic: كلية الدفاع الجوي), is a scientific college in the Egyptian Military Academy, with the target of supplying the Egyptian Armed Forces with its need of the professional engineers. It was established in 1974.

Graduates of the Air Defenses College get commissioned as officers in the Egyptian Air Defense Command. The current director of the Egyptian Air Defense College is Staff Major General Mohamed Ibrahim El-Rifai.

== Academic Objectives ==
The goal of the Egyptian Air Defense College is to prepare a qualified, scientifically militant officer, capable of commanding a sub unit with high physical fitness as well as utilizing technologically advanced Air Defense weapons in order to keep up with modern airwar methods.

Upon Graduation;

- Bachelor's degree of Air Defense sciences after the completion of the fourth educational year.
- Bachelor's degree of Engineering in communications and Electronics section after the completion of the fifth educational year.

== Organization ==
The college is divided into four main sections:

- The first section

The college administration which is responsible for training, planning and following up under the supervision of the college commandant.

- The Second Section

It includes the following educational branches

  - Engineering Science branch

Is equipped with modern laboratories that serve the Engineering study and allow the cadets to do the engineering experiments with the rate of 4 cadets for each experiment.

  - Air Defence specialize branches

Cadets receive an academic and practical training on the Air Defence Equipment in these branches.

  - General Training branch

It is responsible for adapting cadets to military life and teaching them military sciences.

- The third section

It is responsible for the college logistics and providing it with its administrative needs.

- The fourth section

It contains the cadet brigade formation that is responsible for cadets discipline and providing their needs.
