= Youssef Sabri Abu Taleb =

Egyptian politician (1929–2008)

Yousef Sabri Abu Taleb Giad Al-Haq

Minister of Defence of Egypt
- In office April 1989 – May 1991
- President: Hosni Mubarak
- Prime Minister: Atef Sedki
- Preceded by: Abd al-Halim Abu Ghazala
- Succeeded by: Mohamed Hussein Tantawi

Personal details
- Born: 24 May 1929
- Died: 29 September 2008 (aged 79)
- Party: Independent

Military service
- Allegiance: Egypt
- Branch/service: Egyptian Army
- Years of service: 1948–1991
- Rank: Colonel General
- Commands: Commander-in-Chief of the Armed Forces
- Battles/wars: 1948 Palestine war; Suez Crisis; Six-Day War; Yom Kippur War; Gulf War

Youssef Sabri Abu Taleb Giad Al-Haq (Arabic: يوسف صبري أبوطالب جادالحق; May 1929 – 29 September 2008) was an Egyptian colonel general and the Commander-in-Chief of the Armed Forces.

== Military career ==
Abu Taleb participated in five wars from the 1948 Palestine war until the gulf war. He also served in Egypt's wars with Israel, and commanded the Third Army's artillery at Suez in the 1973 war, when Israeli forces encircled the city. And, like his predecessor, he graduated from Cairo's military academy, then trained in the United States and the Soviet Union before President Sadat broke with Moscow in the early 1970s. He served briefly as Assistant Defense Minister in 1979.

== Public career ==
Abu Taleb became governor of Cairo in 1983. He won popularity as Governor of Cairo because of improvements in the telephone system, efforts to ease congestion and moves to clean up the city. He was also the Governor of North Sinai where he contributed to the rebuilding of the governorate after the war.

In 1989, then president Hosni Mubarak appointed Abu Taleb to the influential post of minister of defense, replacing Field Marshal Abd al-Halim Abu Ghazala.

Military offices
Preceded by Abd al-Halim Abu Ghazala	Commander-in-Chief of the Armed Forces; April 1989 – May 1991	Succeeded by Mohamed Hussein Tantawi
Political offices
Preceded by Abd al-Halim Abu Ghazala	Minister of Defence; April 1989 – May 1991	Succeeded by Mohamed Hussein Tantawi
