= Muhammad Hussein Tantawy =

Egyptian Field marshal and former statesman (1935–2021)

Field Marshal Hussein Tantawi
- حسين طنطاوي
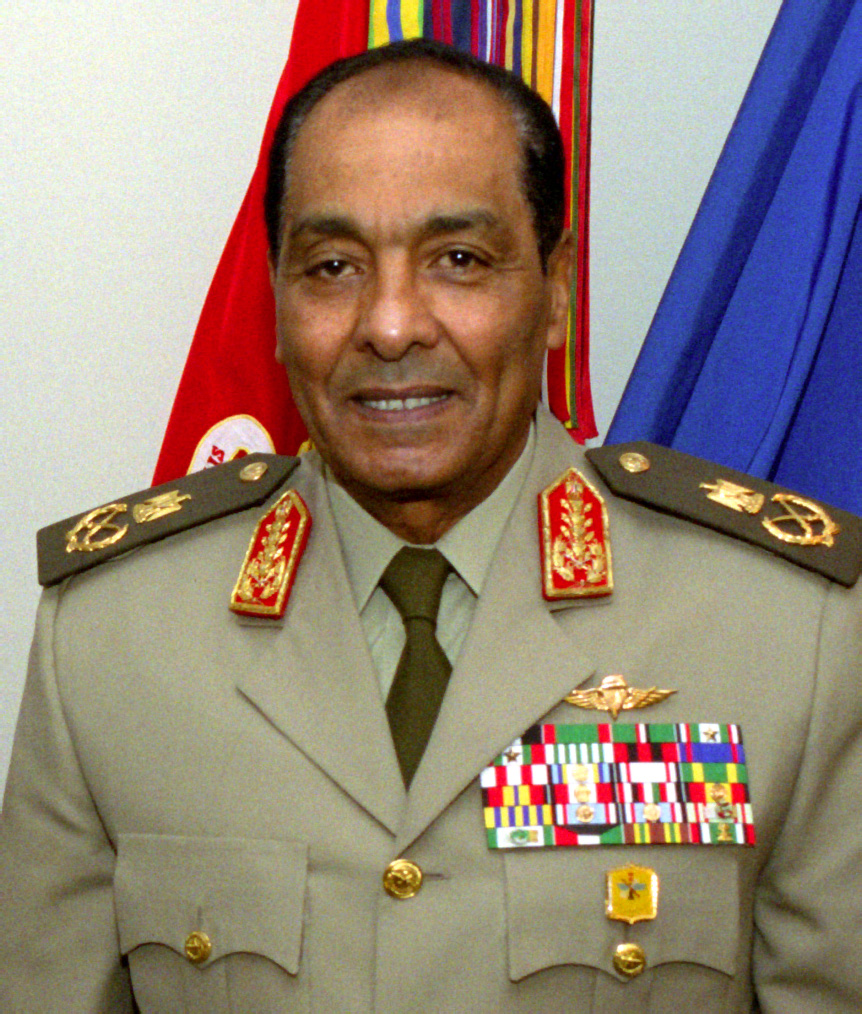
- Tantawi in 2002

Chairman of the Supreme Council of the Armed Forces
- In office 11 February 2011 – 30 June 2012
- Prime Minister: Ahmed Shafik; Essam Sharaf; Kamal Ganzouri
- Deputy: Sami Anan
- Preceded by: Hosni Mubarak (as President)
- Succeeded by: Mohamed Morsi (as President)

Secretary General of the Non-Aligned Movement
- In office 11 February 2011 – 30 June 2012
- Preceded by: Hosni Mubarak
- Succeeded by: Mohamed Morsi

Minister of Defense and Military Production
- In office 20 May 1991 – 12 August 2012
- Prime Minister: Atef Sedki; Kamal Ganzouri; Atef Ebeid; Ahmed Nazif; Ahmed Shafik; Essam Sharaf; Kamal Ganzouri; Hesham Qandil
- Preceded by: Sabri Abu Taleb
- Succeeded by: Abdel Fattah el-Sisi

Personal details
- Born: 31 October 1935 Cairo, Egypt
- Died: 21 September 2021 (aged 85) Cairo, Egypt
- Party: Independent
- Education: Egyptian Military Academy
- Awards: Liberation Order; United Arab Republic Anniversary Order; Distinguished Service Order; Order of the Nile

Military service
- Allegiance: Egypt
- Branch/service: Egyptian Army
- Years of service: 1955–2012
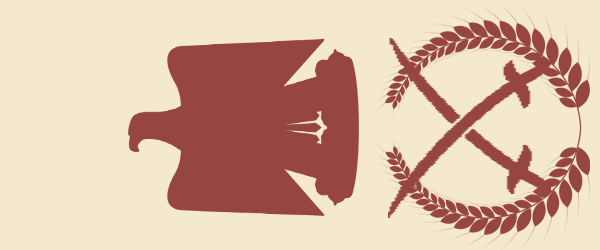
- Rank: Field Marshal
- Commands: Commander-in-Chief of the Armed Forces
- Battles/wars: Suez Crisis; North Yemen Civil War; Six-Day War; War of Attrition; Yom Kippur War; Gulf War; Sinai insurgency; 2011 Egyptian revolution

Muhammad Hussein Tantawi Soliman (Arabic: محمد حسين طنطاوي سليمان, romanized: Muḥammad Ḥusayn Ṭanṭāwī Sulaymān; 31 October 1935 – 21 September 2021) was an Egyptian military officer and politician. He was the commander-in-chief of the Egyptian Armed Forces and, as chairman of the Supreme Council of the Armed Forces, was the de facto head of state from the ousting of President Hosni Mubarak on 11 February 2011 until the inauguration of Mohamed Morsi as president of Egypt on 30 June 2012.

Tantawi served in the government as Minister of Defense and Military Production from 1991 until Morsi discharged him on 12 August 2012.

== Military career ==
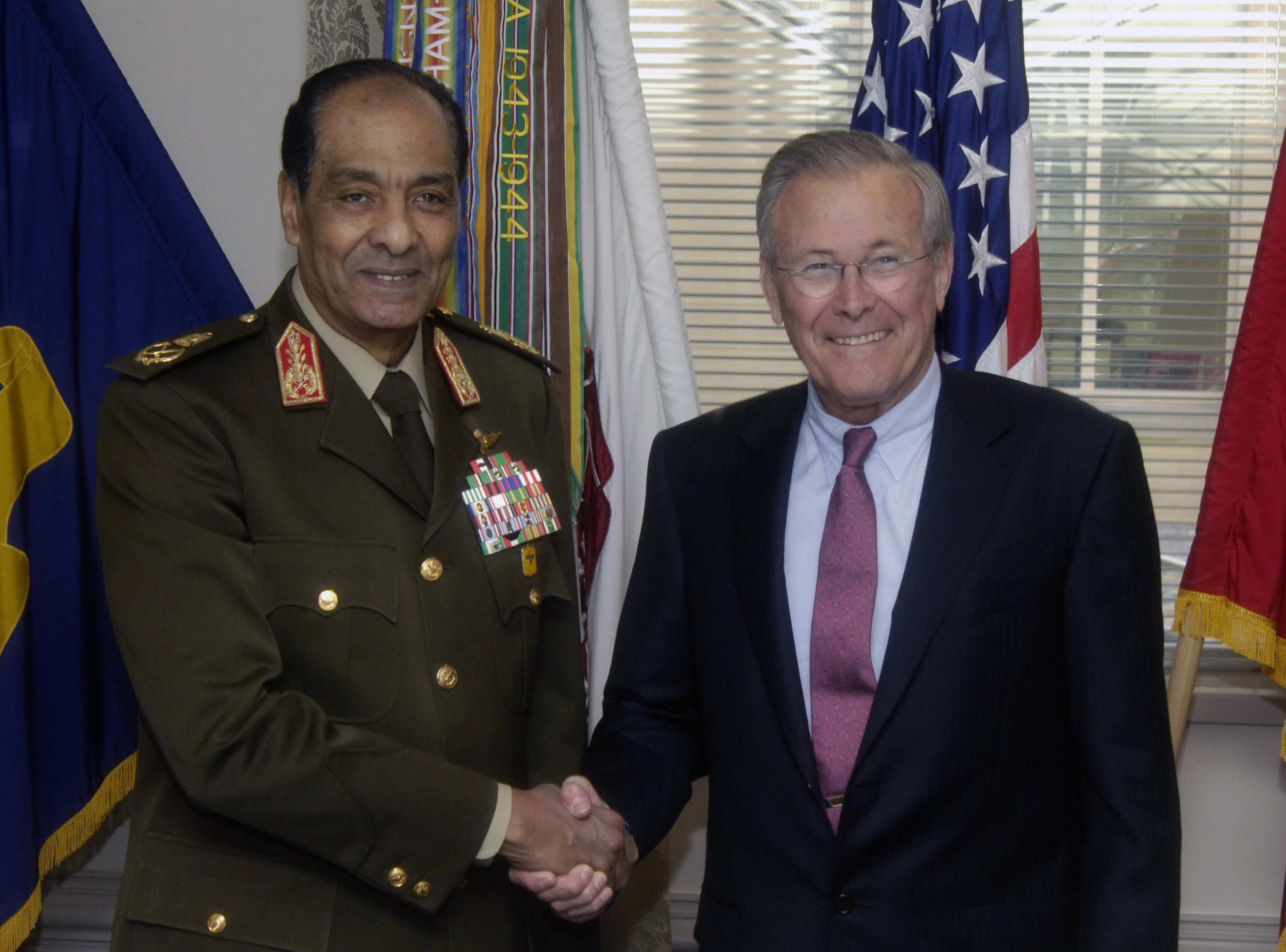
Field Marshal Tantawi with U.S. Defense Secretary Donald Rumsfeld, 7 March 2006

Tantawi, who was of Nubian origin, joined the Egyptian Military Academy in 1952 and received his commission as an Army officer on 1 April 1955 in the infantry. The following year he took part in the Suez War (or the Tripartite Aggression as it is often known in Egypt) as an infantry platoon commander. He was promoted to major in 1961 and commanded an infantry company in Yemen during the North Yemen Civil War. Later in his career he was involved in the Six-Day War of 1967 as a mechanized infantry battalion commander, the War of Attrition of 1967–1970, and the October or Yom Kippur War of 1973. During the Yom Kippur War he was a lieutenant colonel commanding the 16th mechanized infantry battalion. Additionally he served as a military attaché to Pakistan between 1983 and 1985, an important role given the two countries' political and military links. After that he was appointed as mechanized brigade commander and then a division commander. As a major general, Tantawi served as a Commander of the Second Field Army between 1986 and 1989. Then he was appointed as the Commander of the Republican Guard Forces between 1989 and 1991, and later a Chief of the Operations Authority of the Armed Forces. In 1991, he also commanded an Egyptian Army unit in the U.S.-led Gulf War against Iraq to force Iraq to withdraw from Kuwait, which it had invaded in 1990.

On 29 May 1991, following the dismissal of General. Youssef Sabri Abu Taleb, Tantawi was promoted to lieutenant general and appointed minister of defense and military production and commander-in-chief of the Egyptian Armed Forces. After one month he was promoted to general rank, which he held for two years before being promoted to field marshal, the highest rank in the Egyptian military, in 1993. It is believed that Tantawi would have succeeded Mubarak as President of Egypt had the assassination attempt in June 1995 been successful. Early in 2011, Tantawi was seen as a possible contender for the Egyptian presidency.

== Egyptian Revolution ==
On 11 February 2011, when President Hosni Mubarak resigned, after 18 days of protests from the Egyptian people, Field Marshal Tantawi transferred authority to the Supreme Council of the Armed Forces, headed by himself. The council, overseeing issues with the Chairman of the Supreme Constitutional Court, Farouk Sultan, dissolved the Egyptian parliament, oversaw the referendum over temporary constitutional amendments which took place on 19 March, and presided over summons to justice, for accountability, of Air Chief Marshal Mubarak and many of the former regime's top figures.

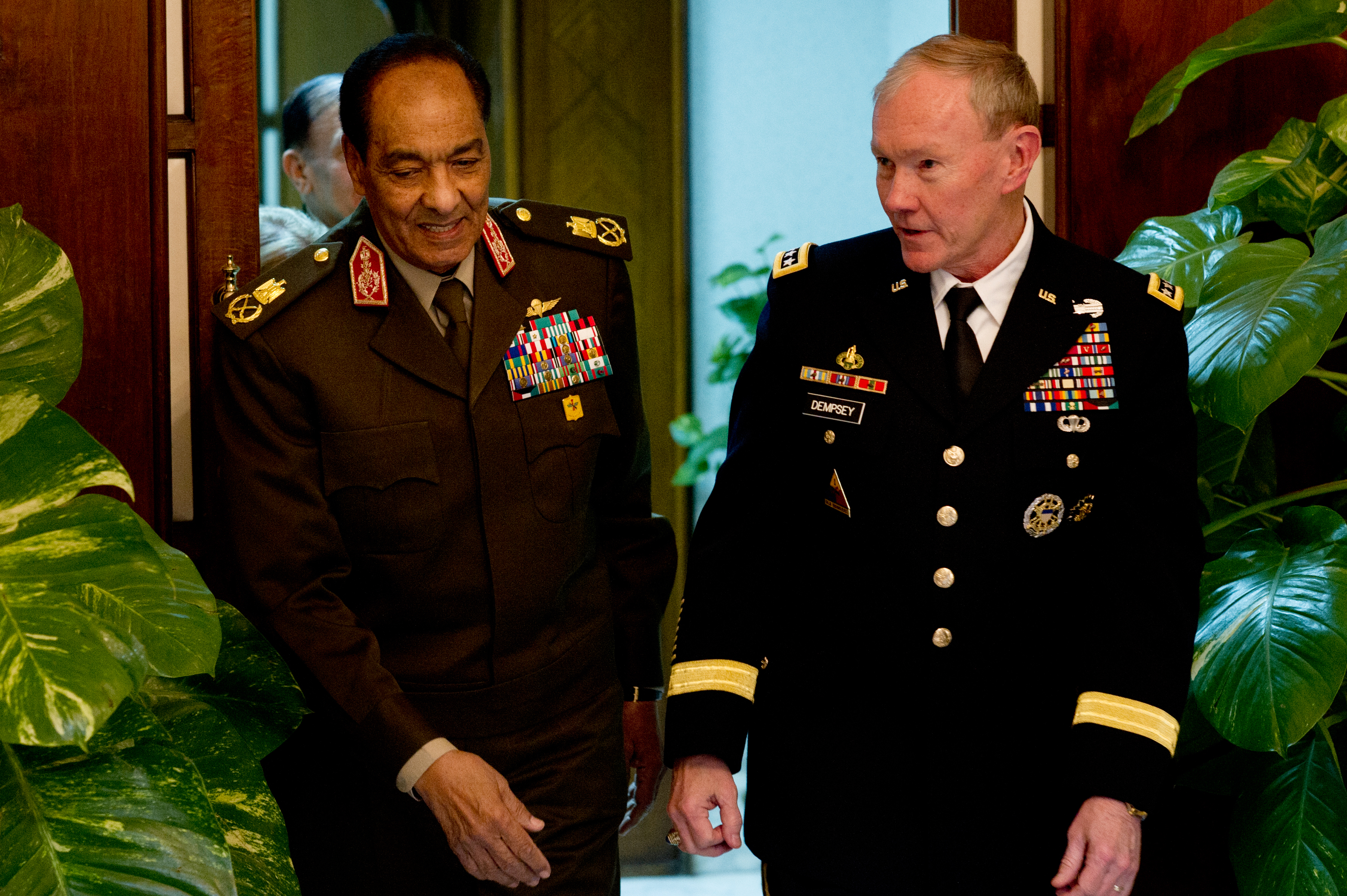
Field Marshal Tantawi with U.S. Army General Martin Dempsey, Chairman of the Joint Chiefs of Staff, 11 February 2012

On a personal level, Tantawi kept a relatively low profile since the handing over of power to the council, only making a first public appearance in an address to mark the graduation of a batch at the Police Academy on 16 May 2011. He opted to leave most public speeches and press releases to other senior members in the council; he also appointed Prime Minister Essam Sharaf and his cabinet. Tantawi also received a number of foreign officials, including British Prime Minister David Cameron and U.S. Secretary of State Hillary Clinton.

After a new series of protests in November 2011, that escalated by 22 November to over 33 dead and over 2,000 injured in the wake of the use of force by the police to quell protests at Tahrir Square and its vicinity, Tantawi appeared on Egyptian national television to pledge the speeding up of presidential elections – the principal demand of protesters – and that the armed forces "are fully prepared to immediately hand over power and to return to their original duty in protecting the homeland if that's what the people want, through a popular referendum if necessary."

On 12 August 2012, Egypt's president Mohamed Morsi ordered Tantawi to retire as head of the armed forces and defence minister. Tantawi was decorated with the Order of the Nile and appointed, instead, as an advisor to Morsi; there was speculation that his removal was part of a pre-arranged withdrawal by the military from political power in exchange for immunity from prosecution for earlier actions.

== Criticism ==
Criticism of Field Marshal Tantawi in Egypt was manyfold, including many chants in Tahrir for him to leave. Chants against Tantawi included "Tantawi stripped your women naked, come join us." Protesters also "demanded the execution of Tantawi."

Nabeel Rajab, the head of Bahrain Centre for Human Rights, criticized Tantawi for his reception for Hamad bin Isa Al Khalifa, King of Bahrain, in October 2011. "This is a very bad message from the Supreme Council of the Armed Forces to the international community, the Egyptian and Bahraini people", he said. "Continuing this path threatens Egypt's democratic future", he added.

== Death ==
Tantawi died on 21 September 2021, following a period of ill health.

== Medals and decorations ==
=== Military ===
- October War 1973 Medal
- October War 1973 Combatants Medal
- Wounded of War Medal
- Longevity and Exemplary Service Medal
- Kuwait Liberation Medal (Egypt)
- Silver Jubilee of October War 1973 Medal (1998)
- Silver Jubilee of Liberation of Sinai Medal (2007)
- 25 January 2011 Revolution Medal
- Army Day Medal
- Golden Jubilee of 23rd 1952 Revolution Medal (2002)
- 23 July 1952 Revolution 10th Anniversary Medal (1962)
- 23 July 1952 Revolution 20th Anniversary Medal (1972)
- Liberation of Sinai Decoration (25 April 1982)
- Military Duty Decoration, First Class
- Distinguished Service Decoration
- Military Courage Decoration
- Commemorative Decoration of Establishment of the United Arab Republic
- Military Decoration of Independence
- Liberation Decoration (officers)
- Military Decoration of Evacuation
- Victory Decoration
- The Republic's Military Decoration
- Training Decoration, First Class

=== Civil ===
- Grand Collar of the Order of the Nile
- Grand Cordon of the Order of the Republic (Egypt)
- Grand Cross of the Order of Merit (Egypt)
- Grand Cordon of the Order of the Virtues (Egypt)

=== Foreign honors ===
- Saudi Arabia: Grand Cordon of the Order of King Abdulaziz
- Saudi Arabia: Special Class of the Kuwait Liberation Medal (Saudi Arabia)
- Kuwait: First Class of the Kuwait Liberation Medal
- Mauritania: Grand Cordon of the Order of National Merit
- Pakistan: Grand Cordon of the Nishan-e-Imtiaz
- Portugal: Grand Cross of the Order of Prince Henry
- Tunisia: Commander of the Order of the Republic
- United Kingdom: Knight of the Order of St Michael and St George

Military offices
Preceded by Youssef Sabri Abu Taleb	Commander-in-Chief of the Armed Forces; 1991–2012	Succeeded by Abdel Fattah el-Sisi
Preceded by Hosni Mubarak as President of Egypt	Chairman of the Supreme Council of the Armed Forces of Egypt; 2011–2012	Succeeded by SCAF dissolved
Political offices
Preceded by Youssef Sabri Abu Taleb	Minister of Defense and Military Production; 1991–2012	Succeeded by Abdel Fattah el-Sisi
Preceded by Hosni Mubarak as President of Egypt	Head of state of Egypt; 2011–2012	Succeeded by Mohamed Morsi as President of Egypt
Diplomatic posts
Preceded by Hosni Mubarak	Secretary General of the Non-Aligned Movement; 2011–2012	Succeeded by Mohamed Morsi
