= Sedki Sobhy =

Egyptian general (born 1955)

General Sedki Sobhy
- صدقي صبحي
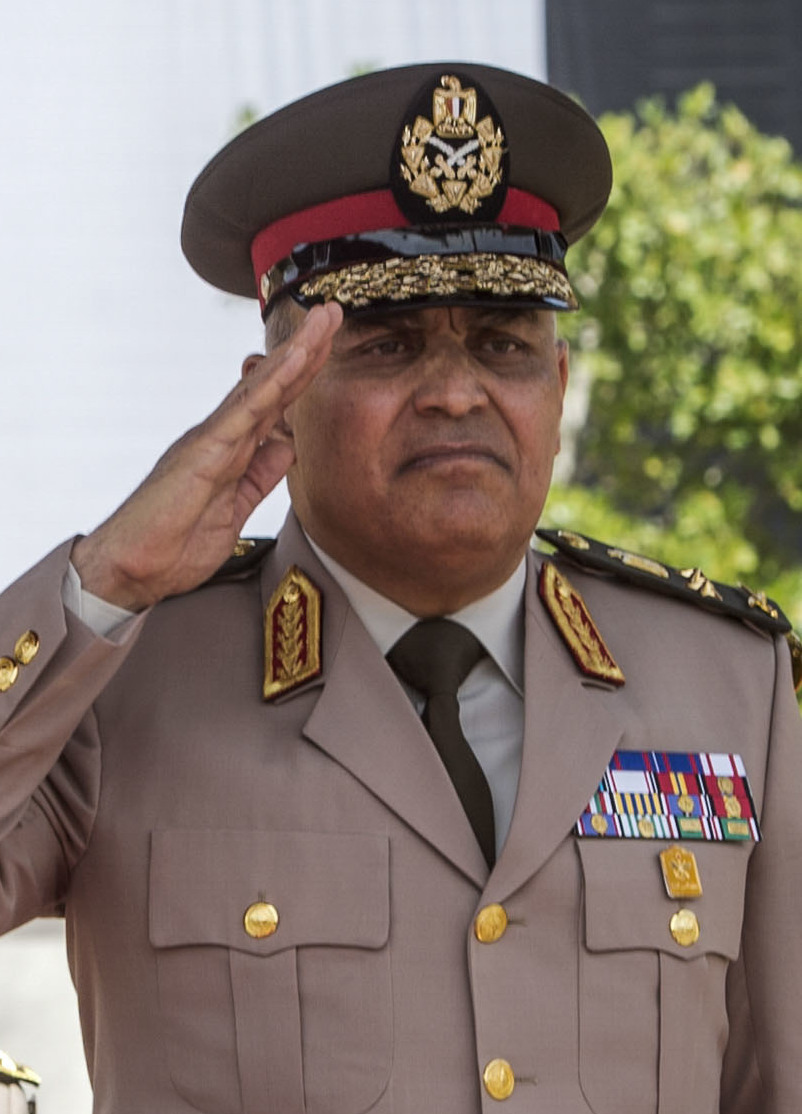

45th Minister of Defence
- In office 26 March 2014 – 14 June 2018
- President: Adly Mansour (Interim); Abdel Fattah el-Sisi
- Prime Minister: Ibrahim Mahlab; Sherif Ismail
- Preceded by: Abdel Fattah el-Sisi
- Succeeded by: Mohamed Ahmed Zaki

Commander-In-Chief of the Armed Forces
- In office 26 March 2014 – 14 June 2018
- President: Adly Mansour (Acting); Abdel Fattah el-Sisi
- Prime Minister: Ibrahim Mahlab; Sherif Ismail; Mostafa Madbouly
- Preceded by: Abdel Fattah el-Sisi
- Succeeded by: Mohamed Ahmed Zaki

Chief of Staff of the Armed Forces
- In office 12 August 2012 – 26 March 2014
- President: Mohamed Morsi; Adly Mansour (Acting)
- Commander: Abdel Fattah el-Sisi
- Preceded by: Sami Hafez Anan
- Succeeded by: Mahmoud Hegazy

Personal details
- Born: 12 December 1955 (age 70) Menouf, Republic of Egypt
- Party: Independent

Military service
- Allegiance: Egypt
- Branch/service: Egyptian Army
- Years of service: 1976–2018
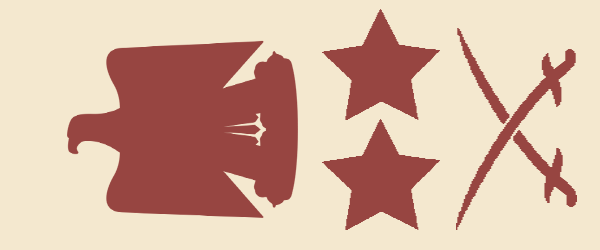
- Rank: General
- Battles/wars: Gulf War; Sinai Insurgency; 2015 Egyptian military intervention in Libya; Intervention in Yemen

Sedki Sobhy Sayyid Ahmad (Egyptian Arabic: صدقى صبحى سيد أحمد pronounced [ˈsˤedʔi ˈsˤobħi ˈsæj.jed ˈæħmæd]; born 12 December 1955) is an Egyptian politician and former General who was Minister of Defence of Egypt from 2014 until 2018. Sobhy previously served as the Chief of Staff of the Armed Forces from August 2012 to March 2014. He was sworn in as Minister of Defence in March 2014 after Abdul Fattah al-Sisi resigned so he could stand for the presidency. He also commanded the Third Army for a time.

== Military education ==
- Bachelor of military sciences, Egyptian Military Academy
- The Advanced course, Egyptian Military Academy
- The sophisticated course, Egyptian Military Academy
- M.A. of Military sciences, Egyptian Joint Command and staff college
- War Course, Fellowship of the Higher War College, Nasser's Military Sciences Academy
- Basic Infantry scholarship, United States
- Advanced Infantry scholarship, United States
- Training planning course, United States
- War Course, US Army War College, United States
- Multinational forces course, Germany

== Main commands ==
- Mechanized Infantry Battalion, Commander.
- Mechanized Infantry Brigade, Chief of staff.
- Mechanized Infantry Brigade, Commander.
- Mechanized Infantry Division, Chief of Staff.
- Mechanized Infantry Division, commander.
- Third Army, Chief, Operations branch.
- Third Army, Chief of Staff.
- Third Army, Commander.

== Connections with the United States ==
In 2004–2005 Sedki Sobhy studied for a Master's Degree in Strategic Studies at the US Army War College in Carlisle, Pennsylvania. While there he wrote a paper recommending that the United States withdraw its military from the Middle East and concentrate instead on socio-economic aid for the region. The paper was posted on a US Department of Defense website, where it was noticed by analyst Issandr El Amrani.

After the 2013 Egyptian coup, Sedki Sobhy spoke by telephone on 4 July 2013 with Martin Dempsey, US Chairman of the Joint Chiefs of Staff, and had spoken twice with him by 8 July.

== Medals and decorations ==
- 25 April Decoration (Liberation of Sinai)
- Distinguished Service Decoration
- Military Duty Decoration, Second Class
- Military Duty Decoration, First Class
- Longevity and Exemplary Medal
- Liberation of Kuwait Medal
- Silver Jubilee of October War Medal
- Golden Jubilee of the 23rd of July Revolution
- Silver Jubilee of the Liberation of Sinai Medal
- 25 January Revolution Medal

Military offices
Preceded by Abdel Fattah el-Sisi	Chairman of the Supreme Council of the Armed Forces of Egypt; 2014–present	Incumbent
Preceded by Abdel Fattah el-Sisi	Commander-in-Chief of the Egyptian Armed Forces; 2014–present	Incumbent
Political offices
Preceded by Abdel Fattah el-Sisi	Minister of Defence; 2014–2018	Succeeded by Mohamed Ahmed Zaki
