= JLG-43 Radar =

The JLG-43 radar is a nodding height finding radar, a two-dimensional (2D) radar which only provides azimuth and height data and is normally paired with other air search radars which provides the range to complete the picture. It is very similar to the well-known Russian PRV-9 "Thin Skin" and PRV-11 "Side Net" series heightfinding radars. It is a fully mobile system which can be towed and is air transportable.

The radar have been in production by the Chengdu Jin Jiang Electronic System Engineering Company/成都锦江电子系统工程有限公司 for a number of years and the latest version is the JLG-43C.

== Specifications ==
- S band
- Pulsewidth: 3 μs
- Peak Power: 2 MW
- Range: 200 km
- Height: 25,000 metres
- Elevation coverage: 0–30°
- Accuracy: 300 metres, 2° (azimuth)
