= Military ranks of Egypt =

The Military ranks of Egypt are the military insignia used by the Egyptian Armed Forces. Egypt has a uniform system similar to the United Kingdom, with rank insignia being similar across the different services.

== Commissioned officer ranks ==
The rank insignia of commissioned officers.

Rank group	General / flag officers					Senior officers			Junior officers
Egyptian Army
Egyptian Army	مشیر; Mushir	فريق أول; Fariq 'awal	فريق; Fariq	لواء; Liwa	عميد; Amid	عقيد; Aqid	مقدم; Muqaddam	رائد; Ra'id	نقيب; Naqib	ملازم أول; Mulazim awwal	ملازم; Mulazim
Navy collar
Egyptian Navy
Egyptian Navy		فريق أول; Fariq 'awal	فريق; Fariq	لواء; Liwa	عميد; Amid	عقيد; Aqid	مقدم; Muqaddam	رائد; Ra'id	نقيب; Naqib	ملازم أول; Mulazim awwal	ملازم; Mulazim
Egyptian Air Force
Egyptian Air Force		فريق أول; Fariq 'awal	فريق; Fariq	لواء; Liwa	عميد; Amid	عقيد; Aqid	مقدم; Muqaddam	رائد; Ra'id	نقيب; Naqib	ملازم أول; Mulazim awwal	ملازم; Mulazim
Egyptian Air Defense Forces
Egyptian Air Defense Forces			فريق; Fariq	لواء; Liwa	عميد; Amid	عقيد; Aqid	مقدم; Muqaddam	رائد; Ra'id	نقيب; Naqib	ملازم أول; Mulazim awwal	ملازم; Mulazim
Rank group	General / flag officers					Senior officers			Junior officers

== Other ranks ==
The rank insignia of non-commissioned officers and enlisted personnel.

Rank group	Senior NCOs				Junior NCOs	Enlisted
Egyptian Army
Egyptian Army	مساعد أول; Mosa'id awwal	مساعد; Mosa'id	رقيب أول; Raqib awwal	رقيب; Raqib	عريف 'arif	جندي; Jundi
Egyptian Navy
Egyptian Navy	مساعد أول; Mosa'id awwal	مساعد; Mosa'id	رقيب أول; Raqib awwal	رقيب; Raqib	عريف 'arif	جندي; Jundi
Egyptian Air Force
Egyptian Air Force	مساعد أول; Mosa'id awwal	مساعد; Mosa'id	رقيب أول; Raqib awwal	رقيب; Raqib	عريف 'arif	جندي; Jundi
Egyptian Air Defense Forces
Egyptian Air Defense Forces	مساعد أول; Mosa'id awwal	مساعد; Mosa'id	رقيب أول; Raqib awwal	رقيب; Raqib	عريف 'arif	جندي; Jundi
Rank group	Senior NCOs				Junior NCOs	Enlisted

== History ==
The Egyptian military ranks were changed after the revolution of 1952 and the fall of the monarchy. In the year 1958 the crown was replaced by the Eagle of Saladin (also known as "The Egyptian Eagle"; "Ancient Egyptian Eagle", and is the new coat of arms) and formal-Arabic language ranks.
