= Egyptian police casualties since 2011 =

Officers and members of the Egyptian police

Post Egyptian revolution violence
- Part of Egyptian Crisis (2011–present)
Location	2011-present
Status	ongoing

Belligerents
Egypt: Central Security Forces; Homeland Security; National Police	Islamist militants: Ansar Bait al-Maqdis; Unknown armed groups; (Egypt) Local criminals

Commanders and leaders
(Egypt) Mahmoud Wagdy (Jan 2011 - Mar 2011) (Egypt) Mansour el-Essawy (Mar 2011 - Nov 2011) (Egypt) Mohamed Youssef (Dec 2011 - Aug 2012) (Egypt) Ahmed Gamal (Aug 2012 - Jan 2013) (Egypt) Mohamed Ibrahim (Jan 2013 - Present)	unknown

Casualties and losses
(Egypt) 500+	unknown

Since the Egyptian revolution in 2011, officers and members of the Egyptian police have suffered targeted killings executed by extremist militant groups such as Ansar Bait al-Maqdis and other local criminals and unknown gunmen. As of December 2013, 500 policemen have been killed in attacks since 2011.

== Casualties ==
- Hamed Mohamed Sabry al-Far, killed on 28 January 2011.
- Mustafa Abdel-Moneim Abdel-Latif, killed on 28 January 2011 in Sinai.
- Mohamed Suleiman slama, killed on 30 January 2011.
- Mohamed Ali Abdul Aziz Mohammed, killed on 31 January 2011.
- Abdullah Mohamed al-Henawy, killed on 2 June 2011.
- Khaled Abdelkader Mohamed, killed on 2 June 2011.
- Hosny al-sayed Honsy, killed on 2 June 2011.
- Sameh Ibrahim Tahoun, killed on 1 June 2011.
- Abdel Nasser Mahmoud Ashour, killed on 29 May 2011.
- Hisham Refaat Husseini, killed on 4 May 2011.
- Ramadan Sayed Mohammed Abdel Latif, killed on 28 March 2011.
- Eid Mohammed Fathy Hassan, killed on 24 February 2011.
- Tareq Abu Saree' Ramadan Shaban, killed on 24 February 2011 in Sinai.
- Abdullah Hareedy Mohammed, killed on 17 February 2011.
- Mohammed Hosni Ibrahim Mohammed, killed on 22 June 2011 in Sinai.
- Amr Ibrahim Mohamed, killed on 21 November 2011 in Sinai.
- Hisham Safwat Abdel Aziz al-Mahdi, killed on 29 August 2011.
- Hassan Ibrahim Hassan, killed on 20 August 2011 in Sinai after being shot by Israeli helicopters.
- Ibrahim Abdullah Abdul Rahman Khalifa, killed on 4 June 2012 in Sinai.
- Mohamed Nassef, killed on 16 May 2012.
- Mahmoud Mohamed Sabry, killed on 2 May 2012 in Sinai.
- Mohammed Abdul Latif Abdul Jawad, killed on 15 April 2012 in Sinai.
- Mohamed Fawzy al-Saadany, killed on 15 April 2012 in Sinai.
- Mohammed Mosleh, killed on 15 April 2012 in Sinai.
- Nabil Omar Mohammed Omar, killed on 16 March 2012 in Sinai.
- Mahmoud Eid Mahmoud Ghoneim Ibrahim, killed on 4 February 2012.
- Al-Sayed Mohamed Abdel 'al Faraj, killed on 4 February 2012.
