= Hasm Movement =

Islamist militant group operating in Egypt

- حركة حسم
- Logo of the Hasm Movement
- Dates active: 2016 – present
- Active regions: Egypt
- Ideology: Sunni Islamism; Egyptian nationalism
- Size: 304 (2017)
- Part of: Muslim Brotherhood (alleged)
- Wars: Insurgency in Egypt (2013–present)

The Arms of Egypt Movement (Arabic: حركة سواعد مِصر, romanized: Ḥarakat Sāwa'd Miṣr), commonly known as the Hasm Movement (Arabic: حركة حسم, romanized: Ḥarakat Ḥasm), is an Islamist militant group operating in Egypt.

The group despite having little uptime, has shown to have a very advanced organization and deployment which has led the security forces to link them with the Muslim Brotherhood.

== History ==
=== 2016 ===
On 16 July 2016 militants opened fire on a police vehicle in Tamiyyah, Faiyum, killing one officer and two were wounded in the attack. On 5 August, the Hasm Movement claimed responsibility for an assassination attempt on the former Grand Mufti of Egypt Ali Gomaa.

On 4 September conscripts of the Central Security Forces were wounded after they tried to defuse an improvised device in the city of Damietta. The Hasm Movement claimed this attack. Four days later, militants shot dead and robbed a police officer, in Sixth of October city, Giza. Weeks later (29 September), the Hasm movement attempted to kill Zakaria Abdel Aziz, a senior assistant to Egypt's top prosecutor, as he was returning home from his office in eastern Cairo. The bomb failed to kill or hurt Aziz and his entourage, though one passerby was injured and taken to hospital. Days later, militants killed a police officer near his house in El Mahmoudiyah, Beheira Governorate.

On 4 November 2016, the Hasm movement claimed responsibility for an assassination attempt on judge Ahmed Aboul Fotouh in Nasr City. Fotouh was one of three judges who sentenced former Islamist President Mohamed Morsi to twenty years in prison in 2015.

On 9 December 2016, the Hasm Movement claimed responsibility for an attack on a checkpoint on a main road near the Giza pyramid complex on the outskirts of Cairo, which killed six police officers.

=== 2017 ===
Militants opened fire on an Egyptian National Police (ENP) vehicle in Ibsheway, Faiyum, leaving one officer killed and other wounded.

On 27 March 2017, assailants shot and killed a police officer in the village of Basarta, Damietta. Weeks later, security officers shot dead the possible attacker responsible for the murder, in the operation, two officers were wounded. During the next months the movement continued with his armed activity

On 1 May, militants attacked a convoy of ENP agents killing three officers and wounded other five, this attack were in Nasr City, Cairo. On 18 June, an explosive device blasts and opened fire on a police vehicle in Maadi neighborhood, Cairo. The attack left and the group stated that the attack was carried out in retaliation for the Egyptian government transferring ownership of two islands to Saudi Arabia.

On 30 September 2017 a small bomb detonated at the embassy of Myanmar in Cairo. There were no casualties. Initially the bombing was reported as a faulty gas-pipeline only a police investigation found remains of an explosive device. The Hasm Movement took responsibility for the attack, stating that it was in retaliation for actions of the government of Myanmar in the Rohingya Conflict. Myanmar's Government Spokesmen urged citizens abroad to be careful.

=== 2019 ===
The group was accused of being behind the 2019 Cairo explosion, which resulted in 20 deaths and 47 injured, but the group had denied the allegations.

On 11 April 2019, Egyptian government forces reportedly killed six members of the group in an armed confrontation, after discovering a plot to plant bombs in Giza, members of the group began shooting at police as they approached them for questioning resulting in a fire fight, after the fight several firearms and bomb making materials were discovered.

=== 2025 ===
On 20 July 2025 in Bulaq el‑Dakror, Giza, Egyptian police raided a Hasm Movement hideout. Two militants identified as Ahmed Mohamed Abdel Razek Ahmed Ghoneim and Ihab Abdel Latif Mohamed Abdel Qader were killed during a fierce exchange of fire. A police officer was injured in the action. Mostafa Anwar Ahmed Afifi, a 30‑year‑old electrical engineer who was on his way to dawn prayers, was killed by stray bullets. President Abdel Fattah el-Sisi ordered that his family be included in the national recognition and compensation fund for victims of terrorism.

== Arrests ==
Security forces arrested three people who were detained for possible involvement in the attack that occurred in December, that killed six officers.

== Designation as a terrorist group ==
- On 22 December 2017, the United Kingdom banned HASM as a 'proscribed terrorist organisation'.
- On 31 January 2018, the United States designated HASM as a 'Specially Designated Global Terrorist' entity. During May 2017, US authorities warned their citizens about the risks of possible attacks against authorities, civilians and tourists

== See also ==
- Al-Gama'a al-Islamiyya
- Terrorism in Egypt
- Muslim Brotherhood
