= 2019 Cairo bombing =

Terrorist incident in Cairo, Egypt

- Location: 30.0237°N 31.2307°E; Cairo, Egypt
- Date: 4 August 2019; Late evening
- Deaths: 20 (+1 attacker)
- Injuries: 47

On 4 August 2019, a car drove into three other cars outside the National Cancer Institute Egypt in central Cairo, Egypt. The collisions caused an explosion, killing at least 20 people and injuring at least 47 others. The next day, Mahmoud Tawfik the Interior Minister of Egypt, said that the car contained explosives and was to be used in a terrorist operation. The explosives-filled car was on its way to commit an attack in another part of the capital. Tawfik accused the Hasm Movement of carrying out the bombing, but the group denied the allegations.
