= Kholoud Said =

Egyptian researcher and translator

Kholoud Said is an Egyptian researcher and translator at the Great Library of Alexandria. She was arrested in April 2020 by Egyptian police after making a post on her Facebook criticising the government. Said was released in June 2022 after spending 25 months in pre-trial detention.

== Arrest and imprisonment ==
Just before midnight on 21 April 2020, armed security agents arrived her home, searched the house and took her laptop computer, mobile phone and writing materials and asked her to dress up and follow them to Al-montazah police station. The following day, security agents called her brother and ordered him to bring Said's computer charger to headquarters of the National Security Agency in Alexandria. She was held incommunicado at unknown location for eight days and appeared on 28 April at the State Security Prosecution where she was assigned Case No. 558/2020. Her arrest came a day after another activist and translator Marwa Arafa was arrested from her home without a warrant.

She was interrogated about her Facebook posts criticising the government and then accused of spreading false news, joining a terrorist group, and misusing a website with intent to commit crime. She was not arraigned for these crimes in court but was held in detention. Said was disappeared from the detention facility for about a month before being reappeared and charged in a new case with different crime.
