= Habib el-Adly =

Former Interior Minister of Egypt

Habib El-Adly
- حبيب العادلي

Minister of Interior of Egypt
- In office 18 November 1997 – 31 January 2011
- President: Hosni Mubarak
- Preceded by: Hassan Al Alfi
- Succeeded by: Mahmoud Wagdy

Personal details
- Born: Habib Ibrahim El-Adly; 1 March 1938 (age 88) Sharqiya Governorate, Egypt
- Party: National Democratic Party
- Military career
- Allegiance: Egypt
- Branch: Ministry of Interior (Egypt)
- Service years: 1959–1997
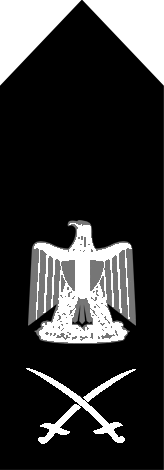
- Rank: Major General
- Unit: Egyptian police
- Commands: Imbaba Police Station; Zamalek Police Circle; Nasr City Police District; 2nd CSF Brigade; Qalyoubia Police Directorate; Cairo Police; Department of Personnel, Training and Education
- Other work: Politician

Habib Ibrahim El-Adly (Arabic: حبيب إبراهيم العادلي, pronounced [ħæˈbiːb ebɾɑˈhiːm elˈʕædli]; born 1 March 1938) is a former Egyptian politician. He served as interior minister of Egypt from November 1997 to January 2011. He was the longest serving interior minister under President Hosni Mubarak.

Following the 2011 Egyptian revolution, Adly was convicted of corruption and conspiring to kill protestors and was sentenced to life in prison. This conviction was later dropped.

== Early life and education ==
El-Adly was born in 1938. He graduated from the police academy in 1959.

== Career ==
In 1965, Adly joined the State Security Investigations Service. After working at various investigation departments, he was employed at the foreign ministry from 1982 to 1984. He then investigated state security matters, and became assistant interior minister in 1993. He replaced General Hassan Al Alfi as interior minister following the November 1997 Luxor massacre. Adly was one of the most significant figures who supported Mubarak during his reign.

Adly served as interior minister in two different cabinets. He was replaced by Mahmoud Wagdy on 31 January 2011 as part of a cabinet reshuffle aimed at appeasing the mass protests during 2011 Egyptian revolution.

=== Post-revolution ===
During the uprising, the Egyptian attorney general announced Adly had been given a travel ban. Following Mubarak's resignation, Adly and two other former ministers were arrested on corruption charges. His assets were ordered frozen by a court order. Adly is estimated to have amassed a fortune of 1.2 billion US dollars. He pleaded not guilty to corruption charges on 5 March 2011, answering questions by the judge on whether he had illegally profited from his government position or laundered money by saying "that did not happen." On 5 May 2011, Adly was found guilty of fraud and money laundering and sentenced to 12 years in prison. In June 2012, Adly, along with deposed President Hosni Mubarak, was found guilty of conspiring to kill protestors during the uprising and was sentenced to life in prison in May 2012. In March 2013, the conviction for fraud and money laundering was overturned by the Court of Cassation and a retrial was requested.

On retrial, Adly was acquitted on all charges relating to complicity in the killing of protesters as well as using political influence for private gain. and was released from detention in March, 2015.

In April 2017, he was sentenced to 7 years in prison, based on charges of embezzling about $122 million. In May 2018, the Cairo Court of Appeal began the retrial of former interior minister Adly and a number of other ministers. Together they are charged with siphoning off public funds from the ministry in an amount exceeding LE 2 billion in the period between 2000 and 2011.

In May 2019, Egyptian authorities unfroze his assets, after he had been acquitted on all corruption-related charges.

Political offices
Preceded by Hassan Al Alfi	Minister of Interior; 1997–2011	Succeeded by Mahmoud Wagdy
