= Mahmoud Tawfik =

Egyptian politician (born 1961)

- محمود توفيق
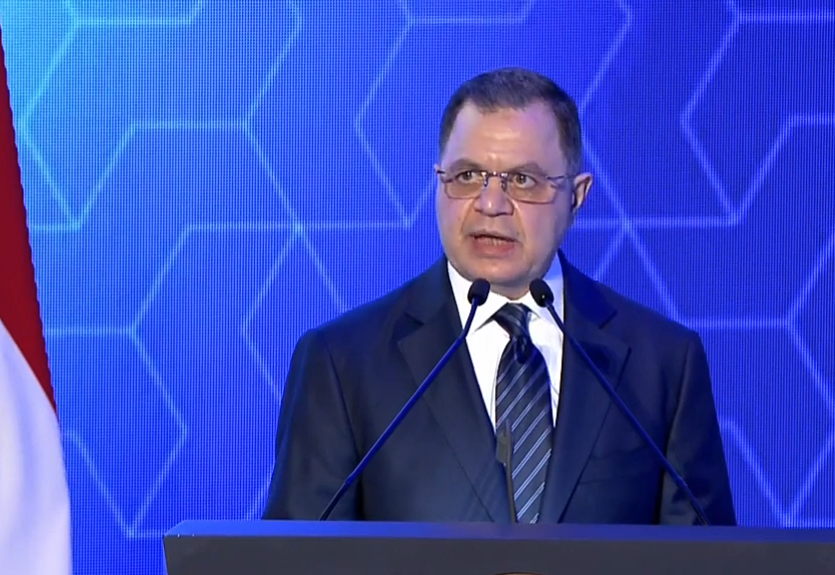
- Tawfik in 2022

Minister of Interior
- Incumbent
- Assumed office 14 June 2018
- President: Abdel Fattah el-Sisi
- Prime Minister: Mostafa Madbouly
- Preceded by: Magdy Abdel Ghaffar

Director of the National Security Agency
- In office 29 October 2017 – 14 June 2018
- President: Abdel Fattah el-Sisi
- Preceded by: magdy abdelghafar
- Succeeded by: Hamid Abdallah

Personal details
- Born: 1961 (age 64–65) Giza, Egypt

Military service
- Allegiance: Egypt
- Branch/service: Egyptian National Police
- Years of service: 1982–present
- Rank: Major General

Mahmoud Tawfik (Arabic: محمود توفيق; born 1961) is an Egyptian politician and police officer. He serves as the Egyptian Minister of Interior.

== Career ==
Tawfik joined the Egyptian police and graduated from the Police Academy in 1982. Following his graduation, Tawfik worked for various Egyptian security agencies under the control of the Egyptian Ministry of Interior. He started working for the Cairo Security Directorate, before joining the State Security Investigations Service and later its successor agency, the National Security Agency in 2011.

At the National Security Agency, he served as director of the agency's external operations department before becoming deputy director in 2015. Tawfiq was involved in counter-terrorism activities, especially against Islamist groups, including the Muslim Brotherhood.

On 29 October 2017, Tawfik was promoted to director of the National Security Agency by then Minister of Interior Magdy Abdel Ghaffar after insurgents killed several police officers in an ambush in the Egyptian Western Desert. During his time as director, Amnesty International reported that the agency was responsible for large scale human rights violations including torturing, abducting and killing members of the opposition without trial.

On June 14, 2018, President Abdel Fattah el-Sisi reshuffled key ministries and appointed Tawfiq as Minister of Interior.
