= Ahmed Gamal El Din =

Egyptian politician

Ahmed Gamal El-Din

Minister of Interior of Egypt
- In office 2 August 2012 – 5 January 2013
- Prime Minister: Hisham Qandil
- Preceded by: Mohamed Youssef Ibrahim
- Succeeded by: Mohamed Ibrahim Moustafa

Personal details
- Born: 11 November 1952 (age 74) Gharbiya Province, Egypt
- Party: Independent
- Education: Police Academy

Military service
- Rank: Major general

Ahmed Gamal El Din (born 11 November 1952) is a retired police general and Egypt's former minister of interior. He served in the Qandil cabinet.

== Early life and education ==
El Din was born on 11 November 1952 in Gharbiya Province, Egypt. Abdel Ahad Gamal El Din, who was one of the major members of the National Democratic Party (NDP) during the Mubarak era, is his uncle. More specifically, elder El Din served as the parliamentary majority leader of the ruling NDP during the 2000s.

El Din graduated from the Police Academy in 1974. He holds a license in law and policing.

== Career ==
El Din is a retired security officer with the rank of major general. He was conscripted in the Army in 1971 in a mechanized infantry regiment and served in the 1973 War as a commander of a rifle platoon. After the war, he completed his education in the Police College and was commissioned as a lieutenant in 1974. He served in the Egyptian security services during the 1980s and 1990s. Then he became the head of security in the provinces of South Sinai and Upper Egypt Assiut. He is also the former director of the public security authority, responsible for gathering information. In 2011, he was named as deputy minister for general security and head of public security by former interior minister Mansour El Esawy and continued to serve at both posts during the tenure of Mohamed Ibrahim, the next interior minister. His task in this post of deputy minister was to keep Egyptian streets safe. Ahmed Aboul Enein from the Daily News Egypt claims that El Din was not successful in this regard. El Esawy also appointed Gamal El Din as the official spokesperson of the interior ministry, leading to criticisms due to the latter's being nephew of Abdel Ahad Gamal El Din.

El Din was appointed interior minister in August 2012, replacing Mohamed Ibrahim in the post. Following his appointment, the first statement of El Din was about a new law that would become a substitute to the emergency law cancelled in order to "stop criminals" and make the streets safer. In November 2012, he reshuffled about 100 leading positions in the ministry throughout the country. The reshuffle included 100 major police generals and nine security directorates, including Gharbia Governorate, Alexandria, North Sinai, Assiut, Aswan and Sohag. In addition to this, El Din established two divisions within the ministry: a human rights section headed by Major General Hussein Othman and a social communication sector headed by Major General Abu Bakr Abdel Karim. On 5 January 2013, El Din was replaced by Mohamed Ibrahim as interior minister in a cabinet reshuffle.

=== Criticism ===
The reshuffle in the interior ministry that was carried out by El Din in November 2012 led to objections. In addition, the Strong Egypt Party released a statement on 21 November 2012, at the beginning of the 2012 Egyptian protests, stating that President Mohamed Morsi should remove El Din and hold him accountable for the 2011 Mohamed Mahmoud clashes during which he had been serving as deputy interior minister.

== Personal life ==
El Din is married and has three sons: Hossam, who is a police officer, Abdullah, who is an engineer, and Marwan, who is a dentist.
