= Mohamed Youssef Ibrahim =

Egyptian politician

Minister of Interior of Egypt
- In office 7 December 2011 – 1 August 2012
- President: Hussein Tantawi (Acting); Mohamed Morsi
- Prime Minister: Kamal Ganzouri
- Preceded by: Mansour el-Essawy
- Succeeded by: Ahmed Gamal El Din

Personal details
- Born: 23 January 1947 (age 79)

Military service
- Allegiance: (Egypt)
- Years of service: 1967-2012
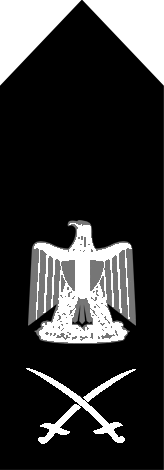
- Rank

Mohamed Youssef Ibrahim (Arabic: محمد يوسف إبراهيم; born 23 January 1947) is a former minister of interior in the Egyptian Government. Retired from the ministry in 2007, Ibrahim was appointed on 7 December 2011 by Kamal Ganzouri, then prime minister of Egypt. Ibrahim was replaced by his aide Ahmed Gamal El Din in an August 2012 cabinet reshuffle by Mohamed Morsi.

== Early life and education ==
Ibrahim was born in Sohag, Egypt, on 23 January 1947. He was conscripted into the Egyptian Army in 1965 at the age of 18 and served in an Infantry Mortar regiment and participated in the 1967 War. He later joined the Egyptian Police College and graduated in 1968 and was commissioned as a lieutenant in the National Police.

== Career ==
After graduating, Ibrahim joined Cairo Police Directorate, then worked in the public security sector as a precinct officer. In the 1970s, he was posted in the State Security. He served as director of the Security Directorates of Sohag and El Minya in the 1990s. In 2001, Ibrahim became assistant minister of interior for Central Upper Egypt. In 2002, he was appointed assistant minister of interior for prisons department. In 2003 he was appointed assistant minister of interior and the director general of Giza police directorate. In 2006, Ibrahim became first assistant minister of interior for the economic security sector and he retired in 2007.

=== Controversy ===
During his tenure in Upper Egypt from 1989 to 1999, there were several terrorist attacks by Islamic fundamentalists. In December 2005, an incident known as the "Mostafa Mahmoud massacre" occurred in Cairo under his command, earning him serious criticism for the violence used against Sudanese refugees.
