= Marwa Arafa =

Egyptian translator and child rights activist

- Born: Egypt
- Occupations: Translator, Child rights activist
- Organization: Free the Children
- Known for: Child rights activism, Advocacy for arrested minors
- Criminal charge: Joining and funding a terrorist organization
- Criminal status: Detained without trial for two years
- Children: 1 daughter

Marwa Arafa is an Egyptian translator and child rights activist advocating for the rights of arrested minors. She was forcefully arrested and disappeared by Egyptian police in April 2020. She was charged with joining a terrorist organization and detained for two years without trial.

== Arrest and enforced disappearance ==
Arafa, a member of Free the Children, an organization advocating for the freedom of detained children combines her child rights activism with offering humanitarian supports to families of arbitrarily detained victims with provisions, medical consumables and study materials. On the evening of April 20, 2020 Egyptian state security agents raided her home, searched and arrested her without a search and arrest warrant. She was forcefully disappeared for 14 days without a trace. On May 10, 2020, security agents presented her with a warrant of arrest at the National Security Prosecution where she was assigned Case No. 570 and interrogated. Her arrest came a day before another activist, translator and researcher Kholoud Said was arrested from her home by midnight.

Arafa was charged with joining and funding a terrorist organization. She was then put in detention for two years exceeding the duration allowed by the law. Her daughter of less than three years at the time of her detention was denied access to her mother.
