= Mohamed Ibrahim Moustafa =

Egyptian politician (born 1953)

Mohamed Youssef Ibrahim
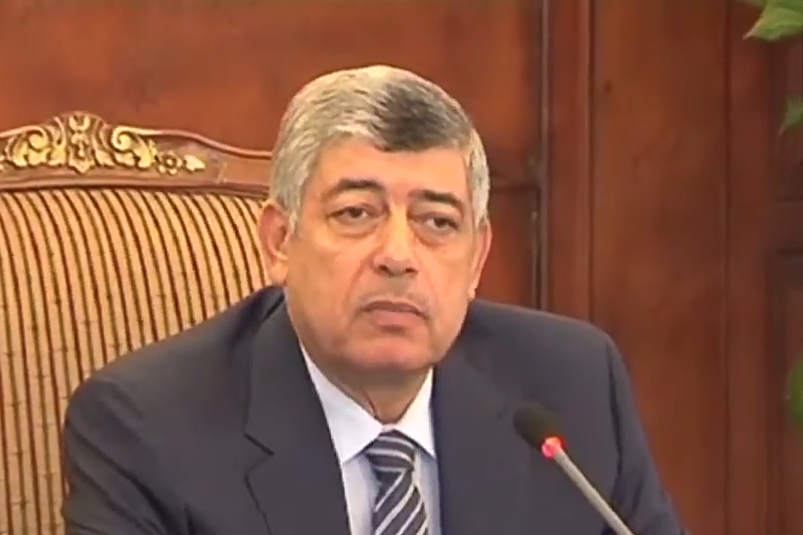
- Born: 10 April 1953 (age 73); Beheira Governorate, Egypt
- Military career
- Allegiance: (Egypt)
- Branch: Interior Ministry
- Service years: 1974-2015
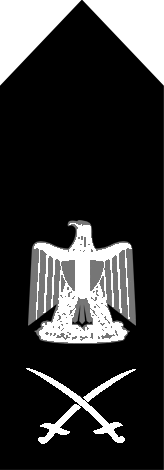
- Rank: Major General
- Unit: Egyptian National Police
- Commands: Mokattam Police District; El Minya City Police; Sharqeyya Police Directorate; Directorate of Prisons

Mohamed Ibrahim Moustafa, often referred to simply as Mohamed Ibrahim (Arabic: محمد إبراهيم مصطفى; born 10 April 1953) was the Minister of Interior of Egypt, from January 2013 until March 2015.

== Career ==
Ibrahim has worked for the interior ministry in several roles. At one point he was an assistant minister for the prisons department.

He succeeded Ahmed Gamal El Din to take a place in the Qandil Cabinet in January 2013. He attracted criticism after police violence against anti-Morsi protests at the main Muslim Brotherhood headquarters in Cairo.

Mohamed Ibrahim was one of the ministers who kept his cabinet place after the July 2013 military coup; he was re-appointed to Hazem El-Beblawi's interim cabinet, formed later in the same month.

On 26 July 2013 Mohamed Ibrahim told al Ahram that Cairo sit-in protests by supporters of deposed president Mohamed Morsi would be "brought to an end soon and in a legal manner." After tens died in violence through the following night, he denied that officers had fired live ammunition rounds at protesters in Nasr City. Activist Mohamed Adel said that the April 6 Youth Movement condemned the killing of protestors, and called for Mohamed Ibrahim's resignation.

=== August 2013 Egyptian raids ===
On 14 August 2013, police under the command of Ibrahim raided two protest camps held by supporters of President Mohamed Morsi resulting in at least 638 killed of which 595 were civilians. The raids were described by Human Rights Watch as the most serious incident of mass unlawful killings in modern Egyptian history.

On 10 December, thirteen Egyptian and international human rights organizations urged Cairo's interim authorities to probe the mass killing of protesters in the capital on August 14. The joint call, issued by organizations that included Amnesty International, Human Rights Watch and Egyptian Initiative for Personal Rights, said an investigation must be launched into the killing of "up to 1,000 people by security forces" almost four months ago when they dispersed sit-ins by supporters of deposed president Mohamed Morsi. "There can be no hope for the rule of law and political stability in Egypt, much less some modicum of justice for victims, without accountability for what may be the single biggest incident of mass killing in Egypt's recent history," said Gasser Abdel-Razak, associate director at the Egyptian Initiative for Personal Rights. "As a first step toward accountability, the government should establish an effective independent fact-finding committee to investigate responsibility throughout the chain of command for the unlawful killings," the rights groups said. They said that on August 14 a "small minority of protesters used firearms... but the police responded excessively by shooting recklessly, going far beyond what is permitted under international law." "After the unprecedented levels of violence and casualties seen since the ousting of Mohamed Morsi, investigations must provide real answers and cannot be another whitewash of the security forces' record," Hassiba Hadj Sahraoui of Amnesty International said in the statement. "Egypt's authorities cannot deal with the carnage through PR in world's capitals, rewriting events and locking up Morsi's supporters." The groups also said the probe should determine whether there is any evidence of a policy to kill protesters or commit other serious crimes.

== Assassination attempt ==
On 5 September 2013, a car bomb detonated in Ibrahim's convoy as it traveled through Nasr City. Ibrahim was unharmed, but more than 21 people were injured, with one of the injured dying on 6 September. The Egyptian Islamic Jihad denied that it was the perpetrator of the attack, stating that it stopped using bombings as a method during the rule of Hosni Mubarak. A jihadist group named Ansar Bait al-Maqdis claimed responsibility.
