= Egyptian National Identity Card =

Identity verification card for Egyptians

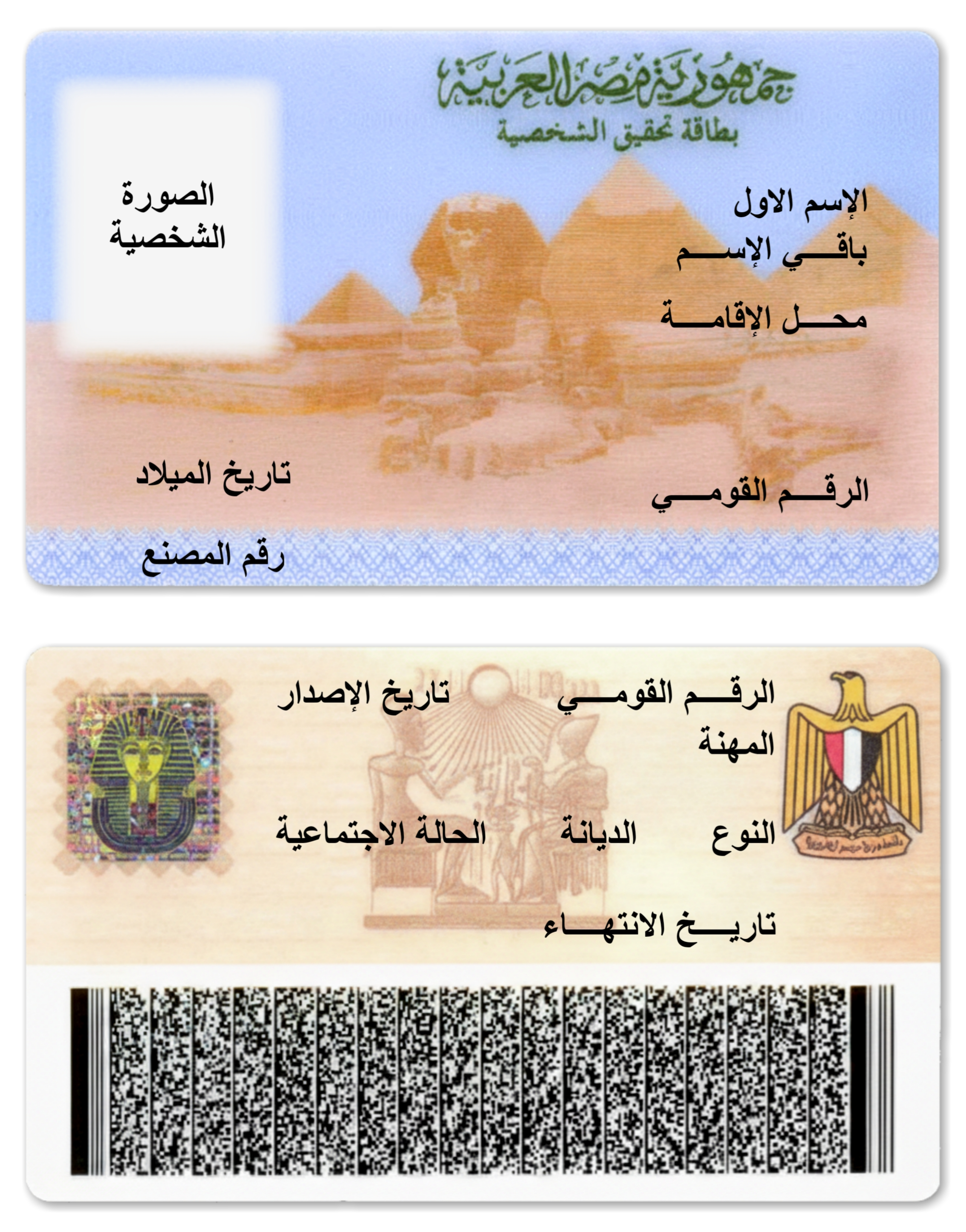
In Egypt, the card number in the photo is the national ID number.

National Identity Card, officially known as the Identity Verification Card in Egypt, is a personal identification document issued by the Civil Registry Authority, which operates under the jurisdiction of the Egyptian Ministry of Interior. The card serves as identifying Egyptian citizens, in compliance with Law No. 143 of 1994 on Civil Status.

This law mandates that all citizens aged 15 and above obtain and carry the identity card and present it to public authorities upon request. Failure to acquire the card, update personal data within three months of any changes, or present the card when requested by public officials may result in a fine.

The validity period of the National Identity Card is determined by a decree from the Minister of the Interior, currently set at seven years from the date of issuance. Once this period expires, the card becomes invalid.

== Card data ==
The card contains the following information:

- Full name
- Date of birth
- Gender
- Religion
- Residence address
- Issuing office
- Profession (As per the relevant registration certificate, depending on applicable laws such as the University Organization Law, the Trade Union Law, the Civil Service Law for the government sector, the Labor Law for the private sector, etc.
- Husband's name (for women)
- National number
- Personal photo
- Card issuance date
- Card expiration date (for cards issued after January 1, 2009)
- Card number (factory number)

=== National Number ===
The national number is a unique 14-digit identifier assigned to each citizen. It encodes specific personal information and remains linked to the individual throughout their lifetime.

- First Digit from the Left: Represents the century of birth.
- Next Six Digits: Represent the date of birth.
- Next Two Digits: Represent the province of birth.
- Next Four Digits: Serve as a serial number.
- Last Digit: An optional check digit used to verify the validity of the national number.

Note: The province of birth number is assigned by the civil registry computer, along with the serial number and confirmation number. The back of the card is printed with an optical code that complies with the PDF417 standard, and the encoded data is encrypted.

== National ID description ==
Each citizen's national number represents the following:

Examples	2	8	2	0	8	1	5	3	0	4	5	9	7	4
Code	C	Y	Y	M	M	D	D	X	X	Z	Z	Z1	C1	
Description	Denotes the century of birth, representing a span of one hundred years From 1900 to 1999 = 2 From 2000 to 2099 = 3	Date of birth						Denotes the specific province of birth		Unique four-digit number: A number assigned by the system that is distinct for births occurring on the same day within the same province				Check digit (verification number)
Description	Denotes the century of birth, representing a span of one hundred years From 1900 to 1999 = 2 From 2000 to 2099 = 3	Year		Month		Day		Denotes the specific province of birth					Indicates the person's gender (odd for male, even for female)	Check digit (verification number)

== Provincial codes ==
Code	01	02	03	04	11	12	13	14	15	16	17	18	19	21
Governorate	Cairo	Alexandria	Port Said	Suez	Damietta	Dakahlia	Sharqia	Qalyubia	Kafr El Sheikh	Gharbia	Monufia	Beheira	Ismailia	Giza
Code	22	23	24	25	26	27	28	29	31	32	33	34	35	88
Governorate	Beni Suef	Fayoum	Minya	Asyut	Sohag	Qena	Aswan	Luxor	Red Sea	New Valley	Matruh	North Sinai	South Sinai	Outside the republic

== See also ==
- Identity document
