= Central Security Forces =

Egyptian internal security force

Central Security Forces قوات الأمن المركزي Quwwāt al-Amn al-Markazī
- Central Security Forces Emblem

Agency overview
- Formed: 1977
- Annual budget: $2.44 billion (2003)+ $1.3 billion of U.S military aid annually 3.4% percentage of GDP (2004)

Jurisdictional structure
- National agency: Egypt
- Operations jurisdiction: Egypt
- General nature: Civilian police
- Specialist jurisdictions: Protection of international or domestic VIPs, protection of significant state assets

Operational structure
- Parent agency: Ministry of Interior

Notables
- Significant operation: 1986 Egyptian conscripts riot; Egyptian Revolution of 2011; Egyptian Crisis; Sinai insurgency; 2012 Heliopolis Palace incident

The General Security and Central Security Forces (Arabic: قوات الأمن العام و الأمن المركزي, romanized: Quwwāt al-Amn al- Amm wa Quwwāt al-Amn al-Markazī, often shortened to Arabic: الأمن المركزي, romanized: Al-Amn al-Markazī) is an Egyptian paramilitary force which is responsible for assisting the Egyptian National Police (ENP) for the security of governmental fixed sites, foreign embassies & missions, riots and crowd control, publicly crowded events, high risk arrests, disaster response and SWAT operations. They are a vital arm of Egypt's National Security apparatus.

== History ==
In 1969, a decision was made to create the Central Security Forces from well trained and equipped police forces on large scale covering the whole country under the command of the Ministry of Interior (Egypt) to conduct special police operations in response to operational needs. The creation of those forces followed the military model, and became close – in formation, training, equipment and operating procedures – to the Italian Carabinieri, Indian CRPF and the Russian OMON. The initial batch of recruits were drawn from the Police and had to undergo military training under the Army. Later on, in 1970, a separate training institute was set up for the CSF and the force started conscripting its recruits, just like regular Army conscripts. Formed in 1977 to obviate the need to call upon the armed forces to deal with domestic disturbances, the CSF grew rapidly to 100,000 members when Mubarak took office. The CSF was set up to deal with the growing unrest and public disorder following the Egyptian defeat in the Six-Day War. The CSF was deployed by the Sadat government to tackle large protests by Leftist and hardline Nasserist groups in January 1972 in Cairo, the protests were called to protest against Sadat's anti-Soviet and anti-Palestinian foreign policy, lack of action against Israel and right-wing economic measures such as cutting some subsidies and increasing some prices of welfare services like public transport. CSF units had to use force to disperse the rioting crowds in Tahrir Square which led to the shooting death of three protestors.

Following the 1973 Arab Israeli War between Egypt and Israel – then settling the 1973 & 1974 Ceasefire agreements; the 1979 Egyptian–Israeli Peace Treaty was signed and the subsequent Israeli withdrawal from the rest of Sinai Peninsula occurred. The Treaty stipulated the Egyptian government refrain from deploying regular Egyptian Armed Forces units in the eastern part of Sinai that directly border Israel (Zone "C"). The Egyptian government then tasked the Central Security Forces to take up the task. The CSF force deployed is effectively a motorized light infantry force without the heavy weapons and equipment.

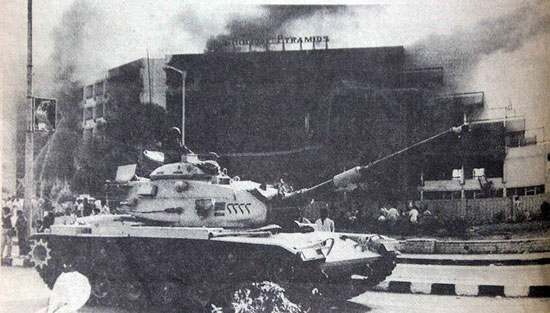
Tanks in Cairo during the 1986 riots

In 1986, hundreds of third category, low ranking, CSF personnel (soldiers) staged a four-day mutiny, in the Egyptian conscripts riot. The riot was a reaction to the spread of false rumours among its conscripts that their (three-year) conscription time will be extended by a year. The insurrection was suppressed by the Egyptian Army. They rampaged through the suburb of Giza burning some hotels and shops in tourist areas. They also burned dozens of cars and buses. Over 20,000 conscripts were dismissed from service with no benefits, and the agitators received correctional punishment after being tried before State Security Court for arson, violent riots, and insubordination according to penal code. Some reports related that mutiny to a conspiracy against the Minister of Interior in charge by then (Gen. Ahmed Roshdy) due to his policies. After the suppression the government promised to overhaul the force by raising its entry standards, increasing payment and bettering living conditions in their camps.

The Egyptian government subsequently came to rely on the CSF to quell any source of instability within the country and to uphold the emergency laws imposed on Egypt since the 1981 assassination of the President of Egypt, Anwar Sadat. The CSF was especially deployed to tackle armed Islamist insurgents. From the 1990s onwards, CSF has become operationally coordinated with the State Security, meaning CSF units can be ordered to deploy by State Security officers, and has been called the "battering ram of State Security".

== Organization ==
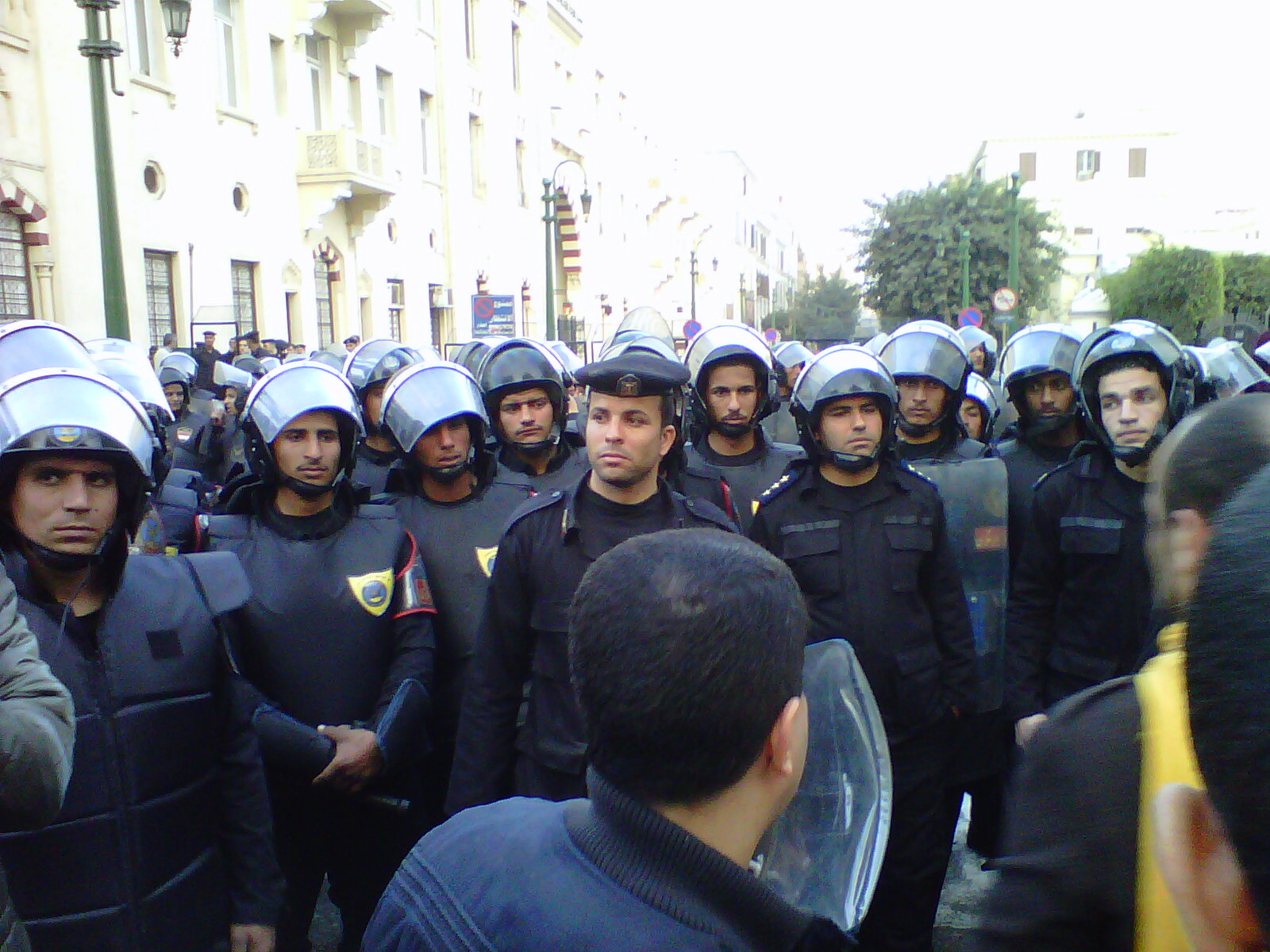
SWAT riot police of the Central Security Forces deployed during the 25 January 2011 protests.

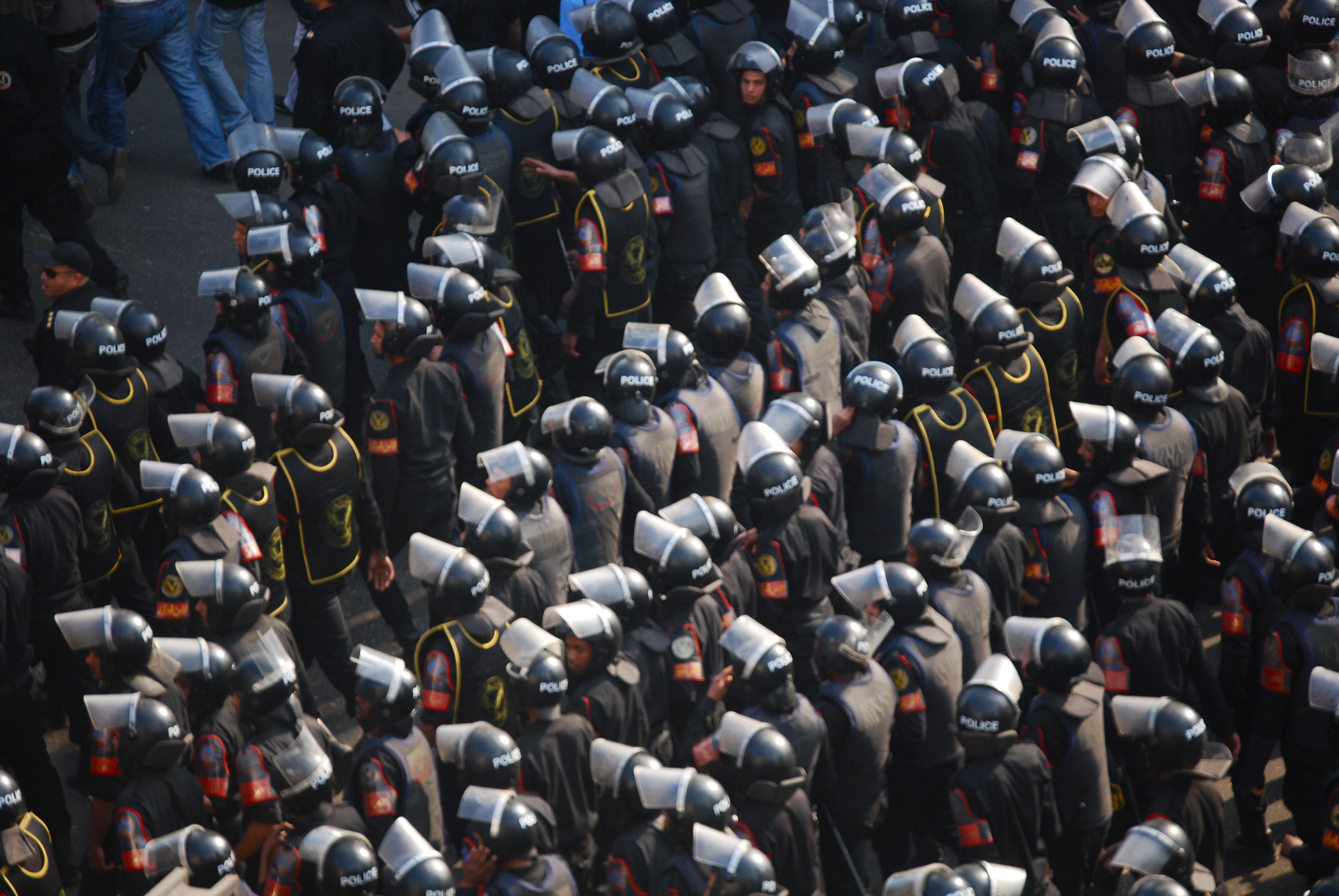
Rows of Egyptian Central Security Forces on the Day of Anger during the 2011 Egyptian revolution.

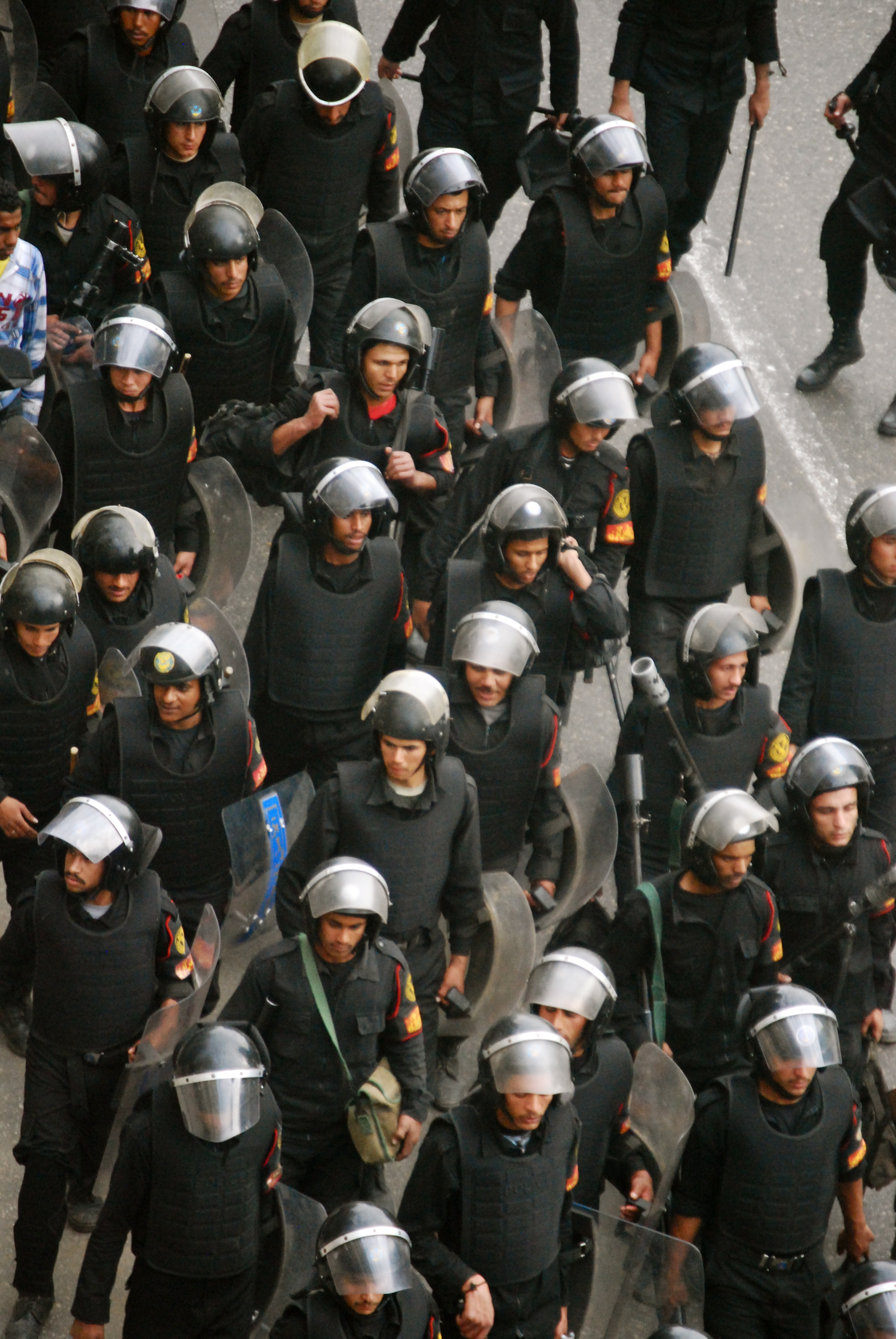
Police in riot gear on 28 January - "The Day of Rage" - during the Egyptian Revolution of 2011.

The CSF is headed by a Director General, who is a 3-star Police General of the Interior Ministry, and is organized as follows:

- Main Headquarters (MHQ).
- Special Operations Command.
  - Black Cobra Unit
- (6) Specialized Training Institutes.
- (8) AOR Operational Regions –
  - Cairo,
  - Alexandria,
  - Giza,
  - Central & Western Nile Delta,
  - Eastern Nile Delta,
  - Suez Canal & Sinai,
  - Southern Upper Egypt, and
  - Northern Upper Egypt

== Deployment and operating procedures ==
Similar to other central SWAT organizations in other countries, CSF deployment is divided into three parts - Baton, Gas, and Armed. The basic unit formation of the CSF is a company which is commanded by a Police Captain (naqib) or in some cases a Major who is a commissioned officer and a graduate of the Police College. A senior Lieutenant (mulazim awwal) (or Captain when the commander is a Major), is usually second-in-command.

A CSF company consists of approximately 150 personnel and is composed of two Baton platoons, a Gas platoon, and an Armed platoon. Each platoon is also commanded by a Captain or a Lieutenant with a Sergeant (raqib) as second-in-command.

Approximately 3 to 4 companies make up a CSF Battalion, which is commanded by an officer of full Colonel rank.

The Baton platoons are equipped with batons and shields, the gas platoon is responsible for the deployment of Teargas, and the armed platoon usually carries Assault Rifles - usually the AK 47 variants, and is organized like a Light Infantry Rifles platoon. However, under emergency laws and martial law, the non-armed CSF units can be converted into armed units, and they are additionally equipped with LMGs, recoilless rifles and sniper rifles for anti-insurgency operations.

Also, the three-part deployment of CSF is not applicable in regions like the North Sinai, where all units are armed at all times.

== Recruitment ==
The Central Security Forces personnel consists of three categories;

- Commissioned Officers (graduated from the Police College of 4 Academic years), who enter the service with the rank of Lieutenant. They are recruited via national-level exams for Police officers, they receive their commission from the President;
- Sub-officers (graduated from Police School of 2 Academic years), they are equivalent to the Non-commissioned officers of the Army; and
- Conscripts (of 6 months training) were recruited from the low educated recruits, as the more educated and college graduates usually end up in the different branches of the regular military service. However, in August of 2011, conscripts started being recruited from secondary schools graduates in order to improve the force. Conscripts can later be promoted to the ranks of sub-officers if they continue in the service beyond their compulsory terms and if they get a higher education and sit for the mandatory exams for entering sub-officer ranks. There is high competition among conscripts to extend their service and to become regularized troops, this is because of the high rate of unemployment in Egypt. A conscript enters the force as a "Private Recruit" and is promoted to "Private First Class" after 2 years of service. At the time of demobilization/release from compulsory 3 years' service, many who have passed their 10th grade in school, are at the rank of Areef or Corporal and can command a section of 10-12 conscripts and 1 riot vehicle. Less educated or illiterate conscripts, however, have to retire at the rank of Private First Class. Those among the Corporals who wish can sit for exams to extend their service and receive the rank of Deputy Sergeant or Junior Sergeant. Most of the conscripts/NCOs are forced to retire at 52 years of age with the rank of Sergeant with no chance of advancement if they do not have a college degree. Less than 2% of conscripts advance into the commissioned officer ranks.

== Ranks ==
Officers -

- Director General (a Lieutenant General ranking officer) (Fariq)
- Major General (Liwa)
- Brigadier General (Amid)
- Colonel (Aqid)
- Lieutenant Colonel (Moqaddem)
- Major (Raed)
- Captain (Naqib)
- First Lieutenant (Mulazim Awal)
- Lieutenant (Mulazim)

Sub-officers-

- Sergeant First Class (Raqib awwal) - this rank is held only by the two or three senior-most NCOs in a Battalion.
- Sergeant (Raqib)
- Deputy Sergeant/Junior Sergeant (Raqib Musaaed) - first NCO rank
- Corporal (Areef) - after 3 years of compulsory service, it is usually held by Section/Troop leaders.

Conscripts -

- Private First Class/Junior Corporal/Squad Leader (Musaed areef)
- Private Recruit/Conscript (Mujannad)

== See also ==
- Law Enforcement in Egypt
- National Security Agency (Egypt)
- Mohamed Mahmoud Graffiti
- List of paramilitary organizations
