= Abdelkarim Darwish =

Egyptian Politician, Businessperson and Philanthropist (1926–2011)

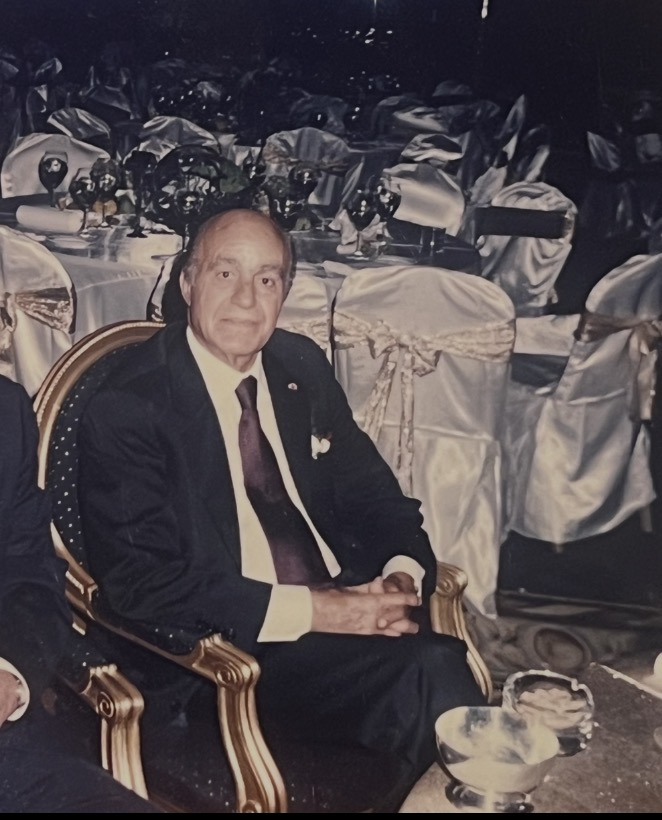

Abdelkarim Darwish (7 April 1926 – 15 December 2011) was a Major General of the police force, an academic scholar and writer, a professor and educator, an institutional leader, a minister, member of the senate and politician, businessperson and philanthropist.

Abdelkarim Darwish established the Egyptian women's police force. In 1984, during his tenure as head of the Police Academy, a dedicated women’s unit was introduced as part of broader efforts to expand and modernise police structures.

He served as President of the Egyptian Olympic Committee from 1985 to 1990, overseeing Egypt’s participation in international competitions during a transitional period. He led the Egyptian delegation at the 1988 Seoul Olympic Games, where Egypt participated in taekwondo at the Olympic level for the first time.

== Publications ==
- The Six-Hour War
- Principles of Public Administration (أصول الإدارة العامة)
- Harvest of the Years (حصاد السنين)
- Major General Dr Abdelkarim Darwish Memoirs: An Unextinguished Candle in the History of Egyptian Police (2023), published by the Al-Ahram Center for Translation and Publishing
