= Mahmoud Wagdy =

Egyptian politician

- محمود وجدي

Minister of Interior of Egypt
- In office 31 January 2011 – 5 March 2011
- President: Hosni Mubarak; Mohamed Tantawi (Acting)
- Preceded by: Habib el-Adly
- Succeeded by: Mansour el-Essawy

Personal details
- Born: 23 March 1948 (age 77); Koum Hamada, Beheira

Mahmoud Wagdy (Arabic: محمود وجدي, born 23 March 1948) is an Egyptian politician and a former minister of interior.

== Early life and education ==
Wagdy was born in 1948. He graduated from the Police Academy 1968.

== Career ==
Wagdy was the head of Cairo criminal investigations department and the head of prisons. He was appointed interior minister by President Hosni Mubarak on 31 January 2011, replacing Habib al-Adly. Wagdy's tenure lasted brief and was replaced by Mansour el-Essawy who was appointed by Prime Minister Essam Sharaf on 5 March 2011.

Political offices
Preceded by Habib Ibrahim El Adly	Minister of Interior; January – March 2011	Succeeded by Mansour el-Essawy
