= Egyptian National Police =

Law enforcement agency

Egyptian National Police الشرطة الوطنية المصرية
- Egyptian Police logo

- Egyptian Police flag
- Common name: الشرطة (El shorta)
- Abbreviation: ENP/EGP
- Motto: Police in the service of the people (Arabic: الشرطة في خدمة الشعب, el shorta fe khdmat el alshab); Police of the people (Arabic: شرطة الشعب, shortat alsha'b) Counter-terrorism and hostage rescue Combat all types of crimes Maintaining public health Achieve the tranquility of the citizen

Agency overview
- Formed: 1805
- Employees: 500,000 - 1,000,000
- Annual budget: $1.9 Billion Dollars

Jurisdictional structure
- National agency: EG
- Operations jurisdiction: EG
- Area: 1,011,000
- Population: 113,903,000
- Governing body: Ministry of Interior
- General nature: Civilian police

Operational structure
- Overseen by: Government of Egypt
- Headquarters: Cairo, Egypt
- Agency executive: Mahmoud Tawfik, Interior Minister

Website
- www.moiegypt.gov.eg

Egyptian National Police or ENP is the national police force of Egypt responsible for law enforcement. It is a department in the Ministry of Interior.

== National organization ==
The Ministry of Interior divides the functions of the police and public security among four Deputy Ministers of Interior while the Minister of Interior himself retained responsibility for National Security (Qitaa' al-amn al-watani), investigations and overall organization.

There are four Deputy Ministers:

- Public Security responsible for public safety (inc. Municipal Police), travel, Immigration, passports, port security, and criminal investigation.
- Special Police responsible for prison administration, the Central Security Forces, civil defense, police transport, police communications, traffic police, Tourism and Antiquities Police and the Presidential police.
- Personnel Affairs was responsible for police-training institutions, personnel matters for police and civilian employees, and the Policemen's Sports Association.
- Administrative and Financial Affairs responsible for general administration, budgets, supplies, and legal matters.

== Regional organization ==
The Egyptian National Police (ENP) is structured into a hierarchical and geographically distributed system that ensures national coverage and efficient command. The police force operates under the authority of the Ministry of Interior and is organized at multiple regional levels to manage law enforcement across the country.

=== Governorate-level Command ===
Egypt is divided into 27 governorates (muhafazat), and each governorate has its own Police Directorate, headed by a Director of Security. This director is responsible for all police operations within the governorate, including crime prevention, investigations, traffic control, and civil defense.

- Each Police Directorate oversees multiple departments, such as:
  - Criminal Investigations
  - Public Security
  - Traffic Police
  - Central Security Forces (in coordination with national command)

=== District and Precinct-level Organization ===
Each governorate is subdivided into districts (markaz), which contain urban precincts and rural police stations. These smaller units report to the governorate's Police Directorate and handle:

- Community policing
- Local crime investigation
- Routine patrols and traffic regulation

=== Specialized Units and Regional Deployment ===
In addition to general law enforcement, specialized units are deployed regionally to respond to specific threats and maintain public order:

- Anti-terrorism units
- Drug enforcement teams
- Tourism and Antiquities Police (especially in regions with major archaeological sites like Luxor and Aswan)
- Environmental and border protection units in regions such as the Sinai Peninsula and the Western Desert

=== Central Security Forces (CSF) ===
Although part of the Ministry of Interior, the Central Security Forces are deployed regionally and support the ENP during:

- Public unrest
- Counter-terror operations
- Major events and demonstrations

== Training ==
All of the commissioned officers were graduates of the Police Academy, established by Abdelkarim Darwish at Cairo, where, after high school, they had to complete four years at the academy, or after College degree, completing a period of 12 to 18 months. The Police Academy is a modern institution equipped with laboratory and physical-training facilities. The police force also sent some officers abroad for schooling.

The Police Academy offers a four-year program which includes: security administration, criminal investigation, military drills, civil defense, fire fighting, forensic medicine, communications, cryptology, first aid, sociology, anatomy, and foreign languages (French and English). Also included are: political orientation, public relations, and military subjects (such as infantry and cavalry training), marksmanship, leadership, and field exercises. Graduates receive a bachelor of police studies degree and are commissioned lieutenants, while those who held degrees from other colleges are commissioned as first lieutenants.

Advanced officer training was given at the academy's Institute for Advanced Police Studies, completion of which was required for advancement beyond the rank of lieutenant colonel. The academy's three-month course for enlisted personnel is conducted in a military atmosphere but emphasizes police methods and techniques.

Some police officers, especially the special operations officers, are well trained by the Egyptian Armed Forces in Al-Sa'ka Military School.

== Uniforms and equipment ==
=== Ranks ===
Egyptian police rank insignia are the same as those used by the Egyptian Army. Commissioned police ranks resemble those of the Egyptian Army. The highest-ranking Egyptian police officer is a major General and officer ranks descend only to first lieutenant. Enlisted police ranks include master sergeant, sergeant, corporal, and private.

==== Officers' ranks ====
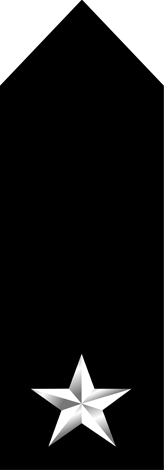
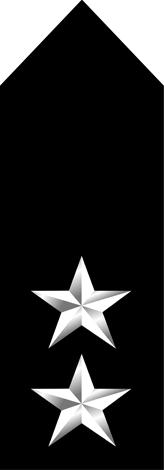
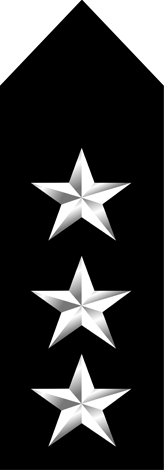
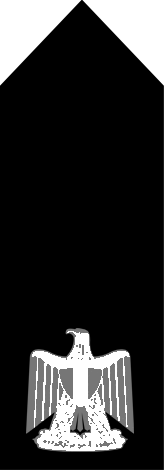
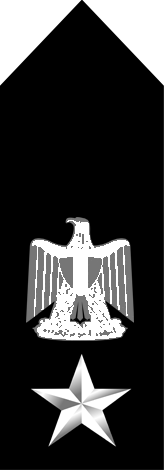
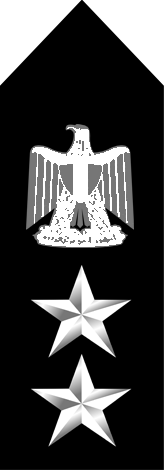
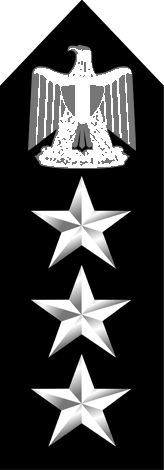
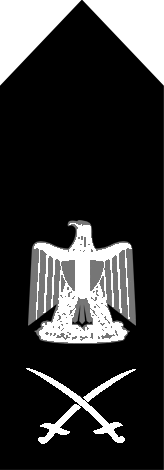
Officers rank insignia of the Egyptian Police
Lieutenant	First Lieutenant	Captain	Major	Lieutenant Colonel	Colonel	Brigadier	Major General
Arabic: ملازم	Arabic: ملازم أول	Arabic: نقيب	Arabic: رائد	Arabic: مقدم	Arabic: عقيد	Arabic: عميد	Arabic: لواء

=== Police uniforms ===
Egyptian police uniforms are similar to the Egyptian Army's service uniform for the ground forces, which is khaki drill cotton. However, enlisted police personnel wear a black wool bush jacket and trousers in the winter and a white cotton bush jacket and trousers in the summer. Certain police personnel also wear a blue or black beret.

=== Equipment ===
Egyptian law enforcement police officers generally carry either the M&P357, CZ 75B or Glock pistol when on regular duty, however, heavy arms are always available at police stations. These include submachine guns, assault rifles, shotguns and carbines, while special units may also have additional weapons like Flash bang and stinger tear gas grenades, H&K USP series and SIG Sauer series pistols, Heckler & Koch MP5, Heckler & Koch UMP and FN P90 submachine guns, M14 rifle, the Remington 700P and some .50 caliber sniper rifles.

The Tourism and Antiquities Police cover tourist destinations like historical sites, museums, hotels, etc. Places such as the Great Pyramid of Giza, Memphis Giza, Egyptian Museum, etc. in Cairo, Alexandria – Qaitbay Citadel and the Serapium Temple and Pompey's Pillar, etc., going through all cities in Egypt carrying same weapons as law enforcement police.

=== Transport ===
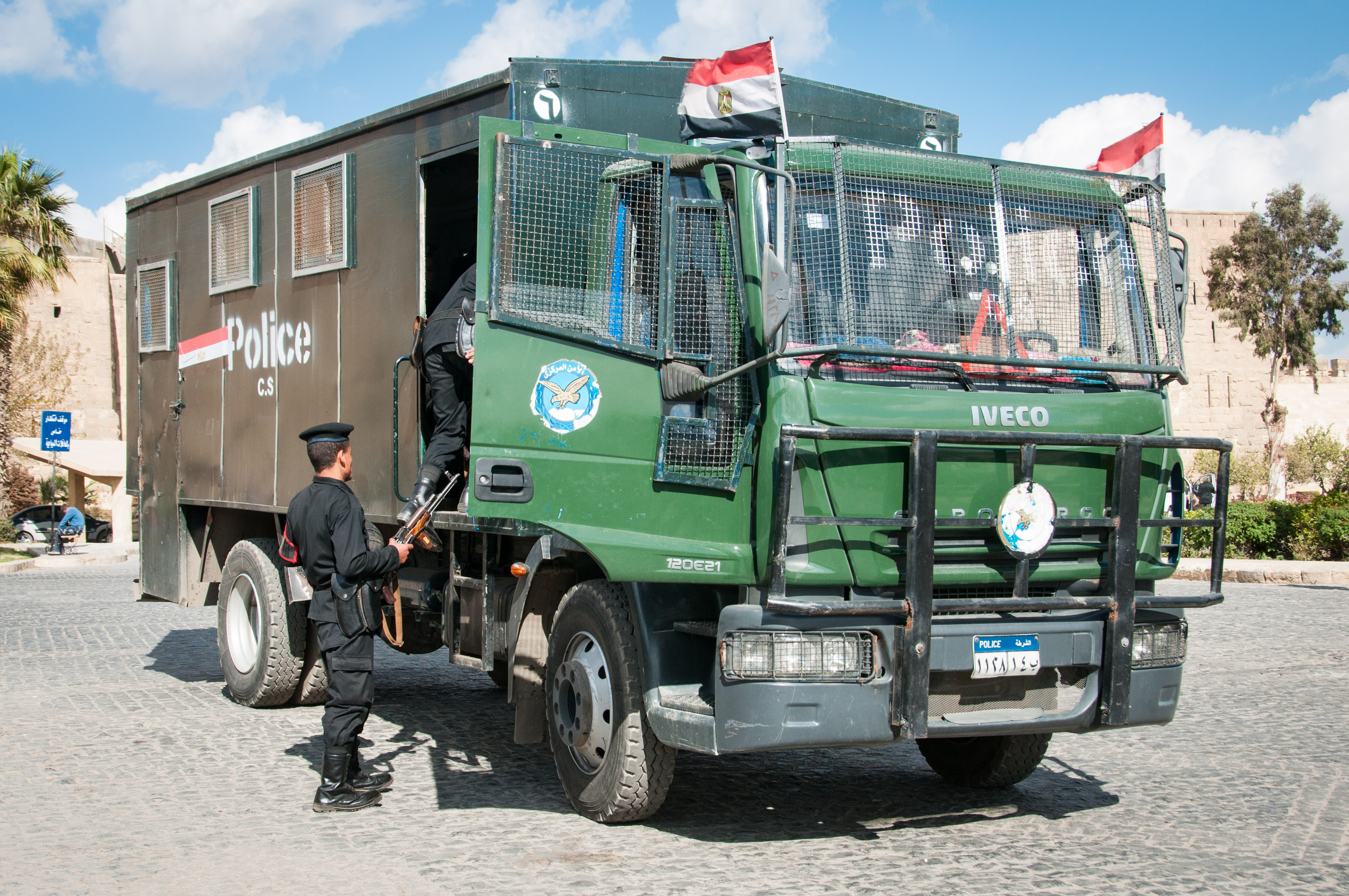
Egyptian National Police Iveco Eurocargo.

Unlike in many other countries, the Egyptian police extensively use SUVs. The Egyptian produced Jeep vehicle used to be the most common police car in Egypt but in recent years, other similar vehicles have also come into police use. SUVs are known for their capabilities to move around in any sort of terrain. Depending upon the location, the police vehicles may have individual revolving lights (strobe lights) or light bars, sirens etc. An extensive modernisation drive has ensured that these vehicles are equipped with wireless sets in communication with a central control room. Traffic Police vehicles generally also have equipment like speed radars, breath analysers and emergency first aid kits. Color schemes of police vehicles vary according to their location and which directorate they belong to.

For traffic regulation and patrolling in cities, motorcycles are also used. This is because of increasing congestion in cities where the heavier bikes would prove to be unwieldy when compared to the nimbler handling the newer bikes were capable of. The bikes are provided with two-way radios, strobes and sirens and are generally painted white. Some cities make use of sedans as patrol vehicles or high speed 'interceptors' on highways. Of late, the various police forces are on a modernisation drive, upgrading and revamping their fleet with new vehicles.

== Relations with public ==
The police in Egypt lost some prestige during the 2011 Revolution. According to one source the Egyptian police, "once feared by civilians, are now seen as leftover elements of Mubarak's regime and treated with little respect. Pulled off the streets after violently cracking down on protests in January, they are now trying to reshape their role in the post-Mubarak Egypt." Police brutality is credited with being one of the causes of the revolution, and as of June 2011 several police officers are being tried for the killing of "hundreds of demonstrators" during the revolution. According to government statistics, 90 police stations have been burnt since the start of the revolution. The government has taken steps to address public concerns and police demoralization. In response to a planned July 8 rally protesting the release on bail of police accused of murdering protesters during the revolution, interim interior minister Mansour el-Essawy promised to purge up to 700 corrupt senior police officers. However protesters complained that five months after the revolution where almost 1000 people were killed, only one officer has been convicted of wrongdoing and he has not yet been incarcerated.

=== July 2013 coup d'état ===
Mass demonstrations took place for and against President Mohamed Morsi on 30 June 2013, marking the one-year anniversary of Mohamed Morsi's inauguration. The police, along with the military, had made it clear that they were with anti-government protestors by carrying out a coup d'état on 3 July.

=== Sit-in dispersals ===
The August 2013 Rabaa massacre by police to remove pro-government protesters from sit-ins being held in Rabaa Al-Adawiya and Al-Nahda Square in support of President Mohamed Morsi resulted in rapidly escalating violence that eventually led to the death of over 900 people, with at least 3,994 injured. The police attempted to defend their actions by claiming to disperse the sit-ins with the least possible damage.

=== Treatment of women ===
According to writer Ahdaf Soueif, since 2005 the police have routinely grabbed women protesters and torn "their clothes off and beat them, groping them at the same time. The idea was to insinuate that females who took part in street protests wanted to be groped." To protect against this, many female protesters wear "layers of light clothing, no buttons, drawstring pants double-knotted".

== Gallery ==
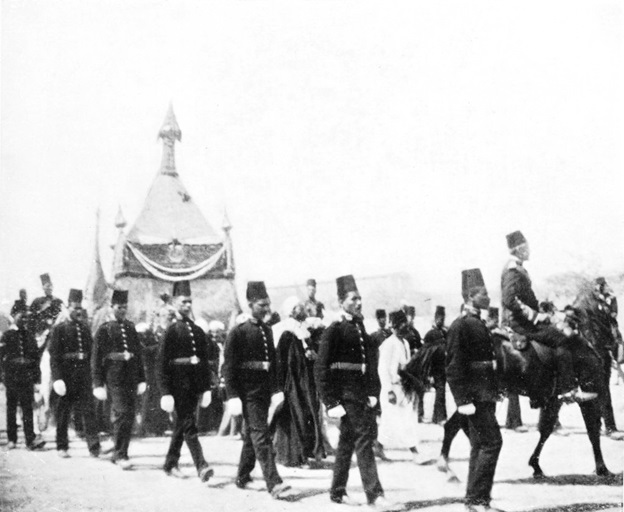
File:The_Mahmal_which_Conveyed_the_Holy_Carpet_to_Mecca_Surrounded_by_Cairo_Police._(1911)_-_TIMEA.jpgCairo police in 1911

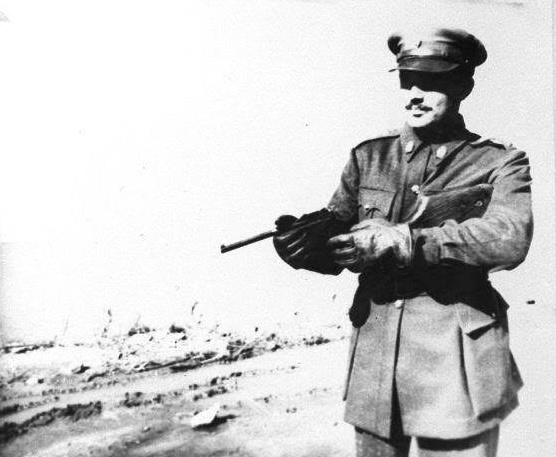
File:Salah_Zulfikar_in_1952.jpgSalah Zulfikar in Battle of Ismailia (1952)

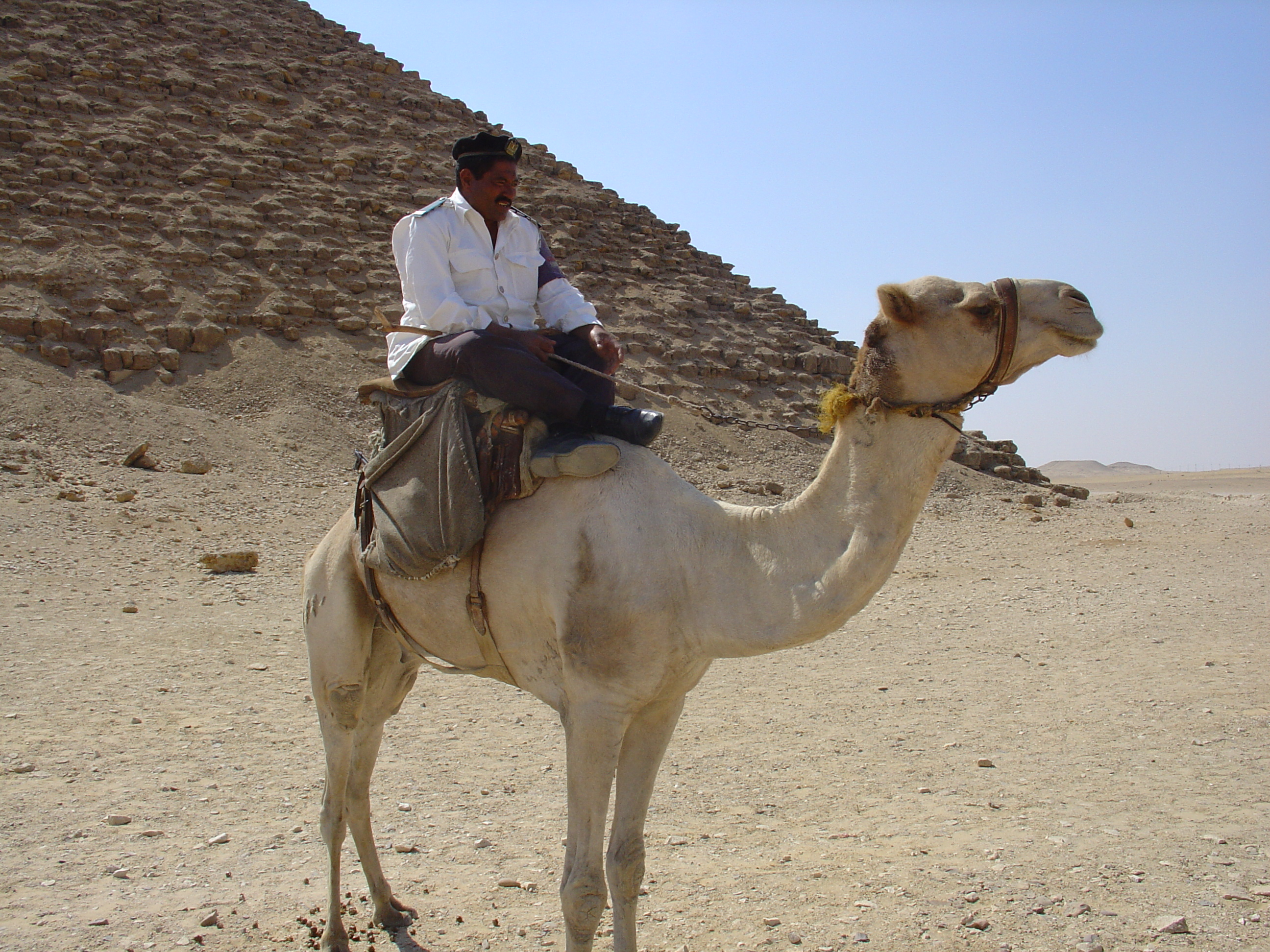
File:Police_on_a_camel_in_front_of_the_Red_Pyramid_in_Dahshur.jpgPolice on a camel in front of the Red Pyramid in Dahshur.jpg

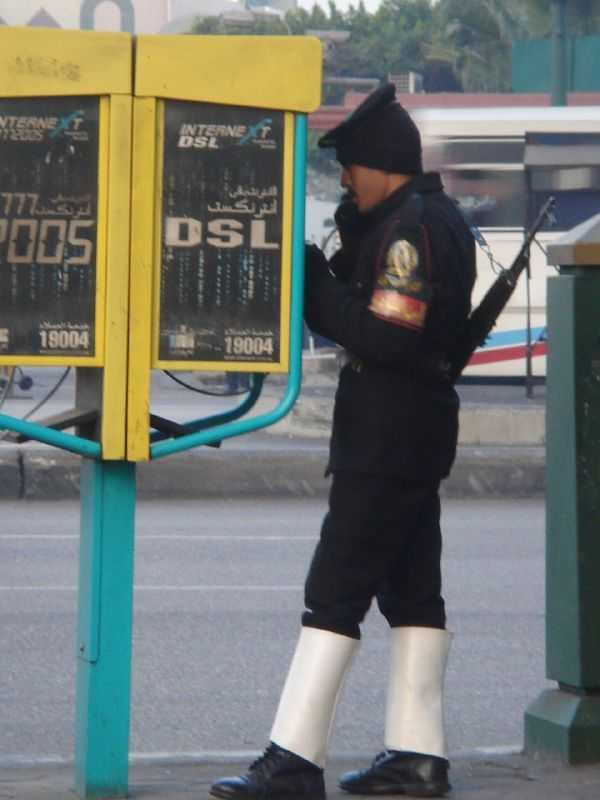
File:Flickr_-_dlisbona_-_Policeman_on_the_phone.jpg

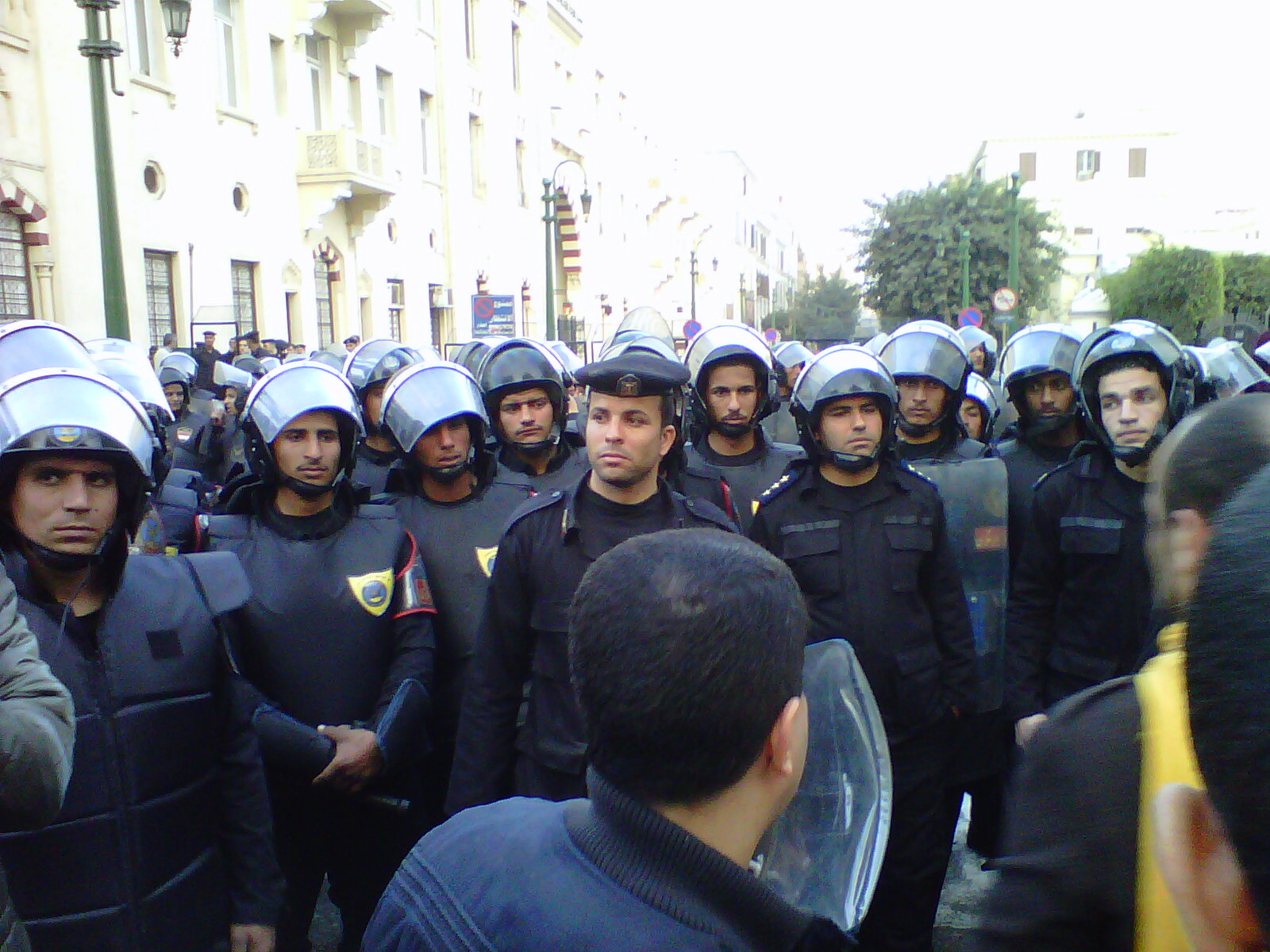
File:Day_of_Anger_riot_police_close.jpgCentral Security Force riot police

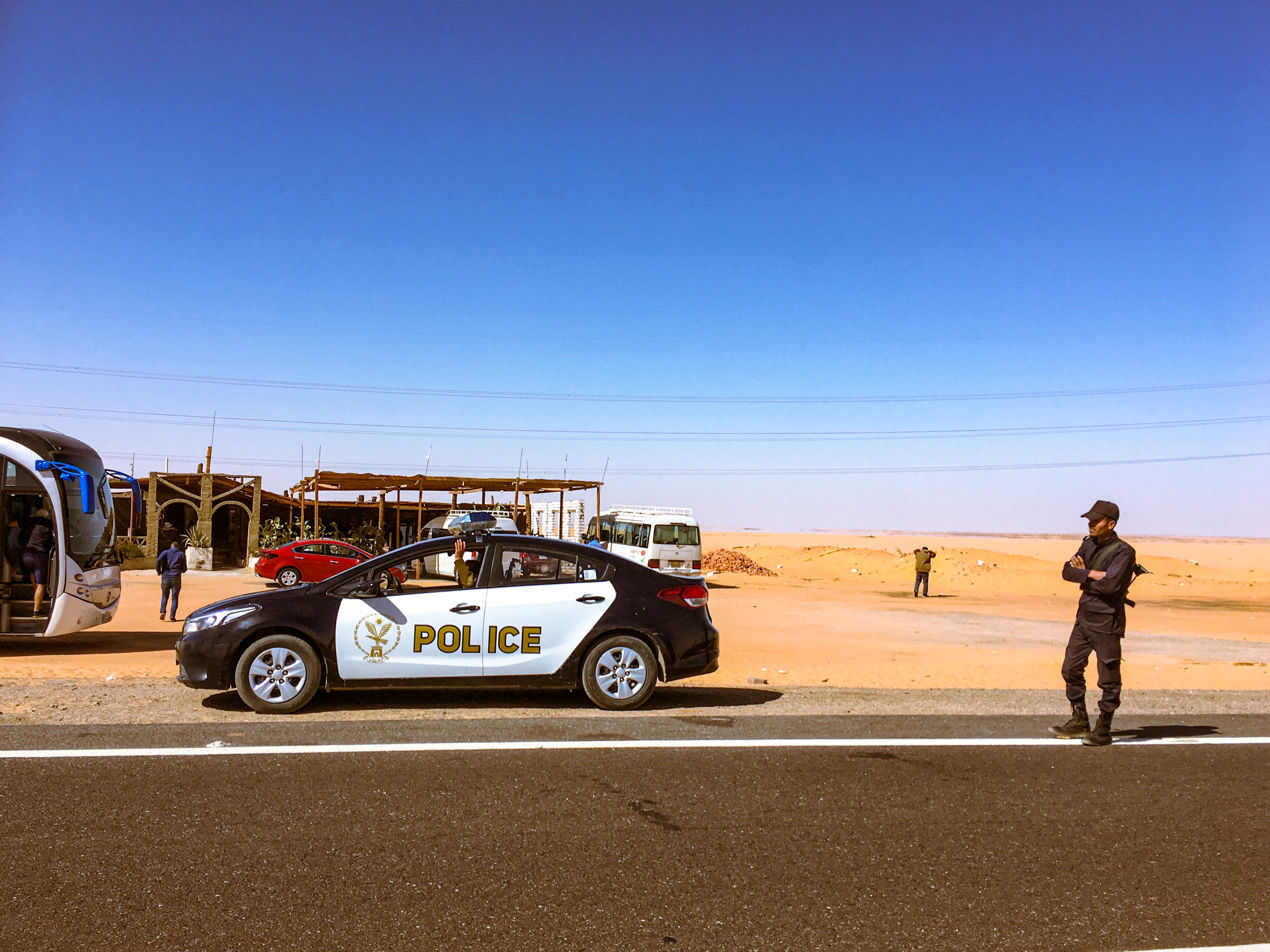
File:Egyptian_police_vehicle_in_Aswan.jpg

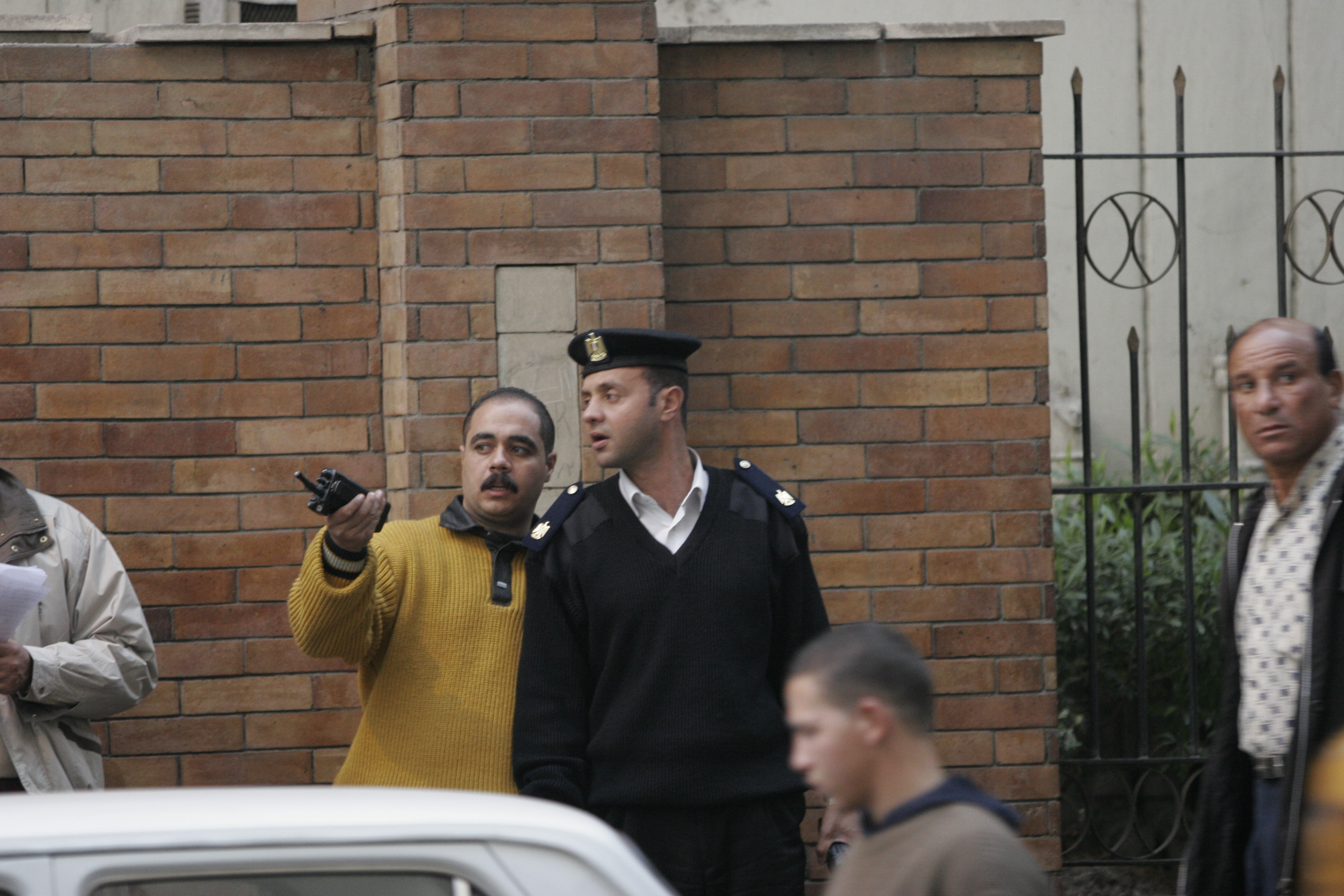
File:Police_Major_Samaw'al_Mohamed_Abu_Sehla.jpg

== See also ==
- Central Security Forces
- Crime in Egypt
- National Security Agency
- General Intelligence Service
- Battle of Ismailia (1952)
- National Police Day (Egypt)
- Terrorism in Egypt
- State Security Investigations Service
- Hostage Rescue Force

== Sources ==
1. World Police Encyclopedia, ed. by Dilip K. Das and Michael Palmiotto published by Taylor & Francis, 2004.
2. World Encyclopedia of Police Forces and Correctional Systems, second edition, 2006 by Gale.
3. Sullivan, Larry E. Encyclopedia of Law Enforcement. Thousand Oaks: Sage Publications, 2005.
4. LOC Egypt County Study page
