= State Security Investigations Service =

Former security agency in Egypt

State Security Investigations Service (SSIS)
- جهاز مباحث أمن الدولة
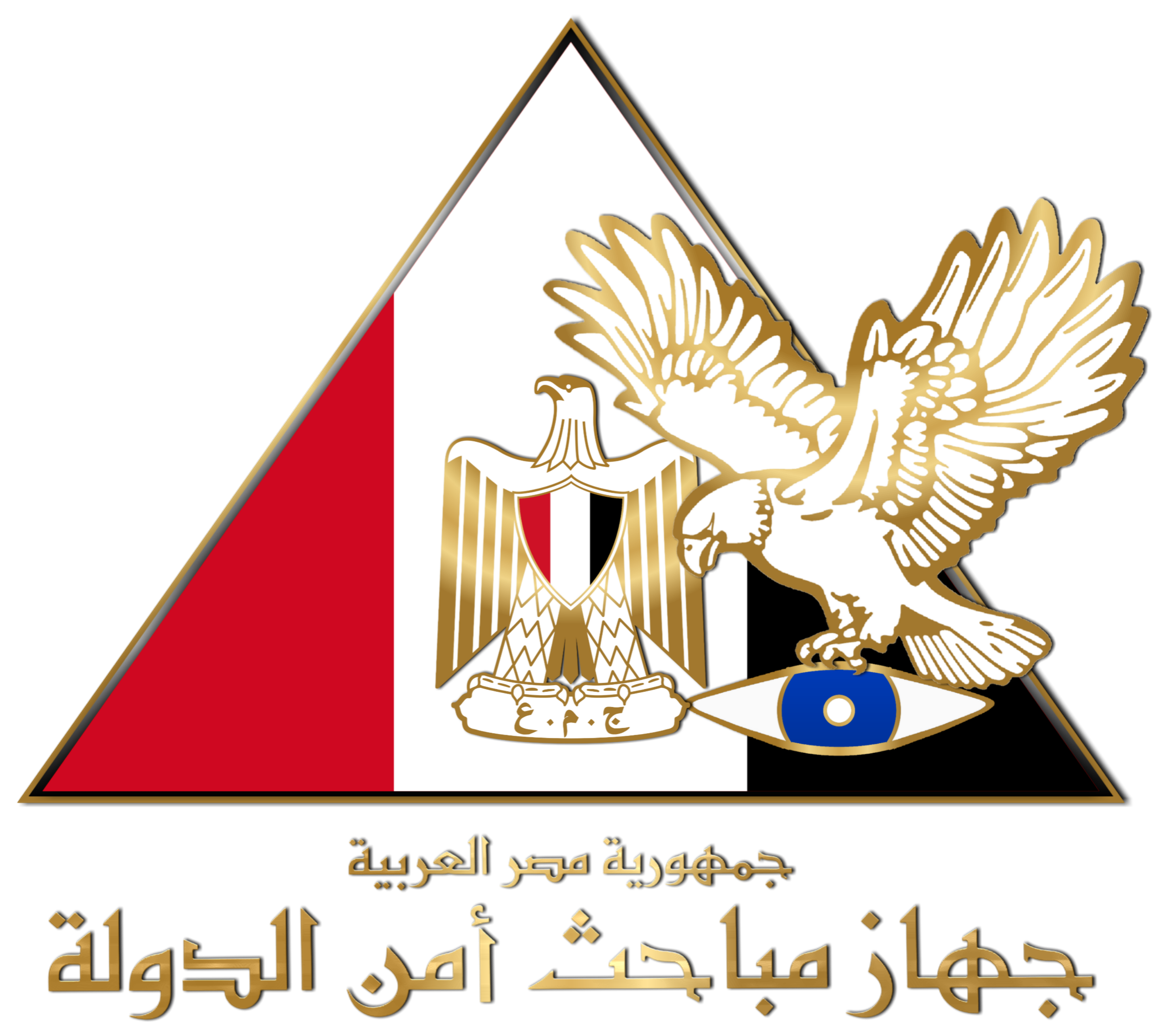

Agency overview
- Formed: 1913
- Dissolved: 2011
- Superseding agency: National Security Sector
- Jurisdiction: Government of Egypt
- Headquarters: Nasr City, Cairo, Egypt
- Agency executive: Hisham Abdel Fattah Mahmoud Ghida, director
- Parent agency: Ministry of Interior

The State Security Investigations Service (Arabic: مباحث أمن الدولة, romanized: Mabahith Amn El Dawla) was the highest national internal security authority in Egypt. Estimated to employ 100,000 personnel, the SSI was the main security and intelligence apparatus of Egypt's Ministry of Interior. The SSIS was responsible for internal security matters such as counter-intelligence and counter-terrorism. In addition, it was focused on monitoring underground networks of radical Islamists and probably planted agents in those organizations and had the role of controlling opposition groups, both armed groups and those engaged in peaceful opposition to the government. It has been described as "detested" and "widely hated".

Following the 2011 Egyptian revolution, the head of the SSI was arrested under suspicion of ordering the killings of demonstrators. On March 15, 2011, the Ministry of the Interior announced the dissolution of the agency. The service was replaced by (or renamed) the National Security Sector after the 2013 Egyptian coup d'état.

== History ==
=== Origins and early history ===
The State Security Investigations Service was originally formed during the colonial era in 1913 as the Intelligence wing of the National Police. The first person to control it was Selim Zaki, who was the head of the Cairo division of the police. In 1936 during King Farouk’s reign, it expanded its size and established 2 administrations, one in Cairo and the other in Alexandria and by that period, It was headed by the leader of the Royal Police whom had received orders from the Monarch directly.

The service was reformed and reorganized following the 1952 coup d'état to suit the security concerns of the new socialist regime. In August 1952, The State Security apparatus was made a separate branch of the Interior Ministry, separate from the regular Police command, and was focused intensively on political threats to the State's security. The State Security was made independent of the Police Command and given legal powers of arrest, detention, and prosecution. Separate State Security Courts were set up to prosecute detainees arrested by the SSIS, separately from the regular prosecution judiciary. The first Chief of the SSIS was the Police Brigadier Ayman Mahfoud, an ex-Army officer who had become a Police officer and a part of the Free Officers' Movement of Gamal Abdel Nasser.

After 1954–55, when relations between Egypt and the Soviet Union drastically improved, the SSIS was intensively trained by the Soviet State Security apparatus on political suppression, infiltration, public surveillance, public intimidation, and coercive interrogation. These newly learned techniques were often used against suspects of the Lavon Affair. State Security officers were sent to the Soviet Union to undergo training under the KGB. During the Nasser era, the State Security apparatus often harassed Egypt's Jewish community. Jewish properties were infiltrated by State Security agents during mid-night and thousands of Jews in Egypt were arrested and tortured by the agency. Jewish neighborhoods across Egypt were also under mass surveillance from the State Security. The State Security was at times successful in catching Egyptian and Israeli Jews whom were spies for Israel and the agency managed to interrogate them using methods of torture to gather important information that helped decrease cases of spying. After 1963, Egyptian State Security officers were sent to Algeria, Syria, Yemen and Iraq to train the newly formed state security agencies of the Baathist and nationalist regimes of those countries. In the 1960s, the SSIS forged new ties with the State Security apparatus of East Germany, which took SSIS competence against political subversion to an extremely competent level. Recruits were carefully screened and selected on the basis of political reliability, and practicing Muslims were virtually barred during the Nasser era. Officers were mostly recruited from the military and the regular Police, who had proven their political reliability. Candidates had to be recommended by loyal Police officers and serving State Security officers. During the Sadat and Mubarak eras, the agency continued its focus on radical Islamists but eased up on the suppression of the Liberal opposition. The SSIS excelled in planting moles and infiltrators within Islamist groups, a practice that would later be carried out with ruthless efficiency by the agency's trainees in Algeria and Syria. Torture was rampantly used during interrogation. Detainees were regularly beaten to death, and sexual penetration was used as a form of torture against Islamist detainees. The agency came to be regarded as professionally competent and capable by Western counter-terror agencies.

=== Torture ===
In a report in 2002, the United Nations Committee against Torture expressed "particular concern at the widespread evidence of torture and ill-treatment in administrative premises under the control of the State Security Investigation Department, the infliction of which is reported to be facilitated by the lack of any mandatory inspection by an independent body of such premises." Human Rights Watch reported that "Egyptian authorities have a longstanding and well-documented record of engaging in arbitrary arrests, incommunicado detention, and torture and other ill-treatment of detainees," and that the SSI has in particular committed acts of torture and denied detainees fundamental human rights. A US diplomatic cable reported that police brutality and torture are "routine and pervasive". The cable also reported that the security services functioned as "instruments of power that serve and protect the regime". Human Rights Watch reported that Egypt's emergency laws allowed the interior Ministry and the SSIS to detain and interrogate civilians without arrest warrants and holding the detainees up to six months without a hearing or arraignment.

Both Egyptian and international human rights groups, as well as the United Nations Committee Against Torture, have documented widespread use of torture by the SSI, with Human Rights Watch singling out the SSI in what it called a "pervasive culture of impunity" with regard to torture. It's been alleged that during the War on Terror, the United States used to send terrorists to the State Security in Egypt for interrogation that included methods of torture. It's also been alleged that several Egyptian State Security agents have travelled to Cuba during the Mubarak era to torture detainees at the Guantanamo Bay and trained U.S. soldiers on torturing techniques against detainees.

=== Involvement in extraordinary rendition ===
Italian authorities investigating the illegal abduction of Egyptian-born cleric Hassan Mustafa Osama Nasr, also known as Abu Omar, from the streets of Milan on February 17, 2003 have said that his final disposition, after a flight from Aviano to Ramstein and then from Ramstein to Alexandria, was into the hands of the SSI. At least one of the CIA officials named in the indictment, Robert Seldon Lady, is said to have accompanied Omar to Egypt, and to have spent two weeks in Cairo assisting in Omar's interrogation.

=== 2011 revolution and after ===
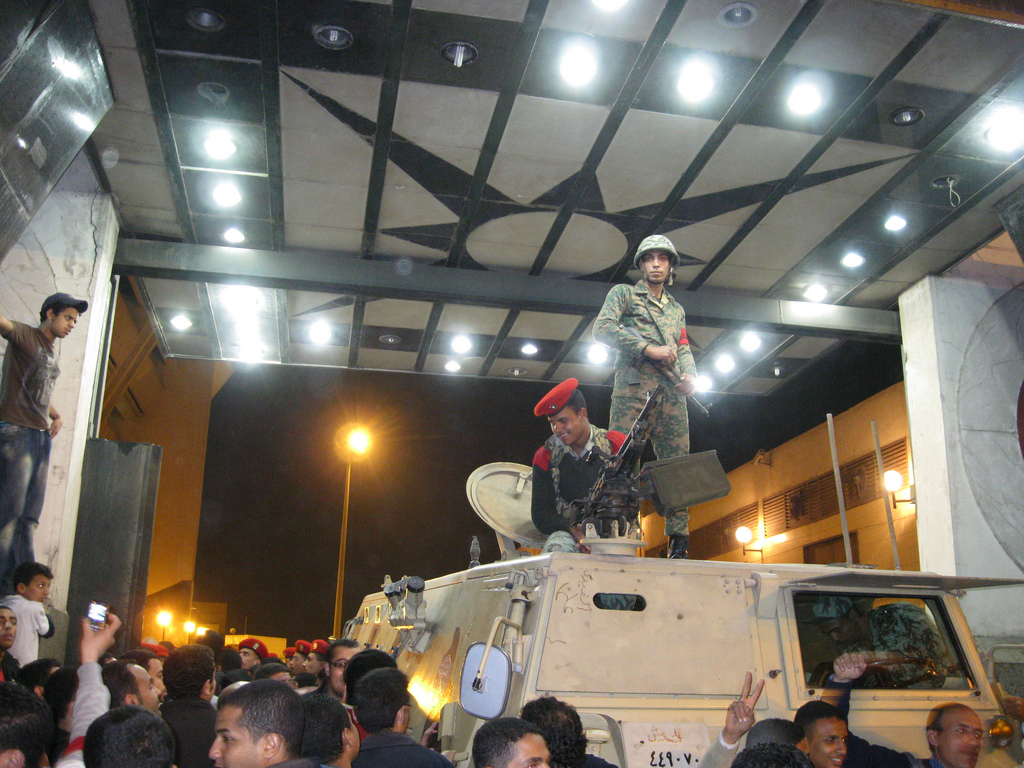
Storming State Security building, 2011

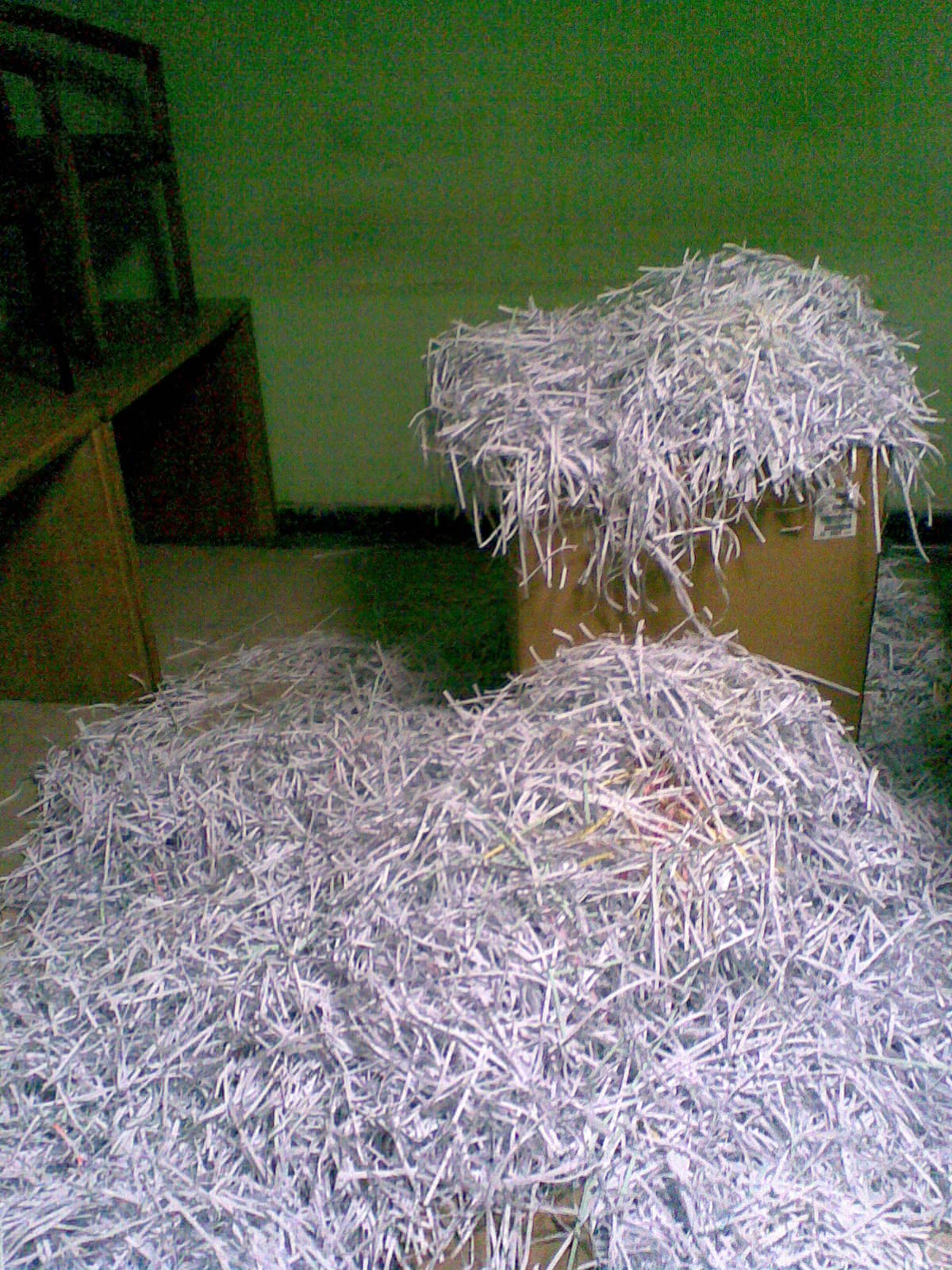
Shredded documents found inside State Security Investigations Service

One of the major demands of protesters during the Egyptian revolution was the abolition of the State Security Investigations.

Following the 25th of January 2011 Revolution, on the 4th & 5 March 2011, several SSI buildings were raided across Egypt by protesters. Protesters state they raided in the buildings to secure documents they believed to show various crimes committed by the SSI against the people of Egypt during Mubarak's rule. On the night of 5 March in Cairo, "the sight of a dump truck emerging from the Cairo compound laden with shredded paper sent protesters into a fury, creating the momentum that drove the crowd past the army soldiers outside and into the hastily abandoned main building."

Most notably at the Nasr City HQ in Cairo were many acquired documents which seemed to prove mass surveillance of citizens as well as torturing tools and secret cells. Protesters broke into the building in Alexandria on March 4, after clashing with security forces, and on March 5 others entered the headquarters in the central city of Assiut. In Cairo, another building breached was in 6th of October City, where "some of the most incriminating documents have already been destroyed." McClatchy Newspapers reported that, when there was much uncertainty about the validity of documents which emerged, "[p]erhaps the most controversial document to ricochet around Internet message boards was one that purport[ed] to lay out State Security's involvement in [the] deadly church bombing on New Year's Day in the port city of Alexandria. ... The legitimacy of the document hasn't been determined, but its distribution touched off protests Sunday in Cairo by hundreds of Coptic Christians."

Other documents uncovered included names of judges involved in fixing elections and those of a small number of Egyptians who were informants. The publishing of these names posed a moral dilemma for some of the protesters, balancing the danger the informants would be put under against anger at having been spied on.

On 15 March 2011, SSIS was dissolved by Interior Minister Mansour el-Essawy in response to the revelations of the previous weeks. He also announced plans for the establishment of a new "National Security Sector" to take over SSIS's counter-terrorism and other domestic-security responsibilities.

Officials from the service complained that during Mohamed Morsi's year in office, the Muslim Brotherhood had access to its files and created security breaches. Due to its efforts of bringing back the security during the Islamist unrest, the agency has gained much of the previous agency's lost respect in Egypt according to Sarah El Deeb of the Associated Press.

== Organization ==
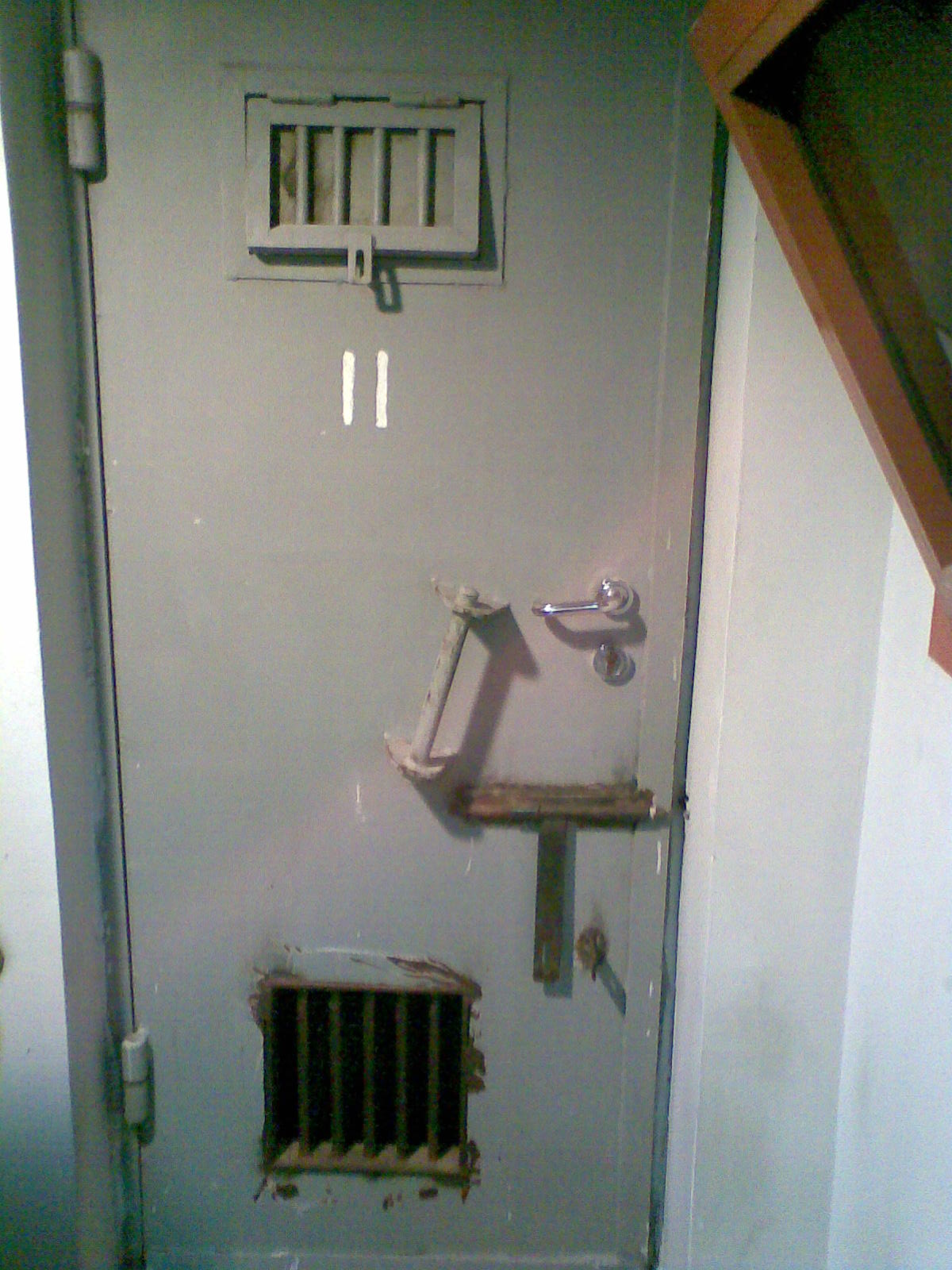
An underground cell in State Security Investigations Service

The SSI was a branch of the Interior Ministry in Egypt with an official aim of protecting the security of Egypt. The SSI had many official bureaus that provide its public face: an "Investigative Bureau" in the Lazoghli section of Cairo, a "Supreme State Security Court" in Giza, a "Supreme State Security Prosecution" (Niyabat Amn al-Dawl a al-'Ulya), etc. A diplomatic cable sent in 2007 published by The Daily Telegraph as part of the leak of classified US diplomatic cables discussed what the then SSI head called the "excellent and strong" cooperation between the SSI and the United States FBI. The cable also discussed the benefit the SSI derived from training opportunities at the FBI's Quantico, Virginia headquarters.

== Notable personnel ==
Major General Ra'uf Khayrat, an assistant director of SSI. 9 April 1994 he was killed in front of his home by a Sunni terrorist group. A former leader of al-Qaeda Ayman al-Zawahiri mentioned this killing: "Ra'uf Khayrat was one of the most dangerous officers in the State Security Intelligence Department who fought the fundamentalists. He adopted several strict security precautions, such as changing his residence every few months, keeping his home unguarded, and driving his car personally to look like he was an ordinary person with no connection to the authority. However, the Islamic Group colleagues managed to reach him. As he was emerging from his home and about to get into his car, one of the brother mujahidin approached him and threw a bomb inside his car, and he was killed instantly". A trial about the case of the Returnees from Albania in 1999 became the largest one since the assassination of Anwar Sadat.

On November 23, 1985, EgyptAir Flight 648 was hijacked by three Abu Nidal terrorists. When the hijackers started collecting passports, agent Methad Mustafa Kamal opened fire, killing one hijacker instantly and engaging in a gun battle with the second hijacker. Kamal was wounded by the third and lead hijacker, Omar Rezaq, who came out of the cockpit, Kamal was later taken off the plane, he survived the encounter.

== See also ==
- Saad Eddin Ibrahim, academic subject to SSI investigation
