= Mansour el-Essawy =

Egyptian politician (1937–2023)

- منصور العيسوى
- Born: 18 September 1937; Qena Governorate, Egypt
- Died: 16 January 2023 (aged 85)
- Military career
- Allegiance: (Egypt)
- Branch: Interior Ministry
- Service years: 1959–1996
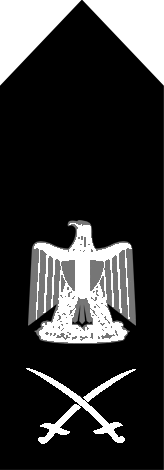
- Rank: Major General
- Unit: Egyptian National Police

Mansour el-Essawi (Arabic: منصور العيسوى; IPA: [mɑnˈsˤuːɾ elˈʕesæwi]; 18 September 1937 – 16 January 2023) was an Egyptian politician who served as minister of interior. He was appointed by Prime Minister Essam Sharaf on 5 March 2011.

== Early life and education ==
El-Essawi was born in the Qena Governorate on 18 September 1937. After serving his two-year compulsory military service in an Army Engineering unit between 1955 and 1957, he was accepted into the Police Officer Training Academy. He received a law degree and a diploma in police science from the Egyptian Police College in 1959. He joined the National Police in 1959 as a commissioned officer. In 1973, he was promoted to the rank of colonel and was awarded a diploma by the Arabic Studies and Research Institute of the Arab League.

== Career ==
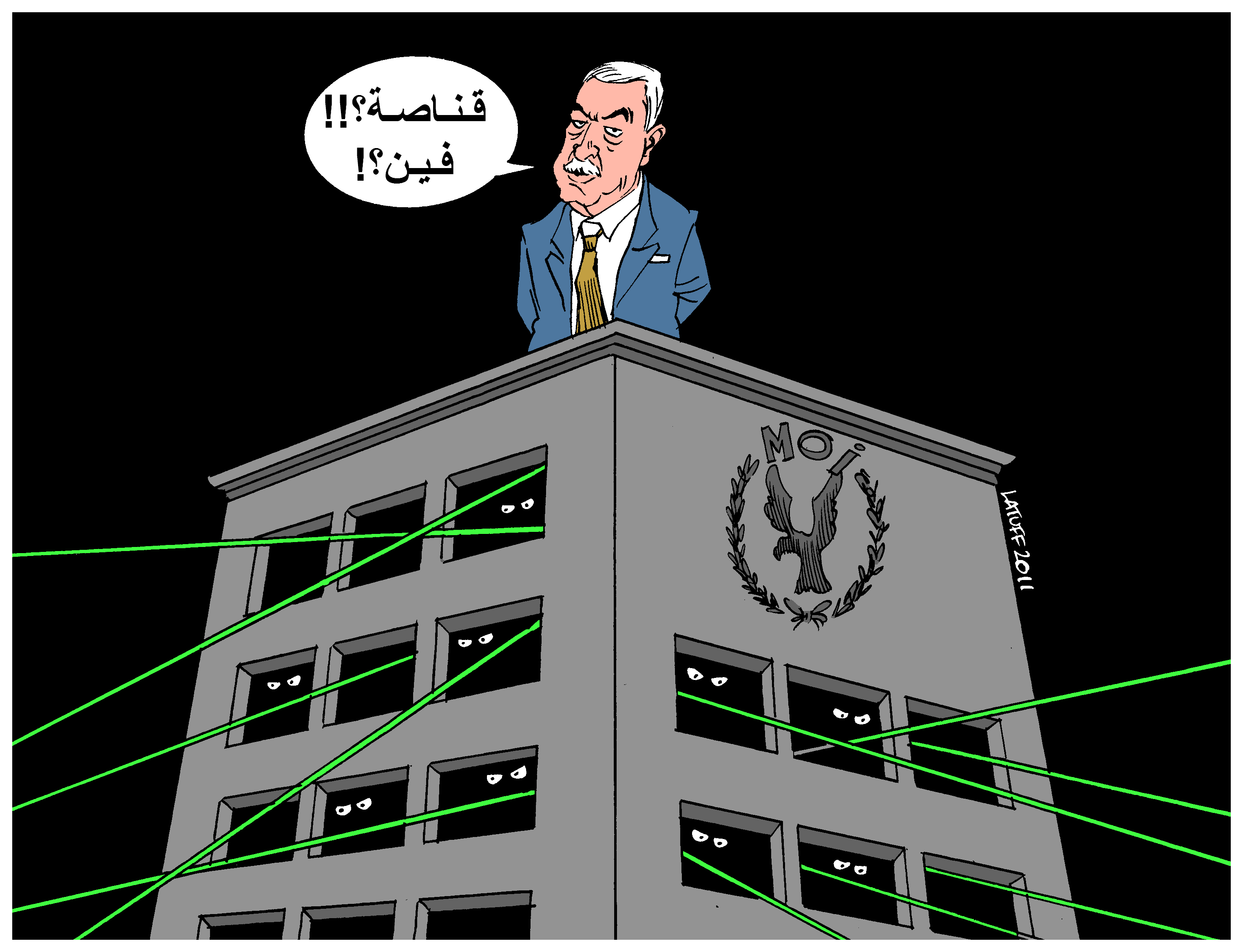
Cartoon by Carlos Latuff about the Egyptian Revolution of 2011

On 1 July 1983, Essawy was appointed to Brigadier and posted as a Police Inspector-General at the general administration of inspection and censorship, and then became the undersecretary of the same administration on 2 February 1986. After being promoted to major general rank in 1987, he was appointed Director General of Police of Giza on 25 October 1988. On 2 August 1991, he was appointed assistant minister of interior for Northern Upper Egypt Zone. On 2 August 1992, he was appointed assistant minister of interior for Central Upper Egypt Zone.

On 29 October 1995, he was appointed assistant minister of interior, Director General of police of Cairo, and was put in charge of the tasks of the first assistant minister of interior for Central Zone. He finally retired from uniformed service on superannuation in early January 1996, and on 16 January 1996, he was appointed governor of Minya Governorate.

The state news agency MENA quoted Essawy as saying his priorities included reinforcing security across Egypt. Egyptian media reports said Essawy was previously the first deputy minister of security of Cairo and Giza governorates and an ex-governor of Minya Governorate. He was reported to be popular for his efforts to curb corruption. He was appointed interior minister to the interim government led by Essam Sharaf on 5 March 2011, replacing Mahmoud Wagdi. Essawy's tenure lasted until November 2011 when he resigned from office.

=== Awards ===
In 1988, Essawy was awarded the Order of Excellence first class.

Political offices
Preceded by Mahmoud Wagdy	Minister of Interior; 2011 – 2011	Succeeded by Mohamed Youssef Ibrahim
