= Ministry of Interior (Egypt) =

Government ministry of Egypt

Arab Republic of Egypt Ministry of Interior
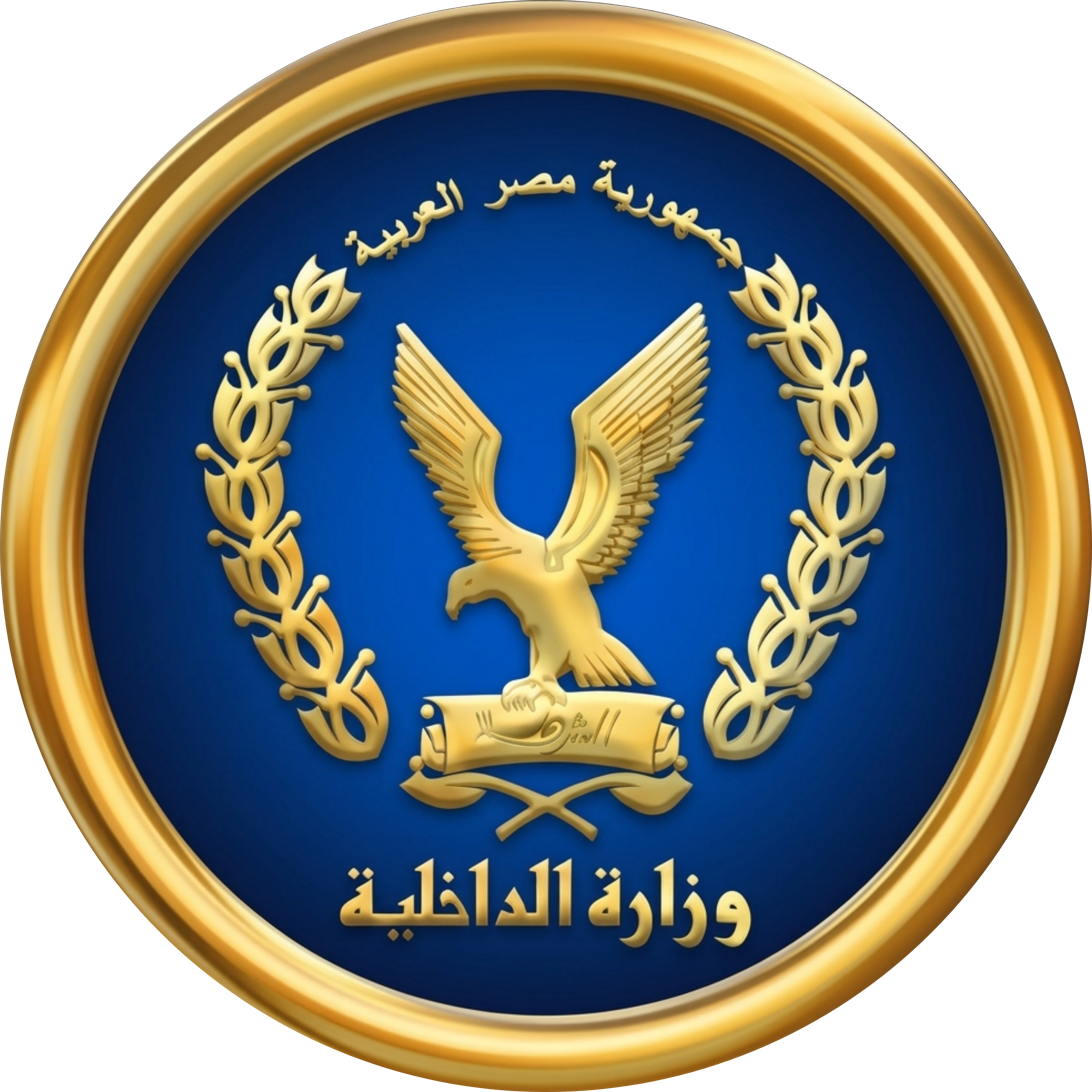
- Emblem of the Egyptian Ministry of Interior

Agency overview
- Formed: 1857
- Jurisdiction: Government of Egypt
- Headquarters: New Cairo, Cairo Governorate, Egypt
- Employees: ~ 2 million
- Agency executive: Mahmoud Tawfik, Minister
- Child agencies: Egyptian Homeland security; Central Security Forces; Egyptian National Police; Egyptian Border Guard Corps

The Ministry of Interior of Egypt is a part of the Cabinet of Egypt. It is responsible for law enforcement in Egypt.

The Ministry of Interior directs the Central Security Forces, around 410,000 in 2012; the National Police, around 500,000; and the National Security Sector, around 200,000 strong.

The Egyptian Border Guard Corps were organised in border guard regiments totaling approximately 25,000 members. They are a lightly armed paramilitary force, mostly Bedouins, responsible for border surveillance, general peacekeeping, drug interdiction, and prevention of smuggling. During the late 1980s, the force was equipped with remote sensors and night-vision binoculars. High-speed motorboats are also in service. The Border Guards were originally under the control of the Ministry of Defense, however control was almost immediately given to the Ministry of Interior after their creation.

== Headquarters ==
On 27 April 2016, President Abdel Fattah Al-Sisi inaugurated the new headquarters of the ministry in New Cairo. The complex covers about 52,000 square metres (560,000 sq ft).

== Ministers ==
- Muhammad Tawfiq Nasim Pasha, November 1919 – May 1920
- Isma'il Sidqi, 1922, and again from 1924 – 1925
- Ahmed Lutfi el-Sayed
- Fouad Serageddin, 1950–1952
- Zakaria Mohieddin, 1953–1962 (from 1958 to 1961 Central Minister of Interior for U.A.R.)
- Zakaria Mohieddin, 1965–1966
- Sharawi Gomaa, 1966–1971
- Mamdouh Salem, 1971–1977
- Nabawi İsmail, 1977 – January 1982
- Hassan Abu Basha, January 1982–July 1984
- Ahmed Rushdi, 1984–February 1986
- Zaki Badr, February 1986 – 1990
- Abdul Halim Moussa, 1990 – 1993
- Hassan Al Alfi, 1993 – 1997
- Habib el-Adly, 1997 – January 2011
- Mahmoud Wagdy, January 2011 – March 2011
- Mansour el-Essawy, March 2011 – November 2011
- Mohamed Youssef Ibrahim, December 2011 - August 2012
- Ahmed Gamal El Din, August 2012 – January 2013
- Mohamed Ibrahim Moustafa, January 2013 – March 2015
- Magdy Abdel Ghaffar, March 2015 – June 2018
- Mahmoud Tawfik, June 2018 – Present

== See also ==
- Cabinet of Egypt
- Egyptian police casualties since 2011
- Egyptian National Identity Card
