= National Security Sector =

Egyptian security service

National Security Sector (NSS)
- قطاع الأمن الوطني
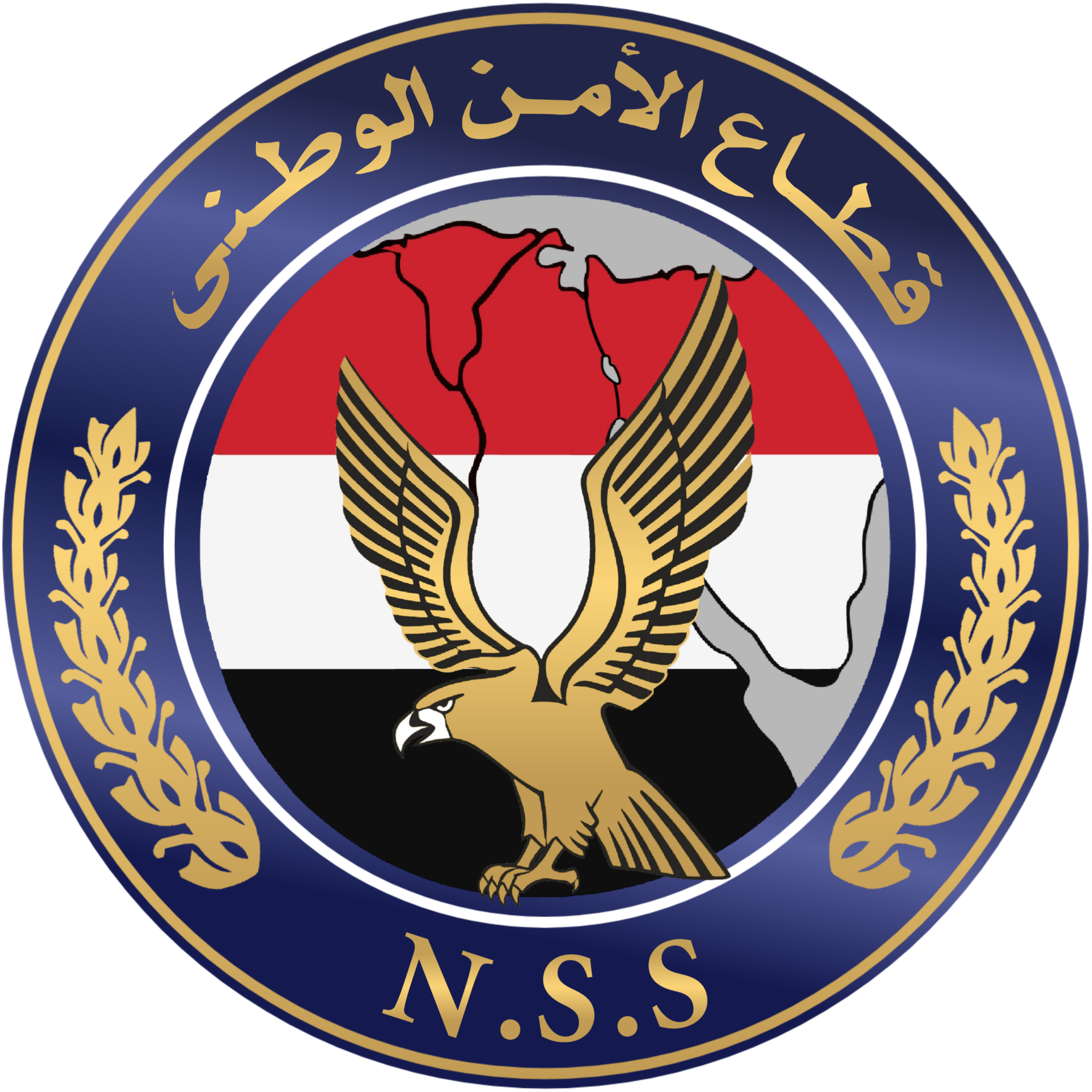

Agency overview
- Formed: 2011
- Preceding agency: State Security Investigations Service
- Jurisdiction: Government of Egypt
- Headquarters: Cairo, Egypt
- Employees: 200,000
- Agency executive: Maj. Gen. Adel Jaafar, director
- Parent agency: Ministry of Interior

The National Security Sector (NSS, Arabic: قطاع الأمن الوطني, romanized: Ketaʿ El Amn El Watani), also Homeland Security, is an Egyptian security service, the main domestic security agency of Egypt. Two other security agencies are the Military Intelligence Authority and the General Intelligence Service which traditionally specializes in foreign intelligence gathering. Its main responsibilities are counter-intelligence, internal and border security, counter-terrorism, and surveillance.

The agency is the successor of the State Security Investigations Service (Egyptian Arabic: مباحث أمن الدولة Mabaḥith Amn El Dawla). The NSS is under the jurisdiction of the Ministry of Interior and is headquartered in Cairo. It "remains the most visible" of Egypt's security agencies and according to one estimate has about "100,000 personnel and at least as many informants".

== Overview ==
The old Security Service has been described as "detested" and "widely hated", and following 2011 Egyptian revolution its headquarters was stormed by protesters who made off with records. The National Security Agency was "established" (according to at least one source it is simply the old State Security Investigations Service with a new name) after the 2013 coup d'état that ousted Morsi and installed General Abdel Fattah el-Sisi. Nearly a hundred of the sacked senior officers of State Security Investigations Service were rehired.

Due to the wave of pro-military nationalism in Egypt and the agency's efforts to improve security during the Islamist unrest, the agency has gained much of the old Security Service's lost respect in Egypt according to Sarah El Deeb of the Associated Press. After announcing the Muslim Brotherhood as a terrorist group due to the December 2013 Mansoura bombing, the agency assigned hotlines for the public to report suspected Muslim Brotherhood members, and was reportedly "reclaiming a major role" and rebuilding its network of informants that had been weakened during the Arab Spring

On the other hand, Declan Walsh of the New York Times states that after the agency was established, torture chambers were reopened.

Opposition leaders, fearing arrest, fled the country. Human rights monitors started to count the numbers of the ‘‘disappeared’’ — critics who vanished into state custody without arrest or trial — until the monitors, too, began to disappear.

El Deeb quotes a campaigner for reform of the security agencies, former police officer Mohammed Mahfouz, who complains that "no specific law regulates the agency's workings, making it largely unaccountable"; and another activist, Wael Abbas, who calls the NSS "a corrupt agency" that "has only changed names" and "is now more vicious than before."

== See also ==
- Military Intelligence and Reconnaissance
- General Intelligence Service
