= First Mahlab Cabinet =

Egyptian governing cabinet

Ibrahim Mahlab Cabinet
- Cabinet of Egypt

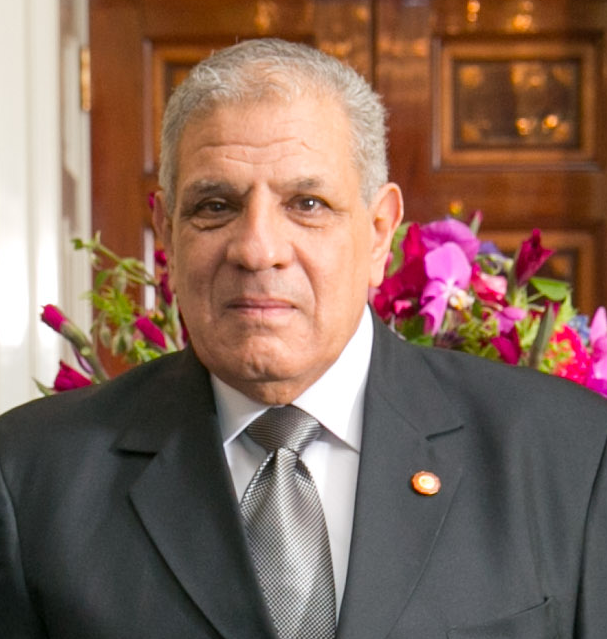
- Date formed: 1 March 2014
- Date dissolved: 8 June 2014

People and organisations
- Head of state: Adly Mansour
- Head of government: Ibrahim Mahlab
- Member party: Independent; Supported by: Egypt Party; Wafd Party

History
- Predecessor: Beblawi Cabinet
- Successor: Second Mahlab Cabinet

The cabinet of Egyptian Prime Minister Ibrahim Mahlab was sworn in on 1 March 2014. The cabinet was made up of 31 ministers. It was the first government to include three Christians as successive governments had only one or two Christians.

== Cabinet members ==
Office	Name	Party
Prime Minister	Ibrahim Mahlab	Independent
Minister of Defence	Sedki Sobhy	Military
Minister of Planning and International Cooperation	Ashraf El-Araby	Independent
Minister of Higher Education and Scientific Research	Wael El-Degwi	Independent
Minister of Interior	Mohamed Ibrahim Moustafa	Police
Minister of Foreign Affairs	Nabil Fahmy	Independent
Minister of Military Production	Ibrahim Younis	Independent
Minister of Finance	Hani Qadri Demian	Independent
Minister of Antiquities	Mohamed Ibrahim Ali al-Sayed	Independent
Minister of Environment	Laila Rashed Iskandar	Independent
Minister of Local Development	Adel Labib	Independent
Minister of Culture	Mohamed Arab	Independent
Minister of Transitional Justice	Amin Al-Mahdy	Independent
Minister of Justice	Nayer Adel-Moneim Othman	Independent
Minister of Education	Mahmoud Abo El-Nasr	Independent
Minister of Transportation	Ibrahim El-Demairy	Independent
Minister of Electricity and Energy	Mohamed Shaker	Independent
Minister of Tourism	Hisham Zazou	Independent
Minister of Agriculture and Land Reclamation	Ayman Abu Hadid	Independent
Minister of Communications and Information Technology	Atef Helmy	Independent
Minister of Information	Durriyah Sharaf Al Din	Independent
Minister of Petroleum	Sherif Ismail	Independent
Minister of Water Resources and Irrigation	Mohamed Abdel Muttalib	Independent
Minister of Housing, Utilities and Urban Development	Mostafa Madbouly	Independent
Ministry of Supply	Khaled Hanafy	Independent
Minister of Manpower	Nahed Ashri	Independent
Minister of Religious Endowment (Awqaf)	Mukhtar Gomaa	Independent
Minister of Health	Adel El-Adawi	Independent
Minister of Civil Aviation	Mohammed Hassan Kamal	Independent
Ministry of Social Solidarity	Ghada Wali	Independent
Minister of Industry, Trade and Investment	Mounir Fakhry Abdel Nour	Wafd Party
Minister of Sports and Youth	Khaled Abdel Aziz	Egypt Party
