= Second Mahlab Cabinet =

Active from June 2014-March 2015

Ibrahim Mahlab Cabinet
- Cabinet of Egypt

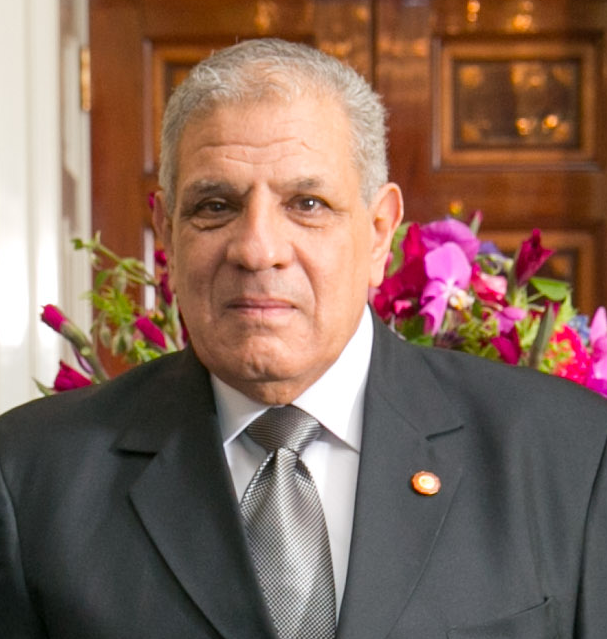
- Date formed: 17 June 2014
- Date dissolved: 5 March 2015

People and organisations
- Head of state: Abdel Fattah el-Sisi
- Head of government: Ibrahim Mahlab
- Member party: Independent; Supported by: Egypt Party; Wafd Party

History
- Predecessor: First Mahlab Cabinet
- Successor: Third Mahlab Cabinet

The cabinet of Egyptian Prime Minister Ibrahim Mahlab was sworn in on 17 June 2014. The cabinet is made up of 34 ministers.

== Cabinet members ==
Office	Name	Party
Prime Minister	Ibrahim Mahlab	Independent
Minister of Defence	Sedki Sobhy	Military
Minister of International Cooperation	Naglaa el-Ahwany	Independent
Minister of Higher Education	Sayed Abdel Khaleq	Independent
Minister of Scientific Research	Sherif Hamad	Independent
Minister of Interior	Mohamed Ibrahim Moustafa	Police
Minister of Foreign Affairs	Sameh Shoukry	Independent
Minister of Finance	Hani Qadri Demian	Independent
Minister of Environment	Khaled Fahmy	Independent
Minister of Urban Development	Laila Iskander	Independent
Minister of Culture	Gaber Asfour	Independent
Minister of Transitional Justice	Ibrahim El-Heneidy	Independent
Minister of Justice	Mahfouz Saber	Independent
Minister of Education	Mahmoud Abo El-Nasr	Independent
Minister of Transportation	Hany Dahy	Independent
Minister of Electricity and Energy	Mohamed Shaker	Independent
Minister of Tourism	Hisham Zazou	Independent
Ministry of Agriculture and Land Reclamation	Adel el-Beltagy	Independent
Minister of Communications and Information Technology	Atef Helmy	Independent
Minister of Petroleum	Sherif Ismail	Independent
Minister of Water Resources and Irrigation	Hossam Moghazy	Independent
Minister of Housing, Utilities and Urban Development	Mostafa Madbouly	Independent
Minister of Supply and Internal Trade	Khaled Hanafy	Independent
Minister of Manpower and Immigration	Nahed Ashri	Independent
Minister of Religious Endowment (Awqaf)	Mukhtar Gomaa	Independent
Minister of Health	Adel El-Adawi	Independent
Minister of Civil Aviation	Mohammed Hassan Kamal	Independent
Minister of Social Solidarity	Ghada Wali	Independent
Minister of Planning and Administrative Reform	Ashraf El-Araby	Independent
Minister of Industry, Trade and Small Industries	Mounir Fakhry Abdel Nour	Wafd Party
Minister of Investment	Ashraf Salman	Independent
Minister of State for Youth and Sports	Khaled Abdel Aziz	Egypt Party
Minister of State for Military Production	Ibrahim Younis	Independent
Minister of State for Local Development	Adel Labib	Independent
Minister of State for Antiquities	Mamdouh Eldamaty	Independent
