= Mahlab Cabinet =

Mahlab Cabinet may refer to

- First Mahlab Cabinet, active from March–June 2014.
- Second Mahlab Cabinet, active from June 2014-March 2015.
- Third Mahlab Cabinet, active from March-September 2015.

== See also ==
- Ibrahim Mahlab
