= Islam in Egypt =

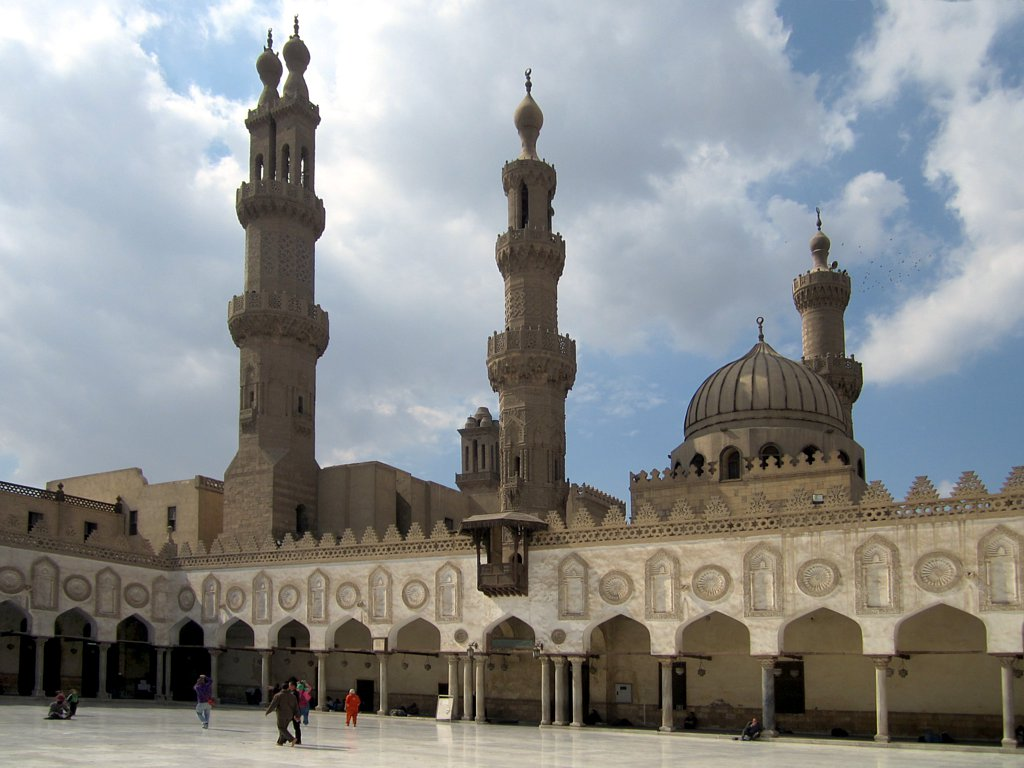
Al-Azhar Islamic university in Cairo Egypt, connected to a mosque built around 971, is considered by some Sunni Muslims as one of the world's highest Sunni Muslim authorities.

Islam is the dominant religion in Egypt, with approximately 90% of Egyptians identifying as Muslims. The majority of Egyptian Muslims are adherents of Sunni Islam, while a small minority adhere to Shia Islam. Since 1980, Islam has served as Egypt's state religion. Due to the lack of a religious census, owing to the alleged undercounting of non-Muslim minorities in Egyptian censuses, the actual percentage of Muslims is unknown; the percentage of Egyptian Christians, who are the second-largest religious group in the country, is usually estimated to be 10%.

A study at the University of Kent, citing a 2018 survey by Arab Barometer, stated that around 11% of Egyptians identified themselves as not religious. While in the same 2018 Wave survey, 47.2% of Egyptians said they were religious, 39.8% said they were somewhat religious and 10.4% said they were not religious. In the same Arab Barometer 2018 Wave V survey, it was reported that 90.4% said they were Muslim, 9.6% said they were Christian, and 0.1% said they had no religion.

Prior to the French campaign in Egypt and Syria under Napoleon Bonaparte, almost all of Egypt's educational, legal, public health, and social welfare issues were in the hands of religious functionaries. Under the Ottoman Empire, the public and political roles of the ulama (i.e., Muslim religious scholars) were reinforced, in an effective continuation of the policies of the Mamluk Sultanate. Traditionally, political divisions in the country were based on religious divisions. During the 19th and 20th centuries, successive governments made extensive efforts to limit the role of the ulama in public life, and religious institutions were increasingly brought under closer levels of state control.

After the Egyptian Revolution of 1952, the new government assumed responsibility for appointing officials to mosques and Islamic schools. Likewise, it mandated the reform of Al-Azhar University, beginning in 1961. These policies permitted department heads to be drawn from outside the ranks of the traditionally-trained orthodox ulama.

== History ==
=== Arab caliphate ===
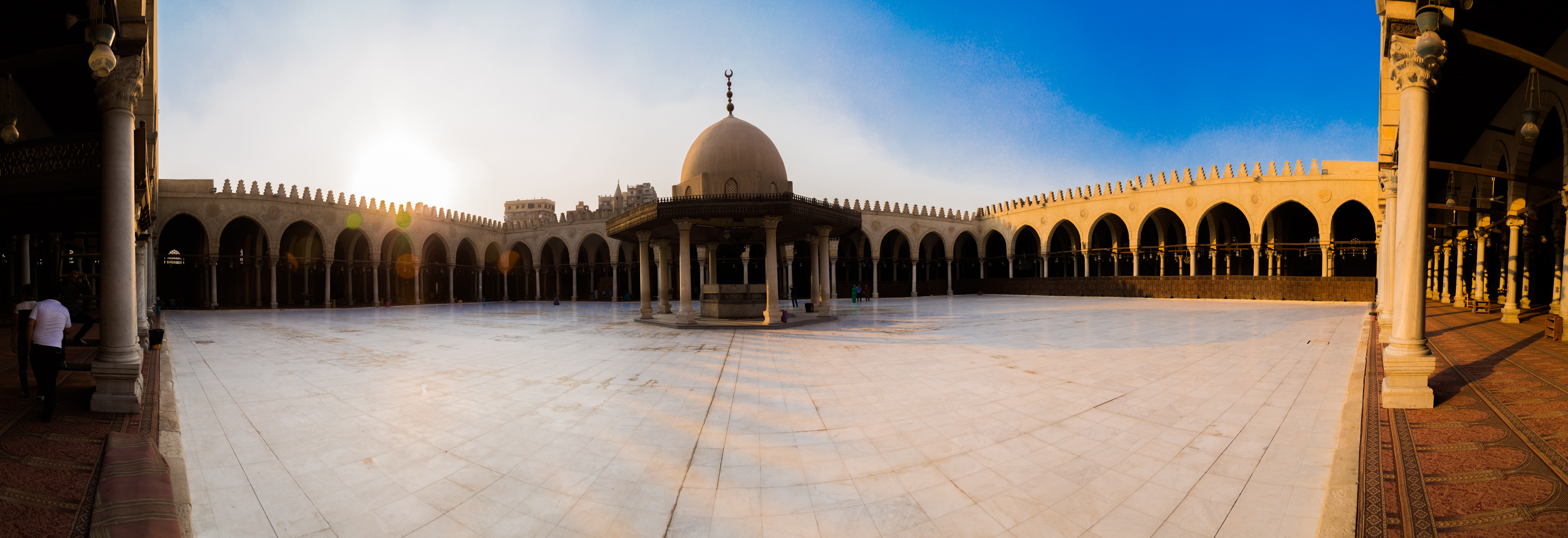
The Amr ibn al-As mosque in Cairo, recognized as the oldest in Africa

In the 7th century, Egypt was invaded and conquered by the Islamic caliphate by the Muslim Arabs. When they defeated the armies of Byzantine Empire in Egypt, the Arabs brought Islam to the country. In 639 an army of some 4,000 men were sent to Egypt by the second Rashidun caliph, Umar, under the command of Amr ibn al-As. This army was joined by another 5,000 men in 640 and defeated a Byzantine army at the battle of Heliopolis. Amr next proceeded in the direction of Alexandria, which was surrendered to him by a treaty signed on 8 November 641. Alexandria was regained for the Byzantine Empire in 645 but was retaken by Amr in 646. In 654 an invasion fleet sent by Constans II was repulsed. From that time no serious effort was made by the Byzantines to regain possession of the country. The Arabs founded the capital of Egypt called Fustat, which was later burned down during the Crusades. Cairo was later built in the year 986 to grow to become the largest and richest city in the Arab caliphate, and one of the biggest and richest in the world.

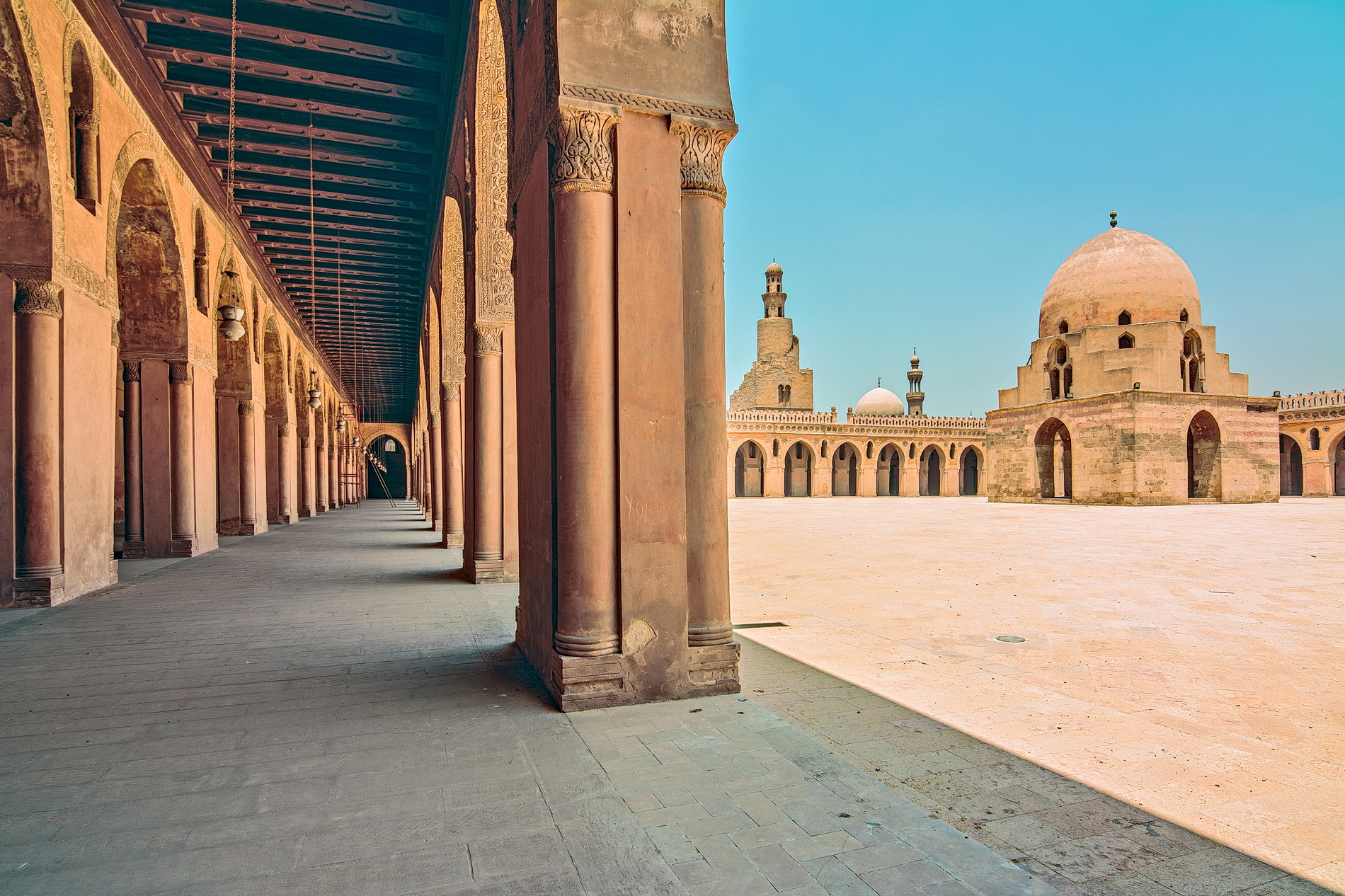
The Ibn Tulun Mosque in Cairo, of Ahmad Ibn Tulun

The Abbasid period was marked by new taxations, and the Copts revolted again in the fourth year of Abbasid rule. At the beginning of the 9th century the practice of ruling Egypt through a governor was resumed under Abdallah ibn Tahir, who decided to reside at Baghdad, sending a deputy to Egypt to govern for him. In 828 another Egyptian revolt broke out, and in 831 the Copts joined with native Muslims against the government. Eventually the power loss of the Abbasids in Baghdad has led for general upon general to take over rule of Egypt, yet being under Abbasid allegiance, the Tulunid dynasty (868–905) and Ikhshidid dynasty (935–969) were among the most successful to defy the Abbasid Caliph.

=== The Fatimids, Ayyubids and Mamluks ===
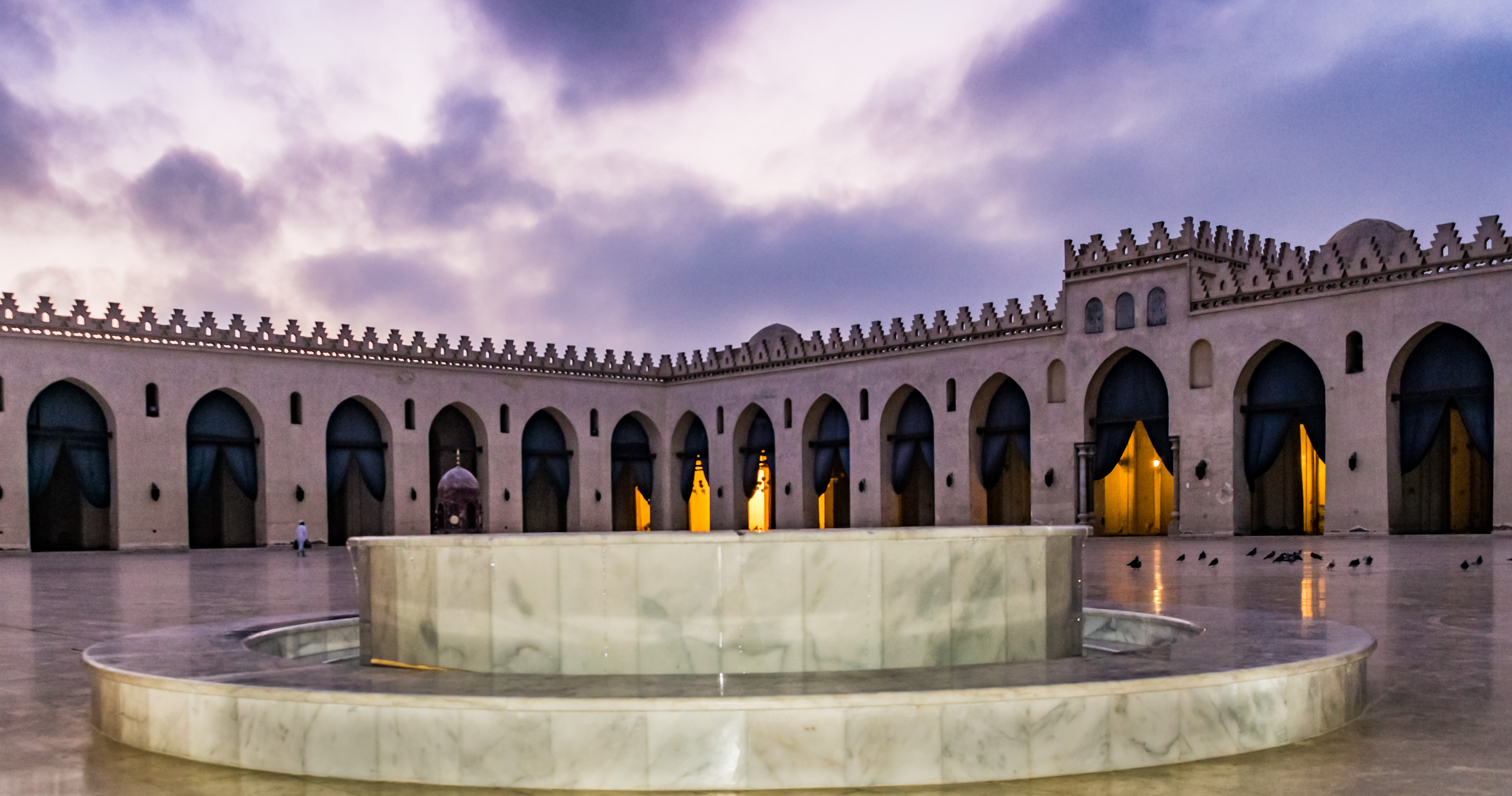
The Al-Hakim Mosque in Cairo, of Al-Hakim bi-Amr Allah, the sixth caliph, as renovated by Dawoodi Bohra

Muslim rulers remained in control of Egypt for the next six centuries, with Cairo as the seat of the Fatimid Caliphate. With the end of the Ayyubid dynasty, the Mamluks, a Turco-Circassian military caste, took control about 1250. By the late 13th century, Egypt linked the Red Sea, India, Malaya, and East Indies. The mid-14th-century Black Death killed about 40% of the country's population. In the late 10th century, the Shia Ismaili caliphate of the Fatimids made Egypt their centre and Cairo their capital. Egypt flourished and the Fatimids developed an extensive trade network in both the Mediterranean and the Indian Ocean. Their trade and diplomatic ties extended all the way to China and its Song dynasty, which eventually determined the economic course of Egypt during the High Middle Ages. Many traces of Fatimid architecture exist in Cairo today, the most defining examples include the Al Azhar University and the Al Hakim mosque. The Fatimid palace in Cairo had two parts. It stood in the Khan el-Khalili area on Bin El-Qasryn street.

In the early 20th century, Egyptian Islam was a complex and diverse religion. Although Muslims agreed on the faith's basic tenets, the country's various social groups and classes applied Islam differently in their daily lives. The literate theologians of Al-Azhar University generally rejected the version of Islam practiced by illiterate religious preachers and peasants in the countryside. Most upper- and upper-middle-class Muslims believed either that religious expression was a private matter for each individual or that Islam should play a more dominant role in public life. Islamic religious revival movements, whose appeal cut across class lines, were present in most cities and in many villages.

=== Islam and state ===
Muhammad Ali, who assumed power in Egypt in the early 1800s, nationalized all land, including hundreds of thousands of hectares of land belonging to Al Azhar Mosque, putting the funding of that institution under state control. This put an end to the political independence of the Ulama. Awqaf, traditionally independent endowments for mosques and Islamic schools, became a ministry of the government. In 1961, Gamal Abdel Nasser made Al Azhar part of the Ministry of Awqaf or Religious Endowments. He also made the appointment of the grand sheikh the prerogative of the Egyptian president, just as the appointment of any other state official. In time, the school became responsible for assigning imams to all major mosques, and all these imams were required to be graduates of the school.

=== Ulama ===
Orthodox ulama or "the religious establishment" found themselves in a difficult position during the wave of Islamic activism that swept through Egypt in the 1970s and 1980s. Most Ulama, including those of Al-Azhar University, are employees of the Egyptian state who "recognize the regime's primacy, support its stability, and legitimize its policies". Radical Islamists viewed them as puppets of the status quo. To maintain their influence in the country, the ulama espoused more conservative stances. After 1974, for example, many al-Azhar ulama, who had acquiesced to family planning initiatives in the 1960s, openly criticized government efforts at population control. The ulama also supported moves to reform the country's legal code to conform to Islamic teaching. They remained, nonetheless, comparatively moderate; they were largely loyal to the government and condemned the violence of radical Islamist groups. Outside of the state-mosques are more than 40,000 independent mosques throughout Egypt.

== Beliefs ==
=== Contemporary belief ===
Egyptian Muslims believe that Islam defines one's relationship to God, to other Muslims, and to non-Muslims. Some devout Muslims believe that there can be no dichotomy between the sacred and the secular. Many Muslims say that Egypt's governments have been secularist and even anti-religious since the early 1920s. Politically organized Muslims who seek to purge the country of its secular policies are referred to as "Islamists".

Egypt's largely uneducated urban and rural lower classes are intensely devoted to Islam, but they usually lack a thorough knowledge of the religion. Even village religious leaders usually have only a rudimentary knowledge of Islam. The typical village imam or prayer leader has at most a few years of schooling; his scholarly work was limited to reading prayers and sermons prepared by others and to learning passages from the Qur'an. Popular religion includes a variety of unorthodox practices, such as the veneration of saints, recourse to charms and amulets, and belief in the influence of evil spirits.

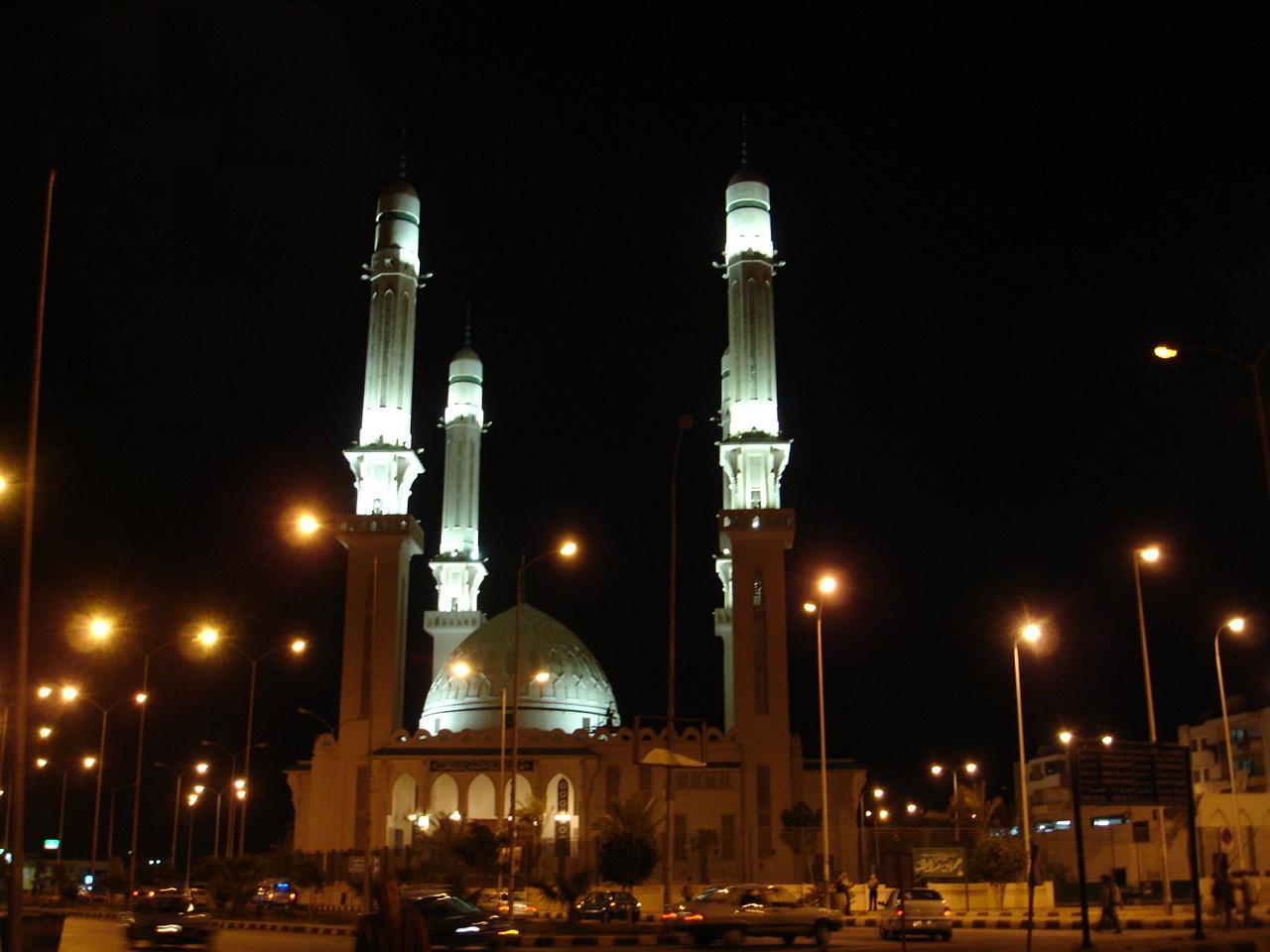
Masjid Hamza in Suez, Egypt

Popular Islam is based mostly on oral tradition. Imams with virtually no formal education commonly memorize the entire Qur'an and recite appropriate verses on religious occasions. They also tell religious stories at village festivals and commemorations marking an individual's rites of passage. Predestination plays an important role in popular Islam. This concept includes the belief that everything that happens in life is the will of God and the belief that trying to avoid misfortune is useless and invites worse affliction. Revelations from God in the Qur'an form the basis of Monotheism merged with a belief in angels, jinn and afarit (spirits).

Popular Islam ranges from informal prayer sessions or Qur'an study to organized cults or orders. Because of the pervasive sexual segregation of Egypt's Islamic society, men and women often practice their religion in different ways. A specifically female religious custom is the Zār, a ceremony for helping women placate spirits who are believed to have possessed them. Women specially trained by their mothers or other women in zar lore organize the ceremonies. A zar organizer holds weekly meetings and employs music and dance to induce ecstatic trances in possessed women. Wealthy women sometimes pay to have private zars conducted in their homes; these zars are more elaborate than public ones, last for several days, and sometimes involve efforts to exorcise spirits. However, while once common, the zar is rarely practiced today and is under fire because it is perceived as a religious heresy.

There are more than 45 million citizens 35 years old or younger. The Influence of digital/youth culture is found in preachers such as the very popular Amr Khaled who "maintains a disciplined focus on the lives, issues and problems of the upper middle classes"; espouses "living a comfortable life"; talks to youth about "getting closer to God" without changing one's lifestyle; promotes hijab while "joking about dating and flirting". The young "sheikhs" deliver their sermons over the Internet, on private satellite channels and in sports clubs, away from the control of Al-Azhar and the state.

=== Sufism ===
A primarily male spiritual manifestation of Islam is Sufism, an Islamic mystical tradition. It has been called the "default setting" of Muslim religious life in Egypt although many Sufis are thought to have voted for the Muslim Brotherhood Freedom and Justice Party.

Sufism exists in a number of forms, most of which represent an original tarika ("path") developed by an inspired founder, or sheikh. These sheikhs gradually gathered about themselves murids, or disciples, whom they initiated into the tarika. Gradually the murids formed orders, also known as turuq, which were loyal to the Sheikh or his successors (also called sheikhs). In Egypt there are 74 Sufi orders (tarikas), each headed by its own sheikh. Overseeing them is the Supreme Council for Sufi Orders and the president of Egypt is directly in charge of Sufi affairs.

The devotions of many Sufi orders center on various forms of the dhikr, a ceremony at which music, body movements, and chants induce a state of ecstatic trance in the disciples. Since the early 1970s, there has been a revival of interest in Sufism. Egypt's contemporary Sufis tend to be young, college-educated men in professional careers.

Estimates of the number of Sufis in Egypt include at least a third of the adult male Muslim population in Egypt, being members of a Sufi order; fifteen million of the country's roughly 80 million citizens "claim" Sufism "as a practice", still others say that while 15 million are registered as Sufis, "the true figure is likely to be higher". Participation at the festivals (moulids) the Sufi orders organize, is perhaps twice that (and includes women and children). The moulids are a major manifestation of Sufi Islam in Egypt, and are held in honor of holy men and women (In Egypt the term Moulid is not reserved for Muslim festivals and may be in honor of Christian, and until recently Jewish holy men). Sufi Muslim moulids not only venerate the prophet Muhammad and his descendants (such as Hussein, the second son of the fourth Caliph Ali whose moulid in Cairo can draws crowds of more than a million people), but founders of Sufi orders, down to dozens of lesser-known sheikhs celebrated mostly in remote rural communities. The largest moulid in Egypt takes place in Tanta, which draws an even larger number of pilgrims than hajj in Mecca. As many as three million Egyptians and other Arabs gather there every October to celebrate the life of Sayid Ahmad al-Badawi, a thirteenth-century Sufi leader. According to the Egyptian Ministry of Awqaf (Islamic charity), there are officially more than forty such annual commemorations, and the Sufi Council in Egypt lists eighty other festivals for lesser-known founders of Sufi orders.

According to a report issued by the Carnegie Endowment for International Peace,

Egypt's Islamic religious establishment is strongly Sufi in character. Adherence to a Sufi order has long been standard for both professors and students in the al-Azhar mosque and university system. Although al-Azhar is not monolithic, its identity has been strongly associated with Sufism. The current Shaykh al-Azhar (rector of the school), Ahmed el-Tayeb, is a hereditary Sufi shaykh from Upper Egypt who has recently expressed his support for the formation of a world Sufi league; the current Grand Mufti of Egypt and senior al-Azhar scholar Ali Gomaa is also a highly respected Sufi master.

=== Salafis ===
An estimated 5–6 million Egyptians are Salafis. Scholar Tarek Osman describes Salafis before the 2011 revolution as the "most important or pervasive Islamic force in the country" with an influence "many times more than that of organized political Islam." With "no history of violence, no organizational structure, no manifestos and no obvious political ambitions", they were tolerated by the Mubarak regime and ignored by the news media. The Salafi movement benefited from government support the 1990s when the government hoped to "combat and undermine" the violence of the Jihadi Salafi al-Gama'a al-Islamiyya with the preaching of the apolitical Salafis. It has also benefited from some of the $70 billion spent by Saudi Arabia to promote "Wahhabi" ideology worldwide through mosques, schools and books, that is similar or "virtually identical to Salafi beliefs and with which Sufis have had difficulty competing."

During the Mubarak era most Salafis considered participation in politics to be "religiously forbidden", however since then Salafis have shown themselves to be not only tolerant of political participation but very adept. In the 2011–12 Egypt parliamentary elections, the Islamist Bloc led by salafi Al-Nour Party received 27.8% of votes cast or 127 of the 498 parliamentary seats contested, second-place after the Muslim Brotherhood's Freedom and Justice Party. Al‑Nour party itself won 111 of the 127 seats.

Sufi Islam is a sore point with Salafi Muslims. Salafi and other Islamists believe Sufi tombs are unIslamic and have sometimes sabotaged or vandalized tombs and moulids.

=== Quranism ===
Non-sectarian Muslims who reject the authority of hadith, known as Quranists, Quraniyoon, or Ahl al-Quran, are also present in Egypt. During the early 20th century, the ideas of Egyptian Quranists like Muhammad Tawfiq Sidqi (1881–1920) are thought to have grown out of Salafism – specifically a rejection of taqlid. Notable Egyptian Quranists include Sidqi, Rashad Khalifa, Ahmed Subhy Mansour, and Tawfik Hamid.

=== Shia ===
While almost all of Egypt's Muslims are Sunni, there are a small number of Shia. (Estimates of their number range from 800,000 to "at most" three million.) The Syrian civil war has brought on an increase in anti-Shia rhetoric by Sunnis, harassment and arrest, and in at least one case bloodshed. In June 2013 a mob of several hundred, including Muslim brotherhood members, attacked a house in the village of Abu Musallim near Cairo, dragging four Shia worshipers through the street before lynching them. Eight other Shia were injured.

=== Ahmadiyya ===
The Ahmadiyya movement in Egypt, which numbers up to 50,000 adherents in the country, was established in 1922 but has seen an increase in hostility and government repression as of the 21st century. The Al-Azhar University has denounced the Ahmadis and Ahmadis have been hounded by police along with other Muslim groups deemed to be deviant under Egypt's defamation laws. On 15 March 2010, nine Ahmadis were detained due to their adherence to the movement.

=== Nondenominational Muslims ===
There are a significant amount of Nondenominational Muslims in Egypt. Roughly twelve percent of Egyptians, when asked about their religious affiliation, answered that they were "just a Muslim" or "just Muslim". Their lack of identifying with a particular sect was noteworthy. Besides Kosovo, Egypt has had the largest positive net change of Muslims identifying as non-denominational Muslims. Roughly five percent of Egyptian Muslims who were raised in a different affiliation began identifying as non-denominational Muslims as adults.

== State involvement ==
The Ministry of Awqaf or Religious Endowments, oversees mosques in Egypt. There are more than 110,000 mosques registered with the state in Egypt. The ministry assigns ulama to registered mosques, which critics complain inevitably involves favoritism and political connections.

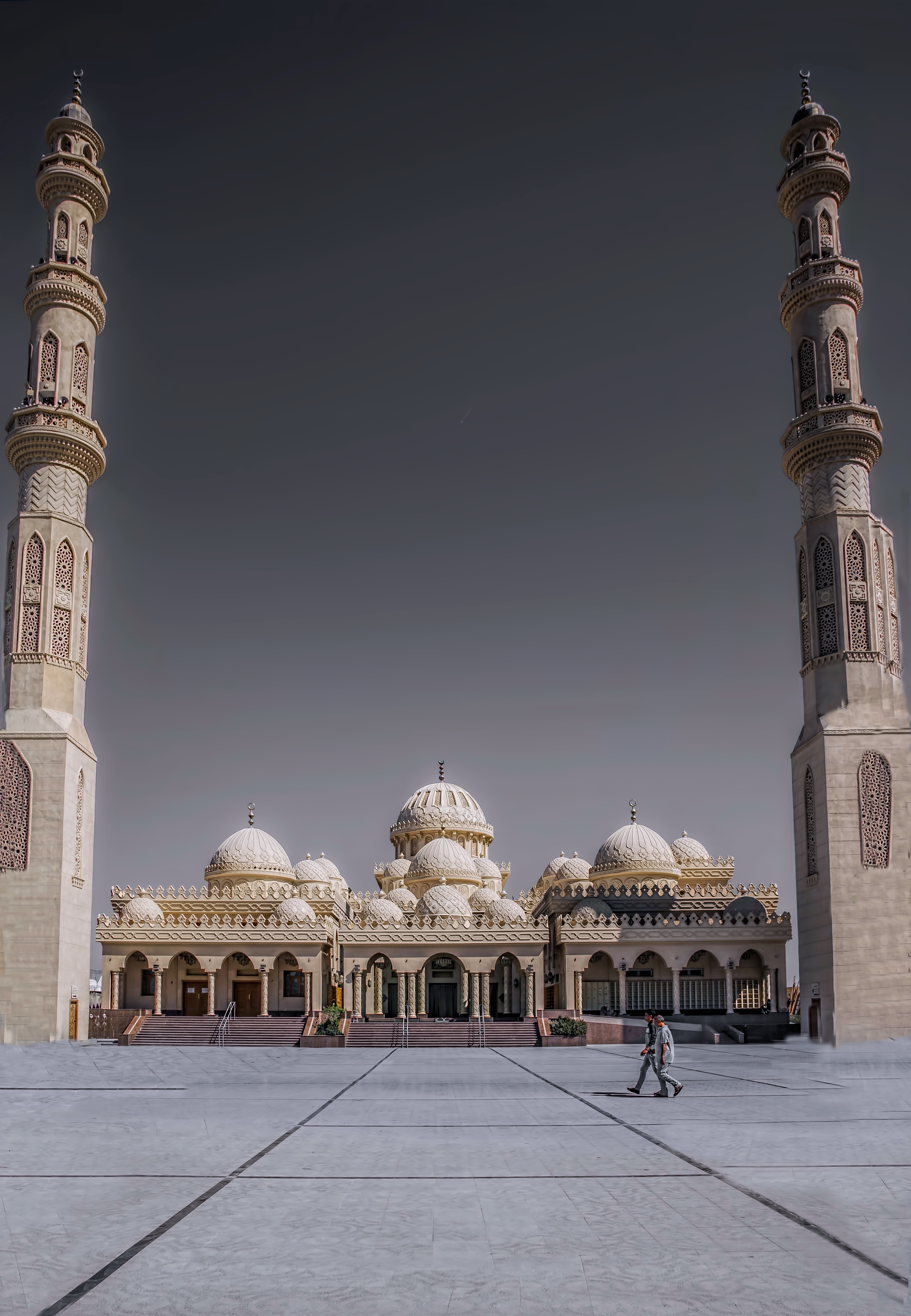
Al-Mina Mosque in Hurghada, Egypt.

In the wake of the 2013 coup the state imposed tighter controls on mosques. The Awqaf Ministry command the mosques be locked between prayer times and took control of donation boxes. In September 2013 it declared that only imams who had graduated from Al Azhar University (estimated at 58,000) would be allowed to hold Friday sermons. This effectively banned an estimated 53,000 imams from preaching in mosques, although it is not clear if this edict can be enforced. In 2015, the Egyptian Ministry of Religious Endowments initiated a campaign to remove any books authored by Salafi scholars from all mosques in Egypt.

Critics have complained that the actions of Awqaf reflect the government that controls them. Mahmoud Zakzouk, Minister of Awqaf from 1995 to the Egyptian Revolution of 2011, was appointed by Mubarak and dismissed at his overthrow. Under the Mohamed Morsi government, critics alleged the Muslim Brotherhood put "its allies in high positions". And under the post-coup government the new Awqaf minister is reportedly "quietly purging all Brotherhood appointees".

== Clothing ==
The hijab became more unpopular with educated women, including devout Muslims, in the early 20th century as the British authorities discouraged it and as women sought to gain modern positions of power. The hijab became more popular in the 1970s, with women choosing to adopt it.

In 2012, Misr International films was producing a television series based on the novel Zaat by Sonallah Ibrahim. Filming of scenes set at Ain Shams University was scheduled to occur that year, but Muslim Brotherhood student members and some teachers at the school protested, stating that the 1970s era clothing worn by the actresses was indecent and that they would not allow filming unless the clothing was changed. Gaby Khoury, the head of the film company, stated that engineering department head Sherif Hammad "insisted that the filming should stop and that we would be reimbursed ... explaining that he was not able to guarantee the protection of the materials or the artists."

== Islamic political movements ==
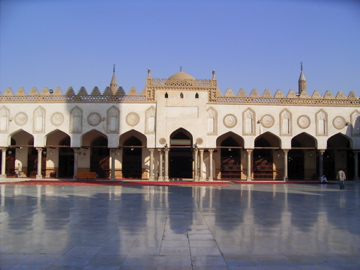
Al-Azhar Mosque in Cairo, Egypt.

Islamic political activism has a lengthy history in Egypt. Several Islamic political groups started soon after World War I ended. The most well-known Islamic political organization is the Muslim Brotherhood (Al Ikhwan al Muslimun, also known as the Brotherhood), founded in 1928 by Hassan al Banna. After World War II, the Muslim Brotherhood acquired a reputation as a radical group prepared to use violence to achieve its religious goals. The group was implicated in several assassinations, including the murder of one prime minister. The Brotherhood had contacts with the Free Officers before the 1952 Revolution and supported most of their initial policies. The Brotherhood, however, soon came into conflict with Gamal Abdel Nasser. The government accused the Brotherhood of complicity in an alleged 1954 plot to assassinate the president and imprisoned many of the group's leaders. In the 1970s, Anwar Sadat amnestied the leaders and permitted them to resume some of their activities. But by that time, the Brotherhood was divided into at least three factions. The more militant faction was committed to a policy of political opposition to the government. A second faction advocated peaceful withdrawal from society and the creation, to the extent possible, of a separate, parallel society based upon Islamic values and law. The dominant moderate group advocated cooperation with the regime.

The Muslim Brotherhood's reemergence as a political force coincided with the proliferation of Islamic groups. Some of these groups espoused the violent overthrow of the government while others espoused living a devout life of rigorous observance of religious practices. It is impossible to list all the Islamic groups that emerged in the late 1970s because many of them had diffuse structures and some of the more militant groups were underground. Egypt's defeat and loss of territory in the June 1967 Six-Day War was the main cause for the growth of religiously inspired political activism. Muslims tended to view the humiliating experience as the culmination of 150 years of foreign intrusion and an affront to their vision of a true Islamic community. Islamic tradition rejected the idea of non-Muslims dominating Muslim society. Such a state of affairs discredited Muslim rulers who permitted it to persist. It was, therefore, incumbent on believers to end the domination and restore the true supremacy of Islam. As part of their Sunni creed, the most radical activists adopted jihad and committed themselves to battling unbelievers and impious Muslims. During the 1970s and 1980s, Islamists perpetrated a number of violent acts, including the assassination of Anwar Sadat in October 1981.

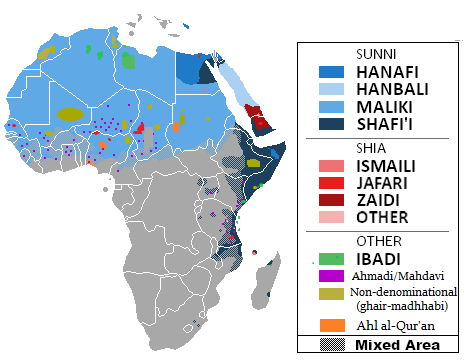
Egypt mostly colored baby blue (Maliki Sunni) south; Brandeis blue (Hanafi Sunni) north, Prussian blue (Shafi'i Sunni) east

Disruptive social changes and Sadat's relative tolerance toward political parties contributed to the rapid growth of Islamic groups in the 1970s. On university campuses, for example, Sadat initially viewed the rise of Islamic associations (Gama'at Islamiya) as a counterbalance to leftist influence among students. The Gama'at Islamiya spread quite rapidly on campuses and won up to one-third of all student union elections. These victories provided a platform from which the associations campaigned for Islamic dress, the veiling of women, and the segregation of classes by gender. Secular university administrators opposed these goals. In 1979 Sadat sought to diminish the influence of the associations through a law that transferred most of the authority of the student unions to professors and administrators. During the 1980s, however, Islamists gradually penetrated college faculties. At Asyut University, which was the scene of some of the most intense clashes between Islamists and their opponents (including security forces, secularists, and Copts), the president and other top administrators—who were Islamists—supported Gama'at Islamiya demands to end mixed-sex classes and to reduce total female enrollment. Public opinion in Egypt supported political Islam to some extent, one poll in the mid-1980s found 96% of Egyptian Muslims favoring the application of the Sharia.

As of 1989, the Islamists sought to make Egypt a community of the faithful based on their vision of an Islamic social order. They rejected conventional, secularist social analyses of Egypt's socioeconomic problems. They maintained, for example, that the causes of poverty were not overpopulation or high defense expenditures but the populace's spiritual failures—laxness, secularism, and corruption. The solution was a return to the simplicity, hard work, and self-reliance of earlier Muslim life. The Islamists created their own alternative network of social and economic institutions through which members could work, study, and receive medical treatment in an Islamic environment.

Islamists rejected Marxism and Western capitalism. Indeed, they viewed atheistic communism, Jewish Zionism, and Western "Crusader-minded" Christianity as their main enemies, which were responsible for the decadence that led to foreign domination and defeat by Zionists. They were intolerant of people who did not share their worldview. Islamists tended to be hostile toward the orthodox ulama, especially the scholars at Al Azhar who frequently criticized the Islamists' extreme religious interpretations. Islamists believed that the established social and political order had tainted the ulama, who had come to represent stumbling blocks to the new Islamic order. In addition, Islamists condemned the orthodox as "pulpit parrots" committed to a formalist practice of Islam but not to its spirit.

The social origins of Islamists changed after the 1952 Revolution. In the 1940s and early 1950s, the Muslim Brotherhood had appealed primarily to urban civil servants and white and blue-collar workers. After the early 1970s, the Islamic revival attracted followers from a broad spectrum of social classes. Most activists were university students or recent graduates; they included rural-urban migrants and urban middle-class youth whose fathers were mid-level government employees or professionals. Their fields of study—medicine, engineering, military science, and pharmacy—were among the most highly competitive and prestigious disciplines in the university system. The rank-and-file members of Islamist groups came from the middle class, the lower-middle class, and the urban working class.

Various Islamist groups espoused different means for achieving their political agenda. All Islamists, however, were concerned with Islam's role in the complex and changing society of Egypt in the late twentieth century. A common focus of their political efforts has been to incorporate Shari'a into the country's legal code. In deference to their increasing influence, the Ministry of Justice in 1977 published a draft law making apostasy by a Muslim a capital offense and proposing traditional Islamic punishments for crimes, such as stoning for adultery and amputation of a hand for theft. In 1980 Egypt supported a referendum that proposed a constitutional amendment to make Shari'a "the sole source of law." The influence of the Islamists temporarily waned in the aftermath of Sadat's assassination in 1981, but the election of nine members of the Muslim Brotherhood to the People's Assembly in 1984 revived Islamists' prospects. In 1985, the People's Assembly voted to initiate a procedure for the gradual application of Shari'a, beginning with an indefinite education period to prepare the population for the legal changes; the next step would be to amend all existing laws to exclude any provisions that conflict with Shari'a. Moves to reform the legal code received support from many Muslims who wanted to purify society and reject Western legal codes forced on Egypt in the 19th and 20th centuries. As of 2009, the Grand Mufti also has another title, Dar al-Iftaa, a part of the Ministry of Justice. While his rulings are nonbinding, they are "influential." His office issues 5,000 fatwas a week.

By the beginning of the 21st century, only the Gama'at Islamiya leaders who were in prison after the assassination of Sadat were released after several books they wrote and interviews showed that they revised their points of view and changed the radical tone of their speeches.

== Status of religious freedom ==
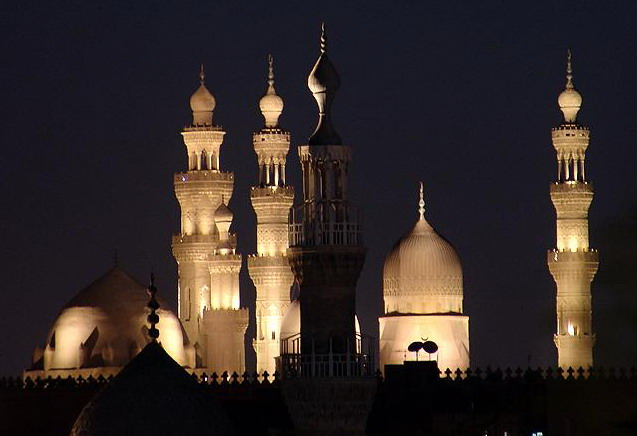
Historical and ancient mosques in Cairo.

The Constitution provides for freedom of belief and the practice of religion; however, the Government places restrictions on this right. According to the Constitution, Islam is the official state religion, and Shari'a is the primary source of legislation; religious practices that conflict with the official interpretation of Shari'a are prohibited. However, since the Government does not consider the practice of Christianity or Judaism to conflict with Shari'a, for the most part members of the non-Muslim minority worship without legal harassment and may maintain links with coreligionists in other countries. Members of other religions that are not recognized by the Government, such as the Baháʼí Faith, may experience personal and collective hardship.

An 1856 Ottoman decree still in force requires non-Muslims to obtain a presidential decree to build a place of worship. In addition Interior Ministry regulations issued in 1934 specify a set of 10 conditions that the Government must consider prior to issuance of a presidential decree permitting construction of a church. These conditions include the location of the proposed site, the religious composition of the surrounding community, and the proximity of other churches. The Ottoman decree also requires the President to approve permits for the repair of church facilities.

In December 1999, in response to strong criticism of the Ottoman decree, President Mubarak issued a decree making the repair of all places of worship subject to a 1976 civil construction code. The decree is significant symbolically because it places churches closer to an equal footing with mosques before the law. The practical impact of the decree has been to facilitate significantly church repairs; however, Christians report that local permits still are subject to security authorities' approval. The approval process for church construction continued to be time-consuming and insufficiently responsive to the wishes of the Christian community. As a result of these restrictions, some communities use private buildings and apartments for religious services.

According to a 1995 law, the application of family law, including marriage, divorce, alimony, child custody, inheritance, and burial, is based on an individual's religion. In the practice of family law, the State recognizes only the three "heavenly religions": Islam, Christianity, and Judaism. Muslim families are subject to the Personal Status Law, which draws on Shari'a (Islamic law). Christian families are subject to canon law, and Jewish families are subject to Jewish law. In cases of family law disputes involving a marriage between a Christian woman and a Muslim man, the courts apply the Personal Status Law.

Under Islamic law, non-Muslim males must convert to Islam to marry Muslim women. Christian and Jewish women need not convert to marry Muslim men. Muslim women are prohibited from marrying Christian men. Muslim female heirs receive half the amount of a male heir's inheritance, while Christian widows of Muslims have no inheritance rights. A sole female heir receives half her parents' estate; the balance goes to designated male relatives. A sole male heir inherits all his parents' property. Male Muslim heirs face strong social pressure to provide for all family members who require assistance; however, this assistance is not always provided. In January 2000, the Parliament passed a new Personal Status Law that made it easier for a Muslim woman to obtain a divorce without her husband's consent, provided that she is willing to forgo alimony and the return of her dowry. However, an earlier provision of the draft law that would have made it easier for a woman to travel without her husband's consent, was rejected. Although later in 2000, after a court ruling, Egyptian women were given the right to apply for a passport and travel without the husband's consent.

== See also ==
- Christianity in Egypt
- Islam by country
- Muslim Youth uprising
- Religion in Egypt
