= Mahfouz Saber =

Egyptian politician and judge

Minister of Justice
- In office 17 June 2014 – 11 May 2015
- President: Abdel Fattah el-Sisi
- Prime Minister: Ibrahim Mahlab
- Succeeded by: Ahmed El-Zend

Personal details
- Born: 1945 Gharbia Governorate, Kingdom of Egypt
- Died: 24 February 2023 (aged 77–78)
- Occupation: Judge

Mahfouz Saber (1945 – 24 February 2023) was an Egyptian politician and judge. He served as Minister of Justice in the Second and Third Mahlab Cabinet. He was in office from 17 June 2014 until he resigned on 11 May 2015.

== Biography ==
Saber was born in Gharbia Governorate in 1945. He obtained his law degree in 1965 from Alexandria University. From 1980 to 1992 he worked in various positions as prosecutor and attorney general. From 2009 he served as assistant minister of justice for judicial inspection. Saber was Secretary-General of the High Election Committee for the Parliamentary elections of 2011–12. In 2012 he became first assistant minister of justice. On 1 July 2013 he was named president of Ismailia court of appeal. He later also served as president of the Mansoura and Alexandria courts of appeal.

Before his appointment as Minister of Justice in the Second Mahlab Cabinet on 17 June 2014 Saber was head of the disciplinary department at Cairo Appeal Court.

He resigned on 11 May 2015 after stating that judges needed to come from "a respectable milieu" and that the son of a trash collector "would get depressed and would not continue" as a judge. His remarks obtained criticism for being elitist. Prime Minister Ibrahim Mahlab stated that Saber had resigned out of respect for the public opinion. Saber was succeeded by Ahmed El-Zend, who would later also lose his position over comments he made in public.

He died on 24 February 2023, aged 78.
