= Omar F. Mohammed =

Professor at the King Abdullah University of Science and Technology

- Born: Omar Abdelsaboor Mohammed; Egypt
- Education: Assiut University (BSc, MSc); Humboldt University of Berlin (PhD)
- Known for: Perovskite solar cells, X-ray imaging scintillators, four-dimensional electron imaging
- Awards: Kuwait Prize in Condensed Matter Physics (2021); Shoman Prize (2022); Fellow of the Royal Society of Chemistry (2021); Fellow of the Institute of Physics (2023); Fellow of the American Physical Society (2025); Fellow of Optica (2026)
- Scientific career
- Fields: Physical Chemistry, Material Sciences, Ultrafast Spectroscopy
- Workplaces: King Abdullah University of Science and Technology
- Thesis: Femtosecond IR spectroscopy of photochromic molecules in solution

Omar F. Mohammed (born Omar Abdelsadoor Mohammed) is a physical chemist and material scientist who holds a professorship at the King Abdullah University of Science and Technology (KAUST), where he serves as the chair of the Material Sciences and Applied Physics program. His research focuses on ultrafast laser spectroscopy, electron imaging, and charge carrier dynamics in solar cells.

== Early life and education ==
Mohammed was educated at Assiut University, completing a bachelor's of science in Chemistry in 1995. He continued his education with a master's of science in chemistry from the same university, graduating in 1999. In 2006, he completed his Ph.D in Physical and Theoretical Chemistry at Humboldt University's Max-Born Institute.

== Career ==
Following his doctorate, Mohammed took postdoctoral positions at Riken in Japan and the University of Geneva, before eventually becoming a senior research associate at Caltech. At Caltech, he worked in the lab of nobel laureate Ahmed Zewail, studying laser spectroscopy and electron imaging techniques.

In 2012, Mohammed joined the faculty of KAUST as an assistant professor. In 2019, he was promoted to associate professor, and in 2022 he was made a full professor. He is a professor in the Engineering and Physical Sciences division and chairs the Materials Science and Applied Physics program.

Mohammed has been recognized as a fellow by a number of institutions, including the American Physical Society, the Royal Society of Chemistry, the Institute of Physics, and Optica. He has also been the recipient of both regional and international awards and recognitions. In recognition of his work, Mohammed has been invited to present as a guest lecturer at other universities.

Dr. Mohammed's research has primarily focused on optical physics and material sciences. His doctoral thesis was titled Femtosecond IR spectroscopy of photochromic molecules in solution, and his work with spectroscopy continued through his career. In particular, he has received acclaim for his work in ultrafast laser spectroscopy. He has also participated in material science research, helping develop more efficient solar panels, light-emitting diodes, and x-ray scintillators.

== Awards and fellowships ==
- Egyptian State Prize in Basic Sciences (2010)
- Clarivate Highly Cited Researchers List (2019-2024)
- Kuwait Prize in Condensed matter physics (2021)
- Royal Society of Chemistry fellowship (2021)
- Shoman Foundation's Shoman Prize in Photochemistry (2022)
- Institute of Physics fellowship (2023)
- APS fellowship (2025)
- Optica fellowship (2026)
