= Assiut University Hospitals =

Coordinates: 27.18556°N 31.16572°E

Assiut University Hospitals are considered among the largest university and therapeutic hospitals in Egypt. They were inaugurated by President Hosni Mubarak in 1987. The total number of hospital beds is approximately three thousand, with 92% being free beds, and 8% are special care and economic beds, including contracts with government and non-governmental agencies. The revenue from these beds is allocated to the expenses of the free service and for patients who are unable to pay.

In 2024, Assiut University Hospitals opened the Emergency and Trauma Hospital to expand its medical services. The facility includes a trauma unit with 20 examination beds, 15 resuscitation beds, and an emergency operating room, equipped with ultrasound and X-ray machines. The hospital also features a 46-bed intensive care unit and eight major operating rooms for surgical specialties. This expansion is part of an initiative to develop the university’s medical infrastructure.

== Hospitals ==
- Main University Hospital
- University Children's Hospital
- Women's Health Hospital
- Al-Rajhi Liver Hospital
- Urology and Nephrology Hospital
- Psychiatric and Neurological Hospital
- Orman University Heart Hospital
- New Assiut University Hospital
- Trauma and Emergency Hospital
- Umm Al Qusour Hospital
- Emergency and Trauma Hospital
