= Mahmoud Abo El-Nasr =

Egyptian engineering professor and politician

Mahmoud Mohamed Mahmoud Abo El-Nasr (born 1953) is an Egyptian engineering professor and politician. He was the minister of education in the interim government of Hazem Al Beblawi and held the position in the interim government of Ibrahim Mahlab.

== Biography ==
Mahmoud Abo El-Nasr received PhD from Reading University, England in 1986, and went on to do post-doctoral work at Washington State University. He has been department head, dean, university vice president and professor of mechanical engineering at the Ain Shams University. In September 2010 he joined the ministry of education as deputy minister, leading the ministry's technical education sector.

He was sworn into the Egyptian cabinet as minister of education on 16 July 2013. He replaced Ibrahim Deif in the post. On 23 July Nasr announced that the ministry was considering delaying the start of the next school year, to ensure textbooks were fully available. He is part of the Second Mahlab Cabinet.
