= Abdel Nasser Tawfik =

Egyptian physicist (born 1967)

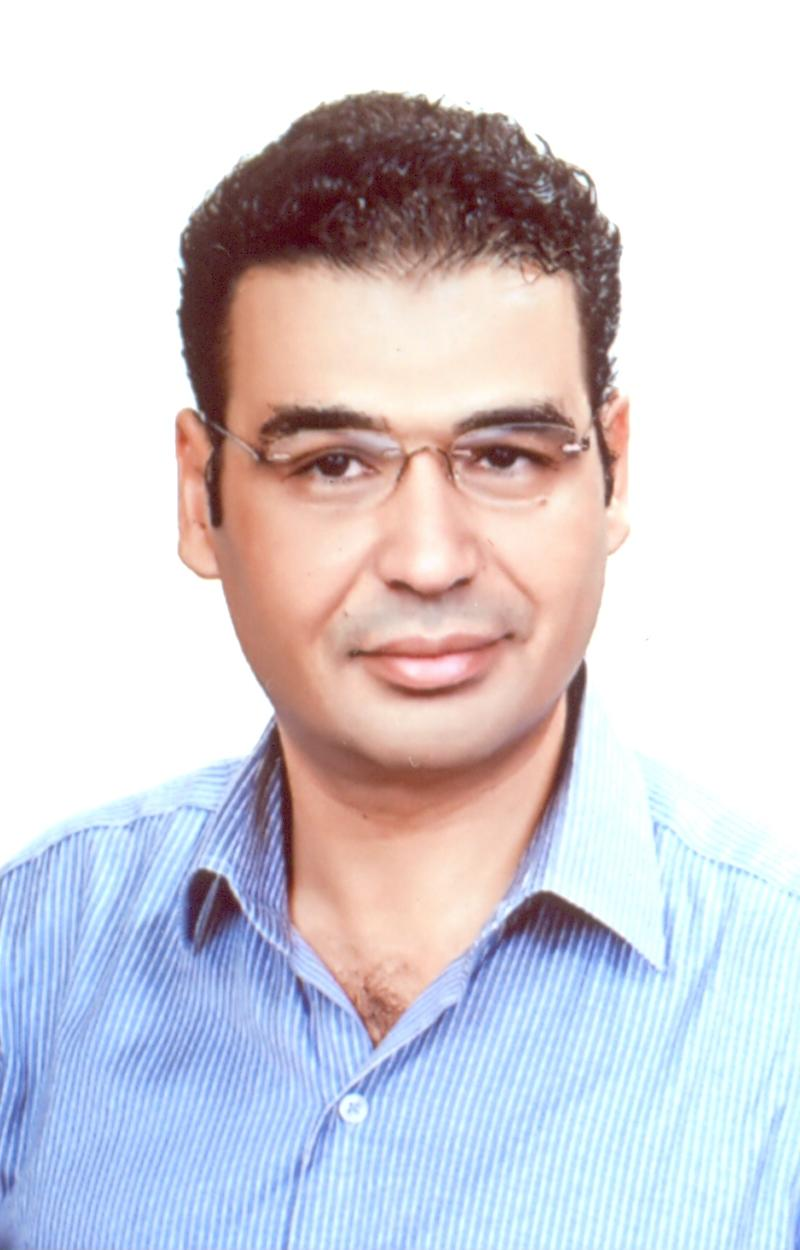
- Born: June 22, 1967 (age 59)
- Known for: Viscous early universe, Quantum chromodynamics phase diagram, Chemical freeze-out curve, Quantum entropy of quark matter, Quantum phase transitions
- Awards: TWAS-ARO Prize in Public Understanding and Popularization of Science (2017), TWAS Fellow (2012), JSPS Fellow (2005–2006), DAAD Prize (1997)
- Scientific career
- Fields: Theoretical Physics
- Institutions: Assiut University, Philipps University of Marburg, German Space Agency, University of Trier, University of Stuttgart, Bielefeld University, Hiroshima University

Abdel Nasser Tawfik (Arabic: عبدالناصر توفيق; born June 22, 1967) graduated from Assiut University in 1989, where he also completed his master's degree (M.Sc.) in theoretical physics before his change to the Philipps University of Marburg, Germany, for the Dr.rer.Nat. (Ph.D.) in high energy physics. In 2012 Tawfik earned his Doctor of Science degree in mathematics and physics at the Uzbekistan National University. Dr. Tawfik is the Founder Director of the Egyptian Center For Theoretical Physics (ECTP), the Founder Director of the World Laboratory for Cosmology And Particle Physics (WLCAPP), and Research Director at the "ICSC – World Laboratory" in Geneva, Switzerland. Currently, Abdel Nasser Tawfik works as Math and Physics teacher at DEO, and jointly affiliated to Frankfurt Institute for Advanced Studies (FIAS) - Goethe Frankfurt University, Germany. He is the Spokesperson of the Federation for Egyptian Particle Scientists (FEPS) and Associate of the Nuclear Physics Institute of Uzbekistan Academy of Sciences. In 1998, he was awarded the DAAD-prize for "Hervorragende Leistungen ausländischer Studierender an den deutschen Hochschulen". At the 23rd General Meeting of TWAS held in Tianjin, China, on 18 September 2012, he was elected as Fellow of TWAS. Tawfik is the author of four books, and has published about 170 research papers in leading journals.

Dr. Tawfik is team leader of Egyptian Scientists joining the Compact Muon Solenoid experiment (CMS) at the Large Hadron Collider (LHC), team leader of another Egyptian team joining the STAR experiment at the Relativistic Heavy Ion Collider (RHIC), team leader of a third team working for the Compact Baryon Matter (CBM) experiment at Facility for Antiproton and Ion Research (FAIR), and a fourth one for the Multi Purpose Detector (MPD) experiment at the Nuclotron-based Ion Collider fAcility (NICA).

Professor D.Sc. Tawfik worked at numerous universities and research institutions including Fraunhofer Society, German Space Agency, University of Marburg, University of Trier, University of Stuttgart and Bielefeld University. He also joined Hiroshima University during 2005–2006.

== Recent outreach work ==
Tawfik has published various articles in newspapers and magazines on a wide range of public issues, and public lectures on science and its different impacts with the aim to improve the rate and quality of development in Egypt.

Tawfik introduced numerical simulations for lattice field theory to Egypt. For these techniques, one needs powerful computing facilities and effective numerical algorithms. Their results should greatly impact our understanding of matter under extreme conditions, including the phase transitions and the early universe. The evolution equations of various cosmological parameters in the background QCD matter in early universe are subjects of his recent papers.

== Awards ==
- TWAS council member for the period from 2016 until 2022
- TWAS-ARO Prize n Public Understanding and Popularization of Science 2017
- Fellow of TWAS. election in September 2012
- Japanese Society for the Promotion of Science Fellow 2005–2006 (JSPS)
- Fraunhofer Society (German: Fraunhofer-Gesellschaft) Post-Doc, Institute for Telematics, 1999
- DAAD Prize for the Outstanding Achievements at University of Marburg 1997

== Scientific achievements ==
Tawfik's major scientific accomplishments are the viscous early Universe and acceleration mechanisms for ultra-high-energy cosmic rays (UHECR). Tawfik's Achievements to the physical sciences include mapping up the Quantum Chromodynamics phase diagram, mapping up the chemical freeze-out curve, determining the quantum entropy of quark matter, and localizing the quantum phase transition.

== Books ==
- TRANSPORT PROPERTIES OF QUARK-GLUON PLASMA: Implications on Early Universe, Lambert Academic Publishing, Saarbruecken-Germany 2012, 269 Pages, ISBN 978-3-659-14955-9
- Kritische Studien zu der Teilchenkorrelation und den Signaturen des Phasenübergangs in zentralen Blei-Blei Stößen bei 158 GeV pro Nukleon (in German), Tectum Verlag, Marburg-Germany, 1999, 231 Pages, ISBN 978-3-8288-0598-9

== Activities ==
Tawfik is a member of the editorial board of the International Journal of Theoretical and Mathematical Physics (IJTMP), Journal of Particle Physics Insights, and Transactions of Theoretical Physics.
