= Gamal Helal =

Egyptian-American diplomat (born 1954)

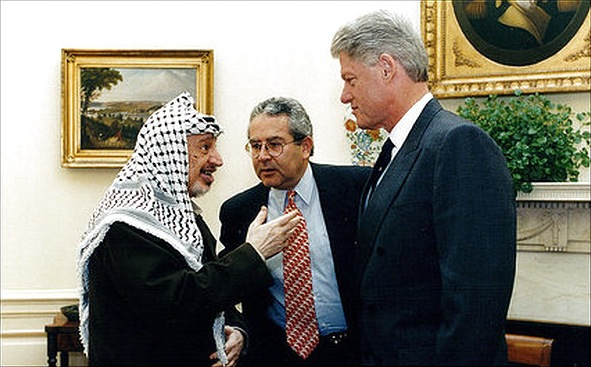
- Helal interpreting for Yasser Arafat and Bill Clinton in 1998
- Born: Gamal Helal; March 22, 1954 (age 71); Asyut, Egypt
- Citizenship: Egyptian; American (since 1983)
- Education: Assiut University (BA); School for International Training (MA)
- Occupations: Interpreter; diplomat
- Known for: Arabic interpreter for U.S. presidents and secretaries of state in Middle East diplomacy
- Title: Senior Diplomatic Interpreter

Gamal Helal (born March 22, 1954) is an Egyptian-American interpreter and diplomat who translated on behalf of multiple Presidents of the United States and Secretaries of State.

== Early life ==
Helal, a Coptic Christian, was born in Asyut, Egypt, in 1954 and went on to study at Assiut University, where he earned a bachelor of arts. When he was 21 years old, he left Egypt for the United States, studying at Vermont's School for International Training where he received an master's degree in cross-culture communication. In 1983, Helal became a U.S. citizen.

== Diplomatic career ==
Helal began his diplomatic career in the mid-1980s when he joined the United States Department of State. In the lead-up to the Gulf War, he interpreted for Secretary of State James Baker and Iraqi emissary Tariq Aziz at a meeting in Geneva, Switzerland, at which time Aziz was presented with an ultimatum to withdraw troops from Kuwait.

By 1993, Helal was a senior diplomatic interpreter, and later senior policy adviser to Dennis Ross, then the special Middle East coordinator under President Bill Clinton. Ross, reflecting on his engagement in the Israeli-Palestinian peace process, stated that "Most of my meetings with Yasser Arafat would start off with my delegation, but the real work would be done with just Arafat, me and Gamal." Helal interpreted between Clinton and Arafat during the 2000 Camp David Summit, and was once tasked to speak alone with Arafat to try to convince him of the opportunity of the Israeli offer.

Helal continued to work under President George W. Bush and with Secretary of State Condoleezza Rice, and was an interpreter and senior adviser on the Middle East for the Barack Obama administration until he left in October 2009 to launch his own consulting business, named Helal Enterprises.
