= Ibrahim Ghoneim =

Egyptian politician

Minister of Education
- In office 2 August 2012 – 16 July 2013
- Prime Minister: Hisham Qandil
- Preceded by: Gamal El-Araby
- Succeeded by: Mahmoud Abo El Nasr

Personal details
- Born: Ibrahim Ahmed Ghoneim Deif; 29 October 1962 (age 63)
- Party: Independent
- Education: Assuit University

Ibrahim Ahmed Ghoneim Deif (born 29 October 1962) is an Egyptian academic and the former minister of education as part of the Qandil cabinet.

== Early life and education ==
Deif was born on 29 October 1962. He received a bachelor of science degree in power mechanics from Assiut University in May 1984. He also obtained his master of science degree and PhD from the same university in 1990 and 1994, respectively. His field of speciality is curriculum design.

== Career ==
Deif started his career as a teaching assistant at Assiut University in 1984. He worked at the same university at different posts until 2005. Then he began to work at Suez Canal University in 2005. He was elected as the dean of the faculty of education at Suez Canal University in 2008. Then he became the vice president of Suez Canal University for Suez Branch Affairs on 29 March 2012. His term will last until 28 March 2016.

Deif was appointed Egypt's minister of education on 2 August 2012. He has no political affiliation, and therefore, was one of the independent ministers in the Qandil cabinet. His term ended on 16 July 2013 and Mahmoud Abo El Nasr replaced him in the post.

=== Criticism ===
In October 2012, Deif reported his acceptance of the corporal punishment in schools "as long as the beating is not severe and no stick is used." Upon his declaration, the Coalition for Children's Rights in Egypt submitted a lawsuit to Egypt's general prosecutor against Deif.
