= Adel Younis =

Egyptian jurist and politician (died 1976)

Minister of Justice
- In office 16 April 1975 – 25 April 1976
- President: Anwar Sadat
- Prime Minister: Mamdouh Salem
- Succeeded by: Ahmed Talat

Personal details
- Died: 25 April 1976
- Occupation: Jurist

Adel Younis (died 25 April 1976) was an Egyptian jurist. He headed the parquet in Alexandria and served as the deputy head justice of the Court of Cessation in Cairo. Then he was named as the head of the Supreme Court of Appeal in Cairo. In 1969 Younis was removed from the office by President Gamal Abdel Nasser together with other 200 judges due to their alleged apposition to the regime.

Younis was named as the minister of justice on 16 April 1975 to cabinet led by Prime Minister Mamdouh Salem. Younis died on 25 April 1976 while serving in the post. Ahmed Talat succeeded him as minister of justice on 2 May.
