= Hassan Fahmi al-Badawi =

Egyptian politician (1910–1987)

- حسن فهمي البدوي

Minister of Justice
- In office 18 November 1970 – 12 September 1971
- President: Anwar Sadat
- Prime Minister: Mahmoud Fawzi
- Preceded by: Mostafa Kamel Ismail
- Succeeded by: Mohamed Salama

Personal details
- Born: Hassan Fahmi al-Badawi; September 7, 1910 Cairo, Egypt
- Died: July 9, 1987 (aged 76) Cairo, Egypt
- Education: Cairo University

Hassan Fahmi al-Badawi (Arabic: حسن فهمي البدوي), (7 September 1910 – 9 July 1987) was an Egyptian judge and political figure who was Justice Minister, from 1970–1971.

== Early life ==
Hassan Fahmi al-Badawi was born in Giza Governorate in Egypt on 7 September 1910.

He was enrolled in the al-Saidia school and then attended the Faculty of Law at Cairo University.

== Career ==
Hassan Fahmi al-Badawi joined the judiciary upon graduation and was eventually appointed to the head of the Court of Cassation. He was also the presiding judge in the trial of the Champagne Spy Wolfgang Lotz in 1965.

He was appointed Justice Minister of Egypt in the second and third cabinets of Mahmoud Fawzi during the presidency of Anwar Sadat from 18 November 1970 to 12 September 1971.

== Family ==
Hassan Fahmi al-Badawi was married to Soad Salem el-Sayed niece of Ahmed Lutfi el-Sayed.

Political offices
Preceded by Mostafa Kamel Ismail	Justice Minister of Egypt; 1970 – 1971	Succeeded by Mohamed Salama
