= Muslim Youth uprising =

The Muslim Youth uprising is the official name given to an unsuccessful "Islamic revolution" that was set to take place in Egypt on November 28, 2014. The Salafist Front, an Islamist organization which is part of the now banned Muslim Brotherhood-led Anti-Coup Alliance, had initially planned for the uprising earlier in November. The protests' main goal was to establish the "Islamic identity" in Egypt, which they claim to have been hijacked by "secular conspiracies".

== Security response ==
On November 25, Egypt's interior minister, Mohamed Ibrahim, vowed to use lethal force against any attempts to assault public facilities. He said that his forces would use "all means" necessary to fight "terrorist factions". The same day, Ibrahim held a meeting with heads of different police departments and security directors of Greater Cairo to discuss plans to counter any anticipated acts of violence. The meeting also included other government departments such as communications, information technology and transportation.

Security officials have been mainly worried that the supposed protests would be used as a cover by the insurgent group Ansar Bayt al-Maqdis, which recently pledged allegiance to the Islamic State of Iraq and the Levant, to carry out bombings and attacks on this day.

== Attacks ==
Two senior army officers were killed, including a brigadier-general who was killed in a drive-by shooting in Abu Zaabal. Two army conscripts were also injured.
