= Ahmed El-Zend =

Egyptian jurist (1946–2026)

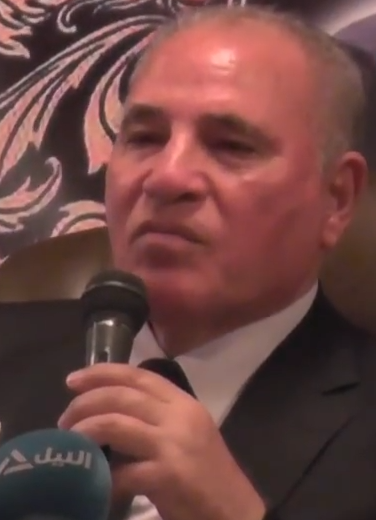
Ahmed El-Zend in 2014

Ahmed El-Zend (Arabic: أحمد الزند; 1946 – 26 September 2026) was an Egyptian jurist who was a Judge at the Egyptian Ministry of Justice and was appointed to be the Minister of Justice in Egypt on 20 May 2015. He was dismissed from the post on 13 March 2016 following criticism from international organizations of using his official role of administering justice to serve dictatorship.

== Life and career ==
El-Zend was born in Tanta in 1946. He became a public prosecutor after graduating obtaining a degree in Islamic law from Al-Azhar University, Faculty of Sharia and Law in 1970. His Honor was elected to be the chief of the Egyptian Judges' Club in 2009 and had occupied this position until he became the Egyptian Minister of Justice.

El-Zend died on 26 September 2026, at the age of 80.
