= Amr Khaled =

Egyptian television preacher (born 1967)

Amr Khaled عمرو خالد
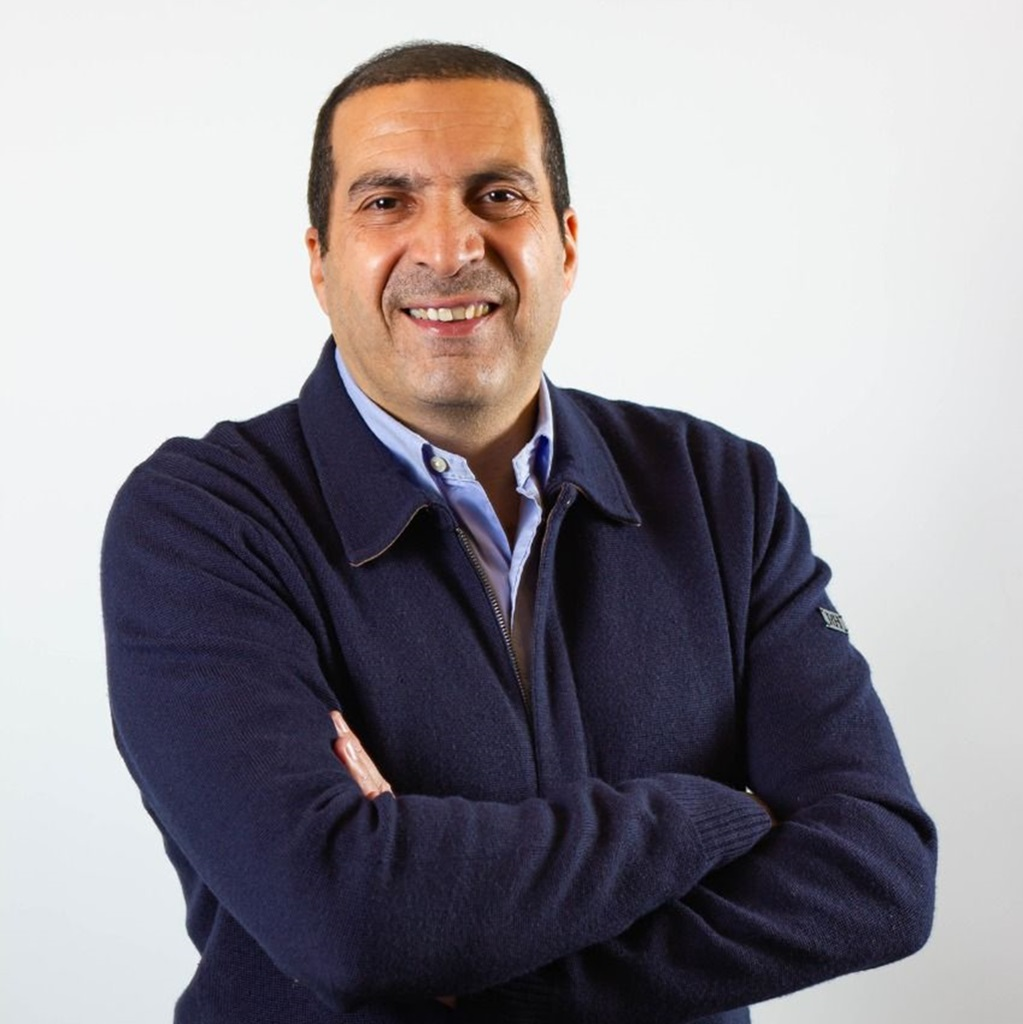
- Born: 5 September 1967 (age 58); Alexandria, Egypt
- Occupation: Muslim preacher

YouTube information
- Channel: Amr Khaled
- Years active: 2007–present
- Subscribers: 2.73 million
- Views: 507 million
- Last updated: 12 August 2026

Amr Mohamed Helmi Khaled (Arabic: عمرو محمد حلمي خالد; born: 5 September 1967) is an Egyptian Muslim activist and television preacher. The New York Times Magazine, in reference to Khaled's popularity in English-speaking countries, described him in 2006 issue as "the world's most famous and influential Muslim television preacher." In 2007, Amr Khaled was chosen as one of the world's 100 most influential people by Time magazine. His message appeals to a large number of Muslims who want an easy way to understand Islam.

== Early days ==
Amr Khaled was born in Alexandria, Egypt, on 5 September 1967. He graduated from Cairo University in 1988 with a degree in accounting. In 2001, he received a diploma from an Islamic studies institute. He received his Ph.D. at the University of Wales, Lampeter, in May 2010 with a grade of A. He began preaching in mosques in 1990 while still working as an accountant. In 1998, he moved to full-time preaching, primarily on satellite television. Khaled's popular lectures, which can be seen on the Iqraa TV channel via the Nilesat direct broadcast satellites, are also distributed over the Internet and on audio and video cassette tapes.

== Ministry and audience ==
Amr Khaled rejects extremism and strongly denounces the actions of Osama bin Laden. He announced that Arab Muslims want to live peacefully in coexistence with the West. His main teachings remain the same as those before him in more modern media, talking about everyday actions to get closer to Allah such as honesty, humbleness, and being polite. He believes that for society to improve it must change from the grassroots (from the bottom up). Khaled promotes community development in the Arabic and Muslim nation based on what he terms "Faith Based Development" (Arabic: التنمية بالإيمان). The idea is for people to develop their communities and countries with faith as their motivator and guide.

Khaled's primary audience consists of Arabs ages fifteen through thirty-five. Khaled believes these are the ones most capable of changing the Islamic world. He is noted for his natural everyday language and his friendly approach, even joking at times during his lectures.

In 2008, in an open online poll, Khaled was voted the 6th topmost intellectual person in the world on the list of top 100 public intellectuals by Prospect magazine (UK) and Foreign Policy (United States).

== Shows ==
Khaled has many shows which were aired on TV in the holy month of Ramadan:

- Call for Coexistence (Arabic: دعوة للتعايش) in 2007.
- Life Makers (Arabic: صناع الحياة) aired from 2004 to 2005.
- On the Path of the Beloved (Arabic: على خطى الحبيب) for Ramadan in 2005 in which he discussed the hagiography (sira) of Muhammad.
- In Thy Name We Live (Arabic: باسمك نحيا) for 2006, aired live at 7:30 GMT every night from Mecca in Saudi Arabia, about the names of God in the Qur'an.
- Qur'an Stories (Arabic: قصص القرآن) for 2008.
- Tomorrow is Better (Arabic: بكرا أحلى) for 2011. In this show he is on the streets of Cairo.
- Journey to Happiness (Arabic: رحلة للسعادة) for 2011.
- Omar: The Maker of Civilization (Arabic: عمر صانع حضارة) for 2012. He spoke about the second caliph, Umar ibn Al-Khattab.
- Qisat Al Andalus "The Story of Andalusia"

In December 2010, Khaled was invited by Yemeni president Ali Abdullah Saleh to preach and broadcast in Yemen, to counter the growth of Al-Qaeda and other extremist groups in the country causing chronic instability there.

== Criticism ==
Critics have called his approach "air-conditioned Islam", where hijab is a fashion purchase and televangelists talk about personal success and getting rich, more akin to Joel Osteen and Billy Graham than traditional Islam. Many scholars, including Yusuf al-Qaradawi, have questioned whether he possesses appropriate qualifications to be a preacher.

The British Sunday Times reported on 30 May 2004, that Andrew Turnbull, the cabinet secretary and one of Tony Blair's closest aides, intended to seek Amr Khaled's aid in furthering the British government's agenda regarding Muslims. He is also criticized for the significant amount of money he makes from his television shows. His annual income in 2007 is estimated to be $2,500,000.

== Politics ==
After the 25 January 2011 revolution in Egypt, Amr Khaled shared in establishing a political party called the Egypt Party and was elected as its president; however, he resigned one day after the 2013 Egyptian coup d'état. Following the coup, he supported Egyptian President Abdel Fattah el-Sisi as a beacon of stability.

== Bibliography ==
Books by Amr Khaled include:

- Rafi Barakat, 2014 novel. ISBN 978-9771451815

== See also ==
- Tareq Al-Suwaidan
- Moez Masoud
