= Adel Labib =

Egyptian politician

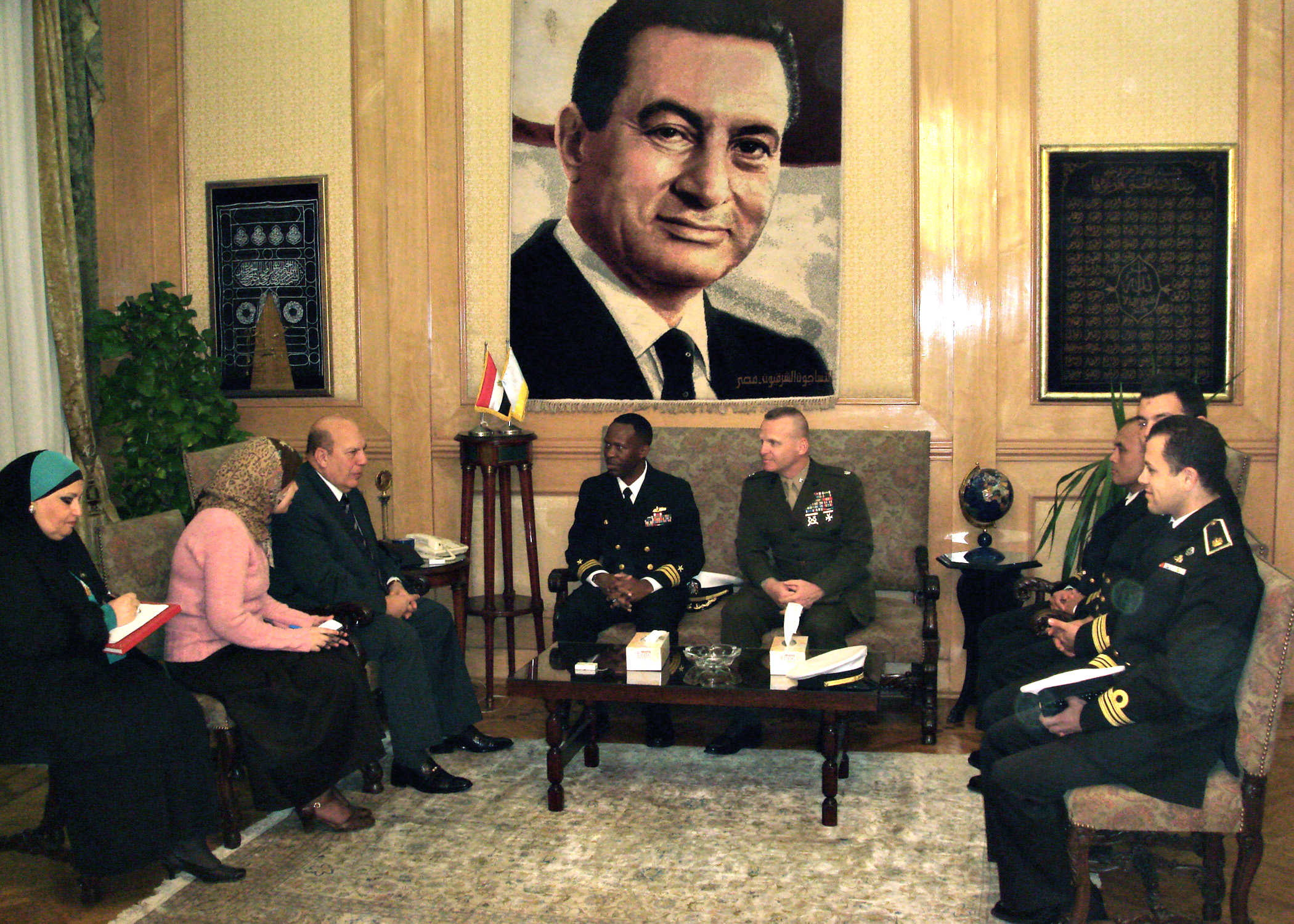

Minister of Local Development
- Incumbent
- Assumed office 16 July 2013
- President: Adly Mansour
- Prime Minister: Hazem Al Beblawi; Ibrahim Mahlab

Adel Labib (Arabic: عادل لبيب) is the former governor of Alexandria, and Beheira Governorate, and the current governor of Qena Governorate since 4 August 2011. He was appointed as the minister of local development in the interim government of Egypt. He was later removed as Minister of Local Development in 2015.

== See also ==
- Timeline of Alexandria, 2000s
