= Laila Iskander =

Egyptian social entrepreneur

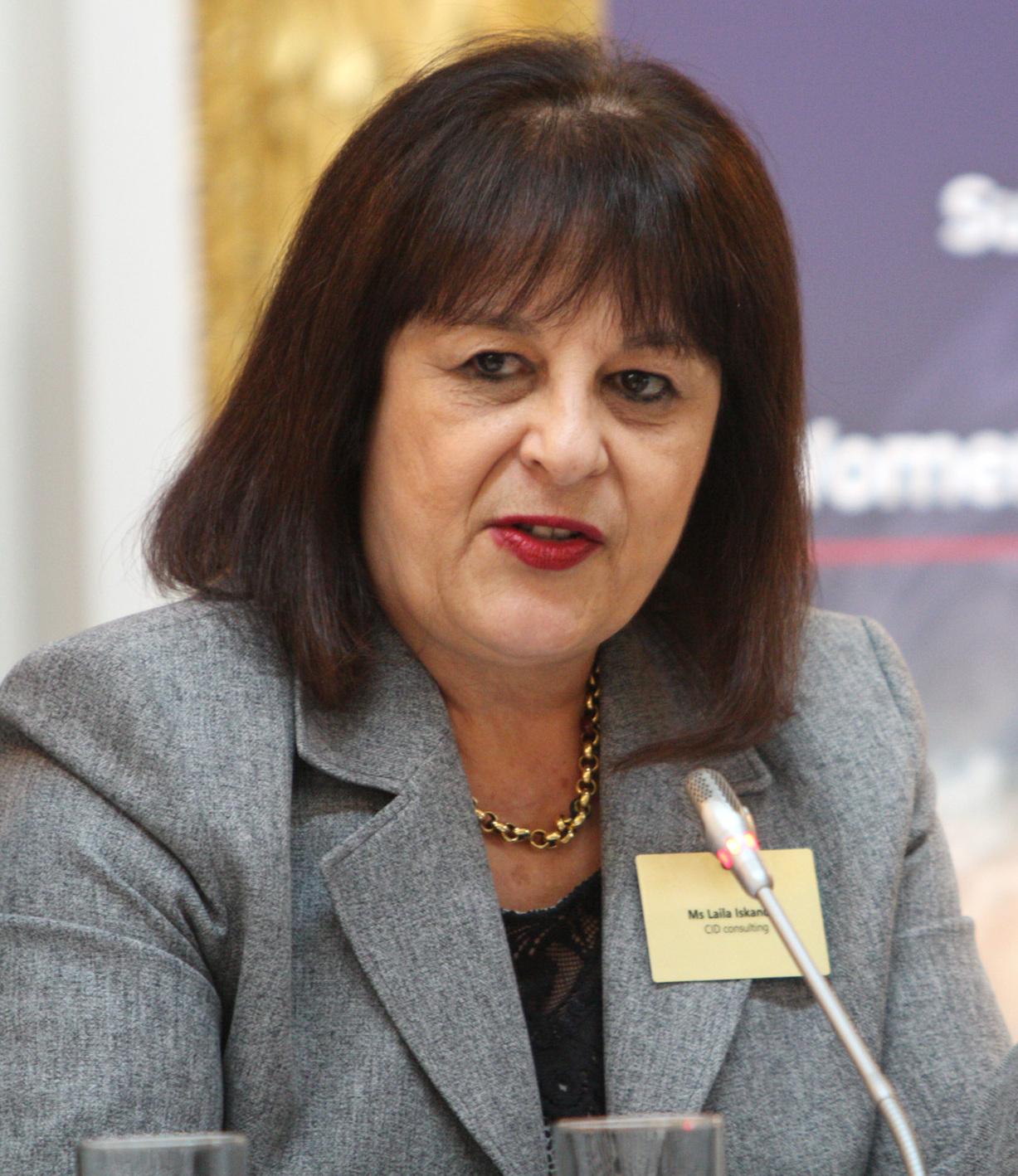

Minister of Urban Development
- In office 17 June 2014 – 19 September 2015
- President: Abdel Fattah el-Sisi
- Prime Minister: Ibrahim Mahlab
- Preceded by: N.A.

Minister of Environment
- Succeeded by: Khaled Fahmy

Laila Rashed Iskander Kamel (Arabic: ليلى راشد إسكندر, romanized: Laylá Rāshid Iskandar) is an Egyptian social entrepreneur and politician. She is formerly Egypt's Minister of State for Environment Affairs in the interim government of Prime Minister Hazem El Beblawi.

Dr. Iskander has been working with Egyptian grassroots organizations for over 20 years. She acts as chairperson and founding board member of CID Consulting – an Egyptian consulting firm that "strives to create holistic growth solutions by bridging corporate and developmental objectives". She is well recognized internationally and locally as a consultant, researcher, and trainer in community development. Laila Iskander is also a trustee at Alfanar, the first venture philanthropy organization in the Arab Region.

== Education and early career ==
Dr. Iskander studied Economics, Political Science and Business at Cairo University. She acquired a Master of Arts in Teaching with a specialization in Near Eastern Studies from the University of California, Berkeley and later acquired a Doctorate of Education from the Teacher's College at Columbia University in New York.

Iskander has worked as researcher, speaker and consultant with governmental and international agencies as well as with the private sector in the fields of gender, education and development, environment, child labor and governance. Her consultation work encompasses grass roots' issues and policy matters. She also served as consultant to the Egyptian Minister of Environment on waste management.

Over the past 25 years, Iskander has worked on projects in “…institutional building, network creation, institution of public-private partnerships, and technology transfer…” in the fields of non-formal education, primary health care, community environmental issues, crafts, literacy and gender, among others. She also served as a jury member to UNESCO's International Literacy Prize and acted as UNESCO's UNLD Resource Person for the Arab region between 2005 and 2007.

Dr. Laila also has a long track record and expertise in the area of formal and non-formal education techniques, and had managed several projects in this area in Egypt

== Networks ==
In 2026, Dr. Iskander was elected by the General Assembly of the Association of Upper Egypt for Education and Development as Chairwoman.

Iskander sits on the Board of Trustees of the International Institute for Environment and Development.

She is also member of the executive team of collaborative working group on solid waste management in low- and middle-income countries, better known as CWG – an informal knowledge network that brings together volunteers to share knowledge on solid waste management methods in developing countries.

== Social entrepreneurship ==
On being a social entrepreneur, Iskandar stated that:

The term 'social entrepreneur', I think, requires re-visiting. I would like to advise anyone embarking on a career or a changing path to look at business as an enterprise that must include people’s well-being all around. Not just me and my company or my NGO and the money we’re gonna make. So enterprises must be fair, equitable, just...my advice is that for us to challenge the definitions of what entrepreneurship is, what profit is. I must not just look at the money at the end of my annual statement. I must look at the well-being of everybody around me because we live in one planet...and if we continue to look at grabbing things and doing well by ourselves, it’s not going to be sustainable...You must examine the whole concept of business and profit from an angle that says: if it’s not social, then it’s bad business.

— Laila Iskander, Interview with Global X

== Authorship ==
Dr. Iskander acted as Director and Lead Author of the Business Solutions for Human Development Report 2007 on Egypt. In 1994, she authored a book titled Mokattam garbage village, Cairo, Egypt.

== Notable contributions ==
=== Mokattam Recycling School ===
Dr. Iskander's contributions include her notable work with the zabbaleen or garbage collectors, in Egypt, where she established an informal recycling school in 1982 to teach children basic literacy, health and hygiene - a project for which she received the Goldman Environmental Prize in 1994.

Her work with the garbage collectors includes a "learning and earning" rug-weaving program ("Kamel’s Rug-Weaving Center"), in which girls from the zabbaleen community weave rugs on a hand-loom using discarded cotton. The project integrated an educational program to teach the girls basic math and literacy and facilitated the sale of their rugs at handicraft fairs for profit.

=== Sinai Recycling Project ===
The know-how of waste management in Manshiyat Naser on the outskirts of Cairo was transferred to the Egyptian tourist towns of Dahab and Nuweiba in 1997, when Kamel cooperated with social entrepreneur Sherif El-Ghamrawy – eco-lodge owner and founder of environmental protection organization "Hemaya" (Arabic for "Protection"). The project involved separating and dividing organic and non-organic waste and delivering non-organic waste to a sorting and processing transfer station to be re-used and recycled; organic waste was delivered to Sinai Bedouin who used it to feed their cattle, thus preventing environmental degradation caused by unorganized waste disposal methods.

The processing transfer station was established to absorb the large volume of alcohol bottles, plastic, cardboard and other recyclable materials from tourism establishments and provide a healthy source of income from the re-sale of plastics and glass both locally and internationally.

== Awards ==
In 1994, Dr. Iskander received the Goldman Environmental Prize for her early work with the zabbaleen

At the World Economic Forum in Sharm el-Sheikh in 2006, she and her organization – CID Consulting – received the Schwab Award for Social Entrepreneurship for their design and implementation of a "learning and earning" project for children of the zaballeen with fast-moving consumer goods Procter & Gamble Egypt.

== Personal life ==
Iskander is a Christian.
