= Hani Qadri Demian =

Egyptian politician

Hani Qadri Demian is an Egyptian civil servant who served as the Egypt's minister of finance to which he was first appointed in February 2014. The cabinet was led by Prime Minister Ibrahim Mahlab. Before serving in the post Demian was working at the finance ministry as the assistant to the minister. His term ended in 2016.
