= Ministry of Justice (Egypt) =

Government ministry of Egypt

Arab Republic of Egypt Ministry of Justice
- Emblem of Egypt

- Ministry headquarters

Agency overview
- Jurisdiction: Government of Egypt
- Headquarters: The New Capital
- Agency executive: Mohamed Hossam Abdel-Rahim, Minister

The Ministry of Justice is the justice ministry of the government of Egypt. Its headquarters are in The New Capital.

== History ==
Before the governorship of Egypt was assigned to Muhammad Ali Pasha in 1805, the Ottoman Sultan in Istanbul sent 24 Beys to the Turkish governor in Egypt to oversee major affairs in Egypt. During the reign of Muhammad Ali Pasha, the (Diwan/Office of the Governor or Khedive) was established. Its powers combined legislative, executive, and judicial authority.

It was entrusted with maintaining public order in the city, enacting regulations and laws, and adjudicating disputes between citizens and foreigners alike, particularly in matters related to inheritance and major crimes. During the reign of Khedive Ismail, the Ministry of Justice (then called the Supervision of Justice) was established in 1878 pursuant to a Khedive's high decree issued in August 1878. This resulted from a change in the litigation system and an attempt to reorganize the judiciary, transforming it from the Justice Courts to the Mixed Courts, which were established in 1875.

Approximately 26 Supervisions served in the Ministry of Justice from its inception until 1914, when the names of the Supervisions were changed to Ministries.

== Profile ==
On 17 June 2014, Mahfouz Saber was appointed minister of justice.

On 20 May 2015, Ahmed El-Zend was appointed minister of justice and was reappointed on 19 September 2015, but on 14 March 2016, he was removed from his post by Egyptian Prime Minister, Sherif Ismail, for making controversial comments. Later that month, on 23 March, Mohamed Hossam Abdel Rahim was named minister of justice.

== List of ministers ==
- Mohammed Sabri Abu Alam (1942–1944)
- Mohamed Ali Rushdie (1952)
- Ahmed Hosni (1952–1961)
- Nihad Al-Qasim (1961)
- Fathi Al-Sharqawi (1961–1964)
- Badawi Ibrahim Hamouda (1964–1965)
- Essam El Din Hassouna (1965–1968)
- Mohamed Abu Nusair (1968–1969)
- Mustafa Kamel Ismail (1969–1970)
- Hassan Fahmi al-Badawi (1970–1971)
- Mohamed Mohamed Salama (1971–1973)
- Fakhri Mohamed Abdel Nabi (1973–1974)
- Mustafa Fahmi Abu Zeid (1974–1975)
- Adel Younis (1975–1976)
- Ahmed Talaat (1976–1978)
- Ahmed Mamdouh Attia (1978)
- Ahmed Ali Moussa (1978–1979)
- Anwar Abdel Fattah Abu Sahli (1979–1981)
- Ahmed Sameer Sami (1981–1982)
- Ahmed Mamdouh Attia (1982–1987)
- Farouk Seif Al Nasr (1987–2004)
- Mahmoud Abul Leil (2004–2006)
- Mamdouh Marei (2006–2011)
- Mohamed Abdel Aziz Al Jundi (2011)
- Adel Abdul Hamid (2011–2012)
- Ahmed Mekki (2012–2013)
- Ahmed Suleiman (2013)
- Adel Abdel Hamid (2013–2014)
- Nair Othman (2014)
- Mahfouz Saber (2014–2015)
- Ahmed Al Zind (2015–2016)
- Mohamed Hossam (2016–2018 or 2019)
- Omar Marawan (2018 or 2019–2026)
- Mahmoud El-Sherif (2026–present)

== See also ==
- Cabinet of Egypt
- Justice ministry
- Politics of Egypt
