= Egypt Party =

Political party in Egypt

Egypt Party حزب مصر
- Leader: Nabil Azmy
- Founded: 21 September 2012
- Ideology: Moderate Islamism
- Political position: Centre
- House of Representatives: 0 / 568

Website
- http://www.misrparty.com/arabic/

The Egypt Party is a political party started by Muslim preacher Amr Khaled. He stepped down as party head in July 2013. The former interim Minister of State for Youth, Khaled Abdel-Aziz, is a member of the Egypt Party.
