= Assiut University =

Public university in Egypt

Coordinates: 27°11′16″N 31°10′13″E

- جامعة أسيوط
- Type: Public University
- Established: 1957
- President: Ahmed El-Minshawy
- Faculty: 4,450
- Undergraduates: 75,000
- Postgraduates: 18,000
- Location: Assiut, Egypt
- Website: http://www.aun.edu.eg

University rankings

Global – Overall
- QS World: 1001–1200 (2026)
- THE World: 1201–1500 (2024)
- USNWR Global: =710 (2023)

Assiut University is a university located in Assiut, Egypt. It was established in October 1957 as the first university in Upper Egypt.

== Statistics ==
- Faculty members: 2,442
- Assistant lecturers and demonstrators: 1,432
- Administrative staff: 11,686
- Other service assistants: 3,815

== Faculties and institutes ==
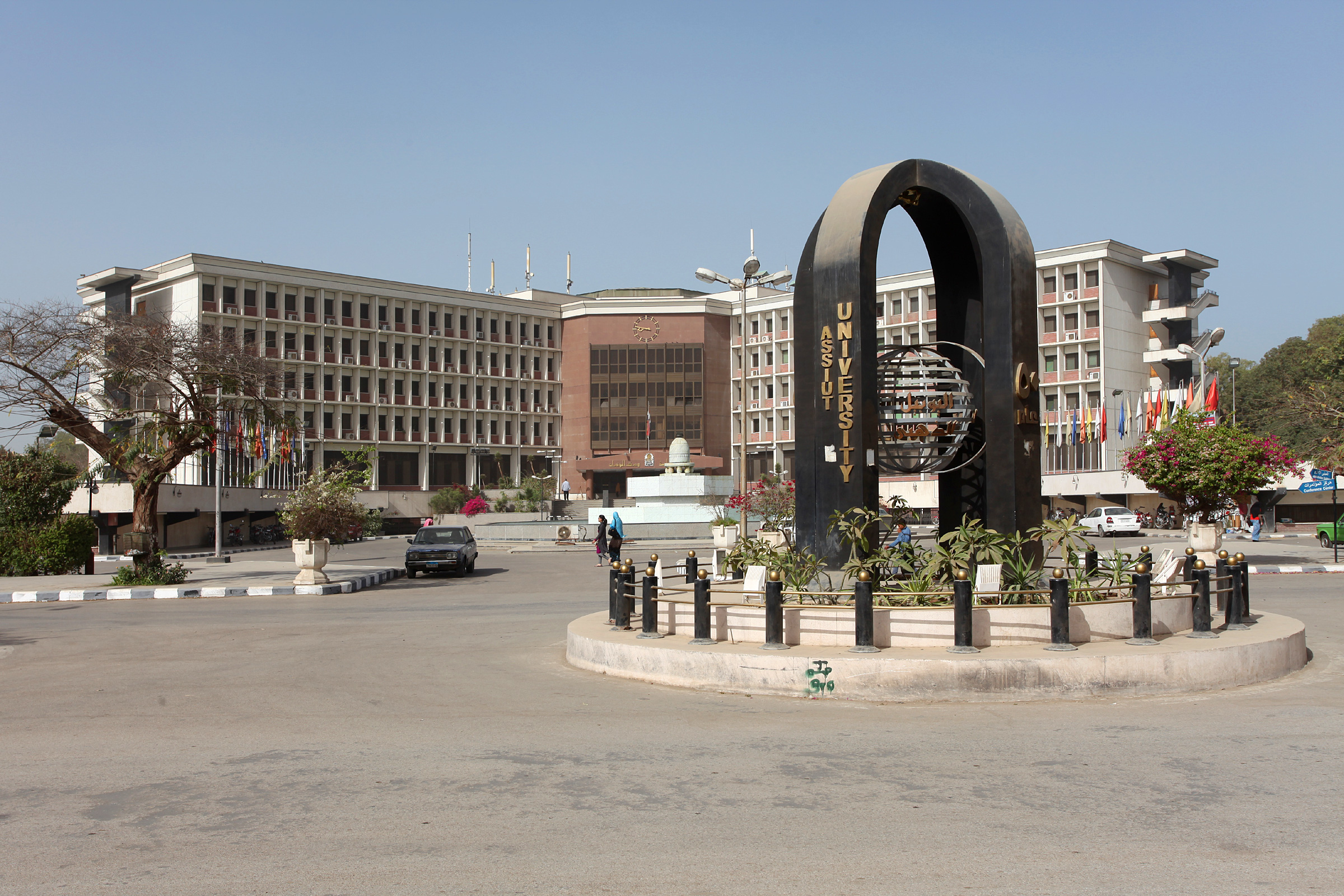
Campus in Assiut City.

The university includes 16 faculties and three institutes.

- Faculty of Science
- Faculty of Engineering
- Faculty of Agriculture
- Faculty of Medicine
- Faculty of Pharmacy
- Faculty of Veterinary Medicine
- Faculty of Commerce
- Faculty of Education
- Faculty of Law
- Faculty of Physical Education
- Faculty of Nursing
- Faculty of Specific Education
- Faculty of Education (New Valley Regional Campus)
- Faculty of Social Work
- Faculty of Arts
- Faculty of Computers and Information
- Faculty of dentistry
- Faculty of Sugar and Integrated Industries Technology
- South Egypt Cancer Institute (SECI)
- Technical Institute of Nursing
- Faculty of Agriculture (New Valley Branch)

== Notable alumni ==
- Ibrahim Deif
- Gamal Helal
- Shukri Mustafa
- Mustapha Bakri
- Abdel Nasser Tawfik

== See also ==
- List of universities in Egypt
- Education in Egypt
