= Sherif Ismail =

Prime Minister of Egypt from 2015 to 2018

- شريف إسماعيل
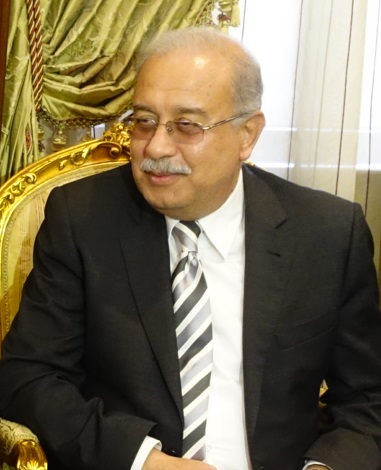
- Ismail in 2016

53rd Prime Minister of Egypt
- In office 19 September 2015 – 7 June 2018
- President: Abdel Fattah el-Sisi
- Preceded by: Ibrahim Mahlab
- Succeeded by: Mostafa Madbouly

Minister of Petroleum
- In office 16 July 2013 – 12 September 2015
- Prime Minister: Hazem El Beblawi (acting); Ibrahim Mahlab
- Preceded by: Sherif Haddara
- Succeeded by: Tareq el Molla

Personal details
- Born: 6 July 1955
- Died: 4 February 2023 (aged 67) Cairo, Egypt
- Party: Independent
- Education: Ain Shams University

Sherif Ismail (Arabic: شريف إسماعيل, romanized: Šarīf ʾIsmāʿīl, pronounced [ʃɪˈɾiːf esmæˈʕiːl]; 6 July 1955 – 4 February 2023) was an Egyptian engineer and politician who served as the 53rd prime minister of Egypt from 2015 to 2018. He was also the minister of petroleum and mineral resources from 2013 to 2015.

== Early life and education ==
Ismail was born on 6 July 1955. He studied mechanical engineering at Ain Shams University and graduated in 1978.

== Career ==
Ismail held managerial posts at state-run petrochemical and natural gas firms. He served as the executive deputy chairman and then chairman of the Egyptian holding company for petrochemicals (ECHEM), which was established in 2002. Next he was named chairman of the Egyptian Natural Gas Holding Company (EGAS).

Then he worked as the managing director of the state-run oil holding company, Ganoub El Wadi Petroleum Holding Company (GANOPE), and became chairman of the company. He was appointed minister of petroleum and mineral resources on 16 July 2013 as part of the interim cabinet led by Hazem El Beblawi. He replaced Sherif Hassan Haddara in the post. Ismail was appointed prime minister on 12 September 2015. In 2016 an economic crisis occurred when the Egyptian pound significantly weakened. Due to this crisis, the cabinet of Ismail had to initiate and implement the strict economic reforms. Following this incident Ismail reshuffled the cabinet in March 2016 changing ten ministers, including finance, investment, and tourism ministers. In February 2017, the cabinet was again reshuffled, which included the change of nine ministers mostly related to economic policies. In November 2017 Ismail left Egypt for treatment in Germany and resumed his post on 1 December. During this period Mostafa Madbouly, minister of housing and urban utilities, served as the acting prime minister.

On 5 June 2018, Ismail submitted his resignation to Egyptian President Abdel Fattah el-Sisi. However, he continued to serve as prime minister in caretaker capacity. Two days after Ismail submitted his resignation, Sisi appointed Madbouly to succeed him as prime minister.

Following his departure as prime minister, it was reported on 9 June 2018 that Ismail had been nominated to serve as the top aide to Sisi. From 18 June Ismail served as presidential aide for national and strategic projects and represented Sisi at the funeral of Jacques Chirac in September 2019.

== Personal life and death ==
Ismail was married and had two children. He had health problems related to the digestive system and had an operation in Germany in November 2017 while serving as prime minister. He died in Cairo on 4 February 2023, at the age of 67. His death was first announced by the Egyptian President Sisi via a post on social media.

A military funeral ceremony was held for Ismail on 5 February, and the funeral prayers took place at the Lt. Gen. Hussein Tantawi Mosque in New Cairo with the attendance of the President Sisi, Prime Minister Mostafa Madbouly, Speaker of the House of Representatives Hanfy Gebaly and Defense Minister Mohamed Ahmed Zaki along with others.

Political offices
Preceded by Ibrahim Mahlab	Prime Minister of Egypt; 2015–2018	Succeeded by Mostafa Madbouly
