= Ibrahim Mahlab =

Egyptian engineer and politician (born 1949)

- إبراهيم محلب
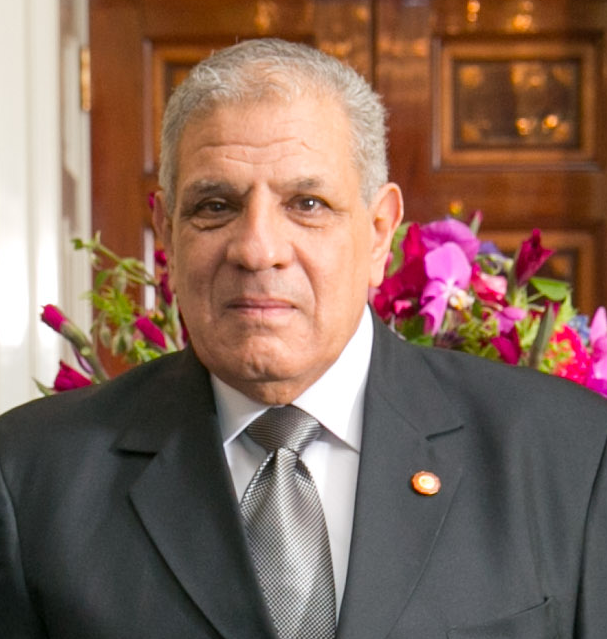
- Mahlab in 2014

52nd Prime Minister of Egypt
- In office 17 June 2014 – 19 September 2015; Acting : 1 March 2014 – 17 June 2014
- President: Adly Mansour (interim); Abdel Fattah el-Sisi
- Preceded by: Hazem El Beblawi (acting)
- Succeeded by: Sherif Ismail

Minister of Housing
- In office 16 July 2013 – 1 March 2014
- Prime Minister: Hazem El Beblawi (acting)
- Preceded by: Tarek Wafik
- Succeeded by: Mostafa Madbouly

Personal details
- Born: Ibrahim Roshdy Mahlab; 8 May 1949 (age 77) Cairo, Egypt
- Party: National Democratic Party (Before 2011); Independent (2011–present)
- Education: Cairo University

Ibrahim Roshdy Mahlab (Arabic: إبراهيم رشدي محلب, pronounced [ebɾɑˈhiːm ˈɾoʃdi ˈmæħlæb]; born 8 May 1949) is an Egyptian engineer and politician who served as the 52nd prime minister of Egypt from 1 March 2014 until 19 September 2015. Previously he served as Minister of Housing.

== Career ==
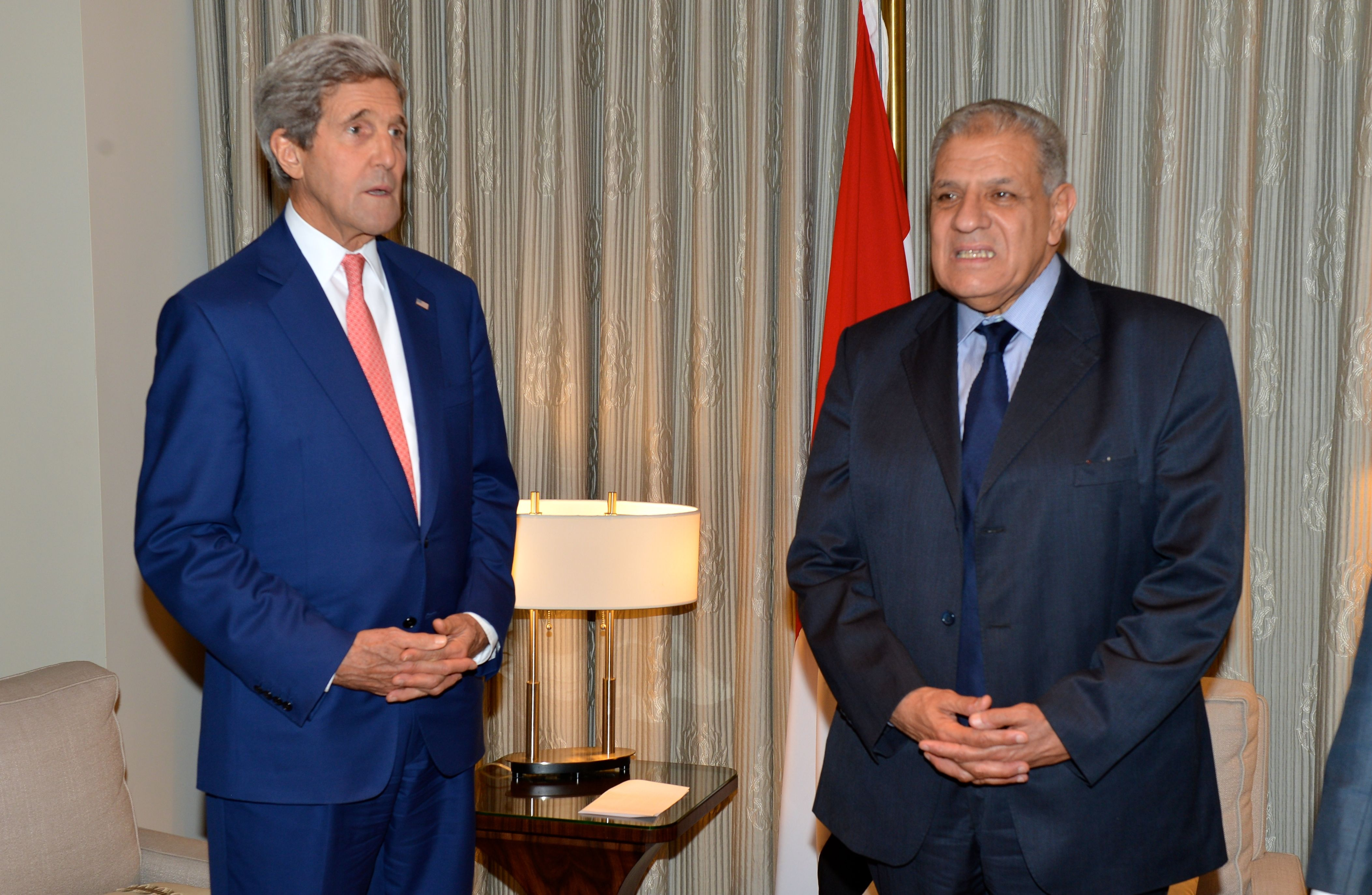
Mahlab meets with U.S. Secretary of State John Kerry in Washington, D.C., 4 August 2014

Mahlab joined the Arab Contractors Company as an engineer early in his career, making his way up through the ranks until becoming deputy CEO in the 1990s, and CEO in 2001.

Mahlab was an appointed member of the short-lived 2010 Shura Council (Parliament Upper House) by president Hosni Mubarak, as well as a member of the Policies Committee of Mubarak's National Democratic Party prior to the 2011 Egyptian revolution.

Mahalab resigned as CEO of Arab Contractors in 2012. Following the 2013 Egyptian coup d'etat, Hazem el-Beblawi was made interim Prime Minister and Mahlab was appointed as Minister of Housing. Following the surprise resignation of el-Beblawi's government, Mahlab was tasked with forming an interim government. He said that his administration would "work together to restore security and safety to Egypt and crush terrorism in all corners of the country." He also vowed to rebuild the economy. The day after being sworn in he said that security is the main issue and called for a halt to protests and strikes.

While as Prime Minister he worked with high up officials of the Egyptian Coptic Church, including Pop Tawadros II.

He was reappointed on 17 June 2014 and resigned on 12 September 2015, though the cabinet remained in their posts until a new government was formed.

== Personal life ==
Mahlab is married and speaks Arabic, English, French, and Portuguese.

Political offices
Preceded by Hazem Al Beblawi	Prime Minister of Egypt; 2014–2015	Succeeded by Sherif Ismail
Preceded by Tarek Wafik	Minister of Housing; 2013–2014	Succeeded by Mostafa Madbouly
