= Sharaf Cabinet =

Egyptian governing cabinet

- Cabinet of Egypt

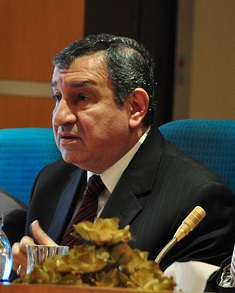
- Date formed: 3 March 2011
- Date dissolved: 21 November 2011

People and organisations
- Head of state: Mohamed Hussein Tantawi
- Head of government: Essam Sharaf

History
- Predecessor: Shafik Cabinet
- Successor: Second Ganzouri Cabinet

The Sharaf Cabinet was the cabinet of Egypt which was led by prime minister Essam Sharaf from 3 March 2011 to 21 November 2011. It was an interim cabinet and reshuffled in July 2011.

== List of members ==
Office	Member	Term	Reference
Prime Minister	Kamal Ganzouri	2011 – 7 December 2011	
Prime Minister	Essam Sharaf	2011 – 24 November 2011	
Vice Prime Minister	Yehia El-Gamal	2011 – 12 July 2011	
Vice Prime Minister for Political Development and Democratic Transition	Ali El Selmi	July 2011–December 2011	
Vice Prime Minister for Economic Affairs and Finance Minister	Hazem Al Beblawi	July 2011–November 2011	
Ministry of Agriculture and Land Reclamation	Ayman Farid Abu-Hadid	2011–July 2011	
Ministry of Agriculture and Land Reclamation	Salah Al-Sayed Youssef Farag	July 2011–November 2011	
Minister of State for Antiquities Affairs	Zahi Abbas Abdel Wahab Hawass	March 2011–July 2011	
Ministry of Civil Aviation	Ibrahim Ahmed Mannaa	2011–July 2011	
Ministry of Civil Aviation	Loutfy Moustafa Kamal Mohamed Tawfik	July 2011–November 2011	
Ministry of Communications and Information Technology	Maged Ibrahim Othman	22 February 2011 – July 2011	
Ministry of Communications and Information Technology	Mohamed Abdel Qader Mohamed Salim	July 2011–November 2011	
Ministry of Culture	Emad Badr El-Din Mahmoud Abu Ghazy	2011–November 2011	
Ministry of Education and Higher Education	Ahmed Gamal El-Din Moussa (Ahmed Gamal Eddin Moussa)	2011–November 2011	
Ministry of Electricity and Energy	Hassan Younes	2011–November 2011	
Ministry of State for the Environment Affairs	Maged George Elias Ghattas	2011–November 2011	
Ministry of Finance	Samir Radwan)	2011 – 17 July 2011	
Ministry of Foreign Affairs	Nabil Elaraby)	2011 – 1 June 2011	
Ministry of Foreign Affairs	Ambassador Mohamed Orabi	1 June 2011 – 17 July 2011	
Ministry of Foreign Affairs	Ambassador Mohamed Kamel Ali Amr	17 July 2011 – November 2011	
Ministry of Health and Population	Ashraf Mahmoud Ibrahim Hatem	2011–July 2011	
Ministry of Health and Population	Amr Mohamed Helmy	July 2011–November 2011	
Ministry of Housing, Utilities and Urban Development	Mohamed Fathi al-Baradei)	2011–November 2011	
Ministry of Industry and Foreign Trade	Mahmoud Eisa	21 July 2011 – November 2011	
Ministry of Interior	Mansour Abdel Kerim Moustafa Essawy	2011–November 2011	
Ministry of Justice	Mohamed al-Guindi)	2011–July 2011	
Ministry of Justice	Gouda Abdel Khalek El-Sayed Mohamed	July 2011–November 2011	
Ministry of State for Local Development	Mohsen al-Nomani	2011–July 2011	
Ministry of Manpower and Emigration	Ahmed Hassan El-Boraei	2011–November 2011	
Ministry of State for Military Production	Sayed Meshaal	2011–November 2011	
Ministry of Petroleum and Metallurgical Wealth (Petroleum and Metallurgical Wealth)	Mohamed Ghorab	2011–November 2011	
Ministry of Planning and International Cooperation	Faiza Abu Naga	2011–November 2011	
Ministry of Religious Endowment (Awkaf)	Abdallah al-Husseini)	2011–November 2011	
Ministry of Scientific Research, Science and Technology	Amr Ezzat Salama	2011–November 2011	
Ministry of Social Solidarity and Justice	Gouda Abdel Khaleq	2011–November 2011	
Ministry of Tourism	Mounir Fakhry Abdel Nour	2011	
Ministry of Trade and Industry	Samir Youssef Ali El-Sayyad	2011 – 17 July 2011	
Ministry of Transportation	Atef Abdel Hamid Moustafa	2011–November 2011	
Ministry of Water Resources and Irrigation	Hussien Ehsan Al-Atfy	2011–November 2011	
Acting Minister – Ministry of State for Administrative Development (Egypt)	Ashraf Abdelwahab	2011–November 2011	
Governor – Central Bank of Egypt	Farouk Abd El Baky El Okdah	2011–November 2011	
Minister without portfolio; GID Chief	Murad Muwafi	2011–November 2011	
Chairman of the Suez Canal Authority	Ahmed Ali Fadel	2011–November 2011	
Permanent Representative to the United Nations	Maged A. Abdelaziz	2011–November 2011	
