= Nazif Cabinet =

- Cabinet of Egypt

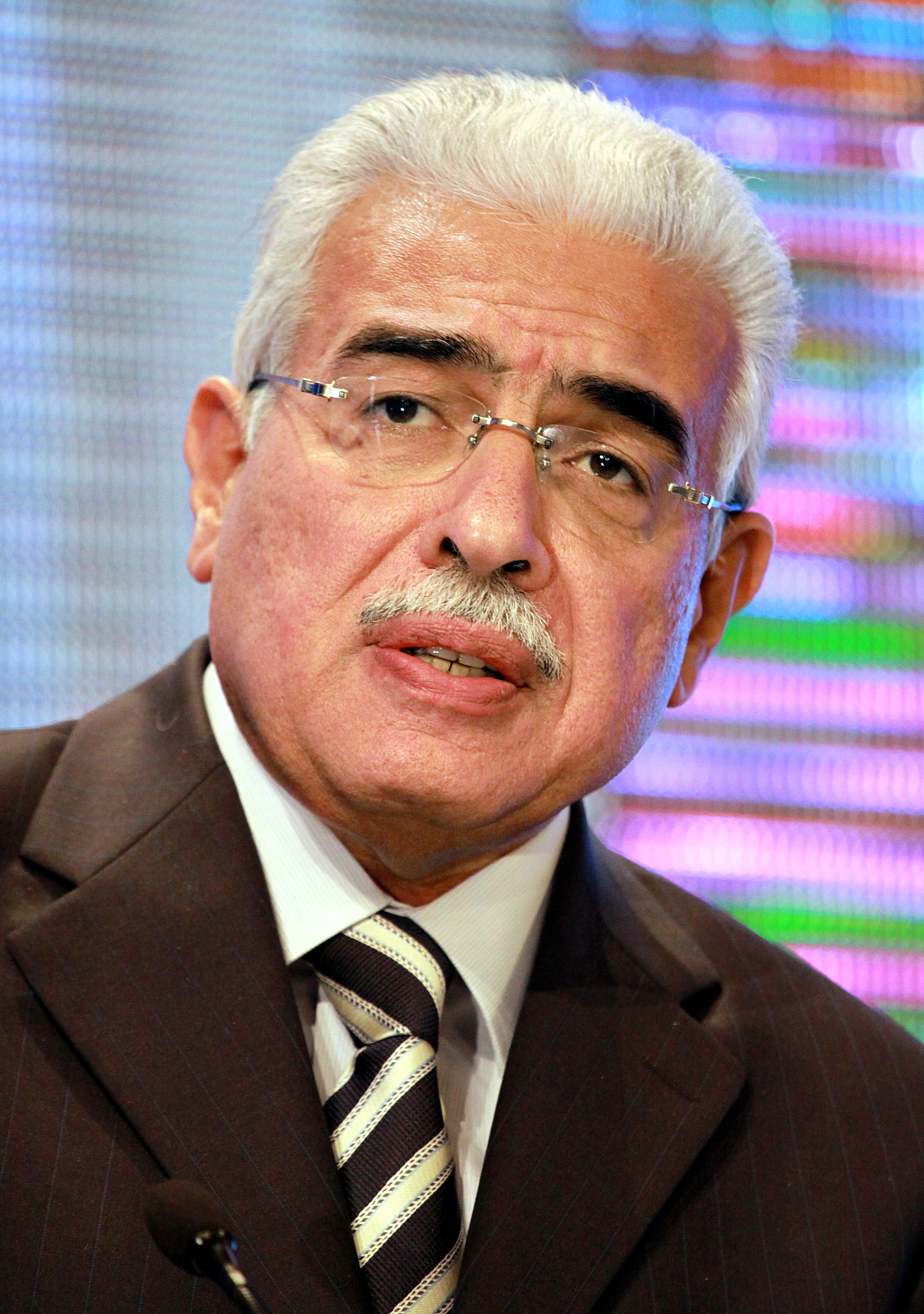
- Date formed: 14 July 2004
- Date dissolved: 31 January 2011

People and organisations
- Head of state: Hosni Mubarak
- Head of government: Ahmed Shafik
- Member party: National Democratic Party
- Status in legislature: Majority government

History
- Election: 2005
- Predecessor: Ebeid Cabinet
- Successor: Shafik Cabinet

The Nazif Cabinet was led by Ahmed Nazif, who served as prime minister of Egypt from 14 July 2004 to 31 January 2011.

== List of ministers ==
Ahmed Nazif Cabinet (2004–2011)
Office	Incumbent	Since
Prime Minister	Ahmed Nazif	2004
Ministry of Agriculture and Land Reclamation	Amin Ahmed Mohamed Othman Abaza	2005
Ministry of Civil Aviation	Ahmed Shafiq	2004
Ministry of Communications and Information Technology (MCIT)	Tarek Kamel	2004
Ministry of Culture	Farouk Hosni	1987
Ministry of Defense and Military Production	Mohamed Hussein Tantawi	1991
Ministry of Education	Ahmed Zaki Badr	2010
Ministry of Electricity and Energy	Hassan Younes	2004
Ministry of Finance	Youssef Boutros-Ghali	2004
Ministry of Foreign Affairs	Ahmed Aboul Gheit	2004
Ministry of Trade and Industry	Rachid Mohamed Rachid	2004
Ministry of Health and Population	Hatem Mostafa El Gabali	2005
Ministry of Higher Education and Scientific Research	Hani Mahfouz Hilal	2005
Ministry of Housing, Utilities, and Urban Communities	Ahmed Alaa E-Din Amin El-Maghrabi	2005
Ministry of Information	Anas El Fiqqi	2004
Ministry of Social Solidarity	Ali El-Sayed Ali Al-Moselhi	2005
Ministry of Interior	Habib El Adly	1997
Ministry of Investment	Mahmoud Mohieldin	2004
Ministry of International Cooperation	Fayza Aboel Naga	2004
Ministry of Justice	Mamdouh Marei	2006
Ministry of Manpower and Immigration	Aisha Abdel Hadi	2005
Ministry of Petroleum	Sameh Fahmi	1999
Ministry of Planning and Economic Development	Osman Mohamed Osman	
Ministry of Local Development	Mohamed Abdul Salam Mahgoub	2006
Ministry of Religious Affairs	Mahmoud Zakzouk	1996
Ministry of Tourism	Mohamed Zohair Garana	2005
Ministry of Transportation	Alaa Edin Mohamed Fahmi	2010
Ministry of Water Resources and Irrigation	Mohamed Nasruddin	2009
Ministry of State for Administrative Development	Ahmed Darwish	2004
Ministry of State for Legal and Parliamentary Councils	Moufed Mahmoud Shehab	2005
Ministry of State for Environmental Affairs	Maged George	2004
Ministry of State for Military Production	Sayed Meshaal	1999
Ministry of State for Family and Population	Moushira Khattab	2009
Governor – Central Bank of Egypt	Farouk Abdel Baky Al Okda	2004
Permanent Representative to the UN, New York	Maged Abdel Fattah	2005
Minister without portfolio; GIS Chief	Omar Suleiman	1993
Chairman of the Suez Canal Authority	Ahmed Ali Fadel	1996
