= Newgiza University =

Private university in Egypt

Coordinates: 30°01′00.3″N 31°03′57.6″E

- جامعة الجيزة الجديدة
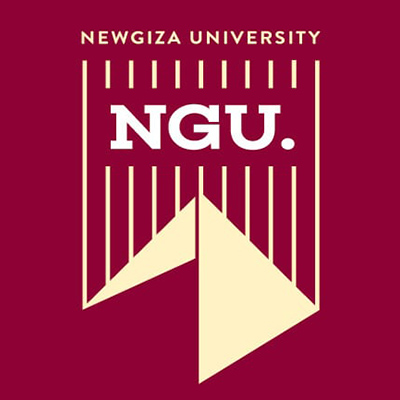
- Motto: Pleasure of Learning
- Type: Private
- Established: 2016
- President: Dr. Ahmed Sameh Farid, Former Minister of Health and Population of Egypt
- Vice-president: Dr. Lamis Raghab
- Location: Km 22 Cairo-Alex Road, Giza, Egypt
- Campus: Urban
- Language: English
- Academic Collaborations: University College London (UCL) & Milano Fashion Institute
- Colors
- Website: ngu.edu.eg

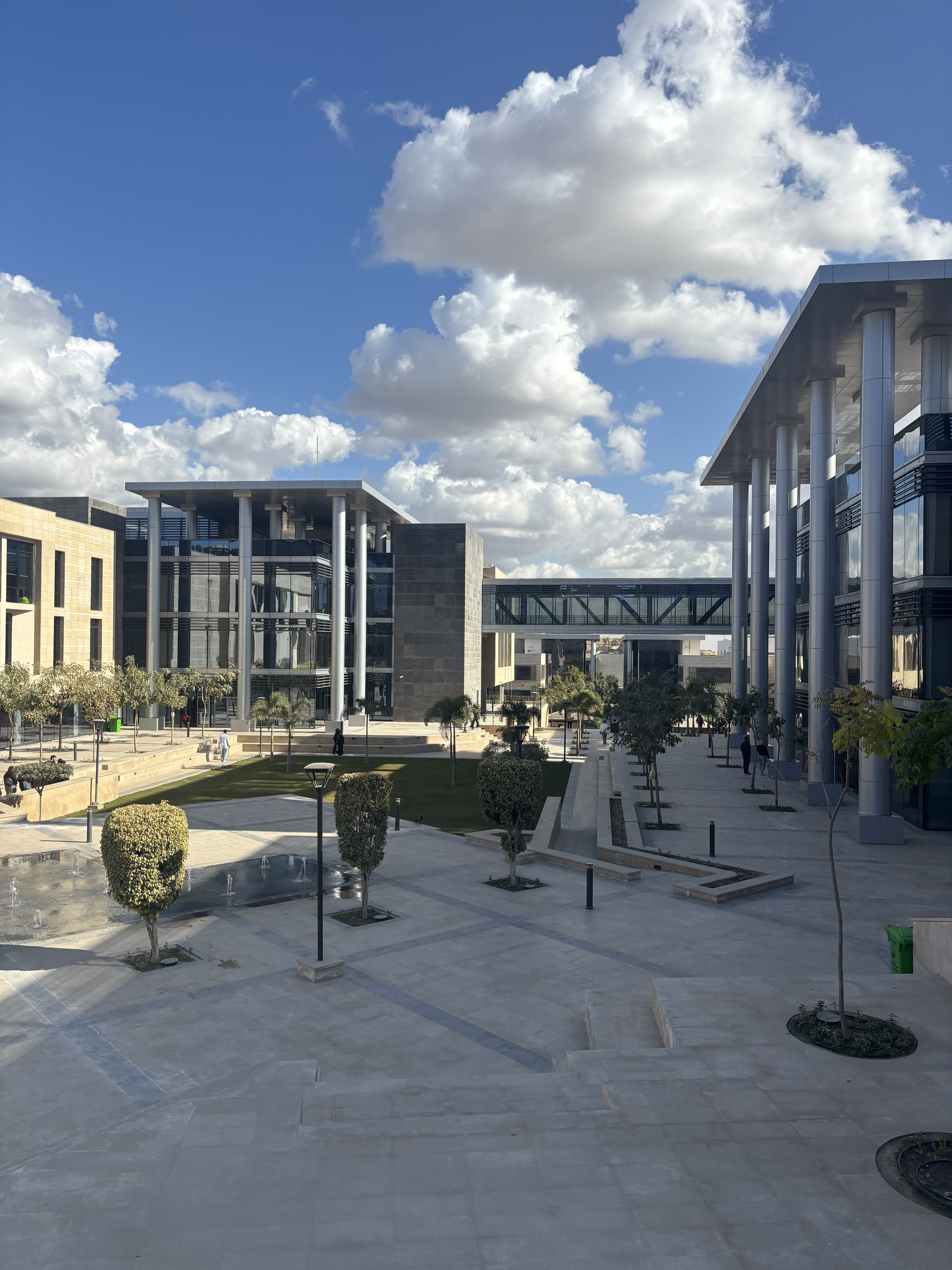
Newgiza University Campus

Newgiza University (NGU) (Egyptian Arabic: جامعة الجيزة الجديدة) is a private university situated in 6th of October, Egypt. The university welcomed its first class of students in 2016. NGU has academic collaborations with UCL, and the Milano Fashion Institute. NGU is a member of the Assosiation of Arab Universities, The Association to Advance Collegiate Schools of Business, and the United Nations Academic Impact.

== Schools ==
- School of Medicine (Accredited by NAQAAE)
- School of Dentistry (Accredited by NAQAAE)
- School of Pharmacy (Accredited by NAQAAE)
- School of Business and Finance (Accredited by NAQAAE)
- School of Economics and Politics
- School of Information Technology
- School of Engineering
- School of Arts and Design

== Future Schools ==
- School of Law
- School of Antiquities/Archeology
- School of Nursing and Health Sciences
- School of Linguistics and Translation

== NGU's School of Medicine ==
The School of Medicine at NGU offers a 5-year program followed by a 2-year internship. The curriculum is system-based, integrated, and includes early clinical exposure.

=== Examination ===
Each academic year has:

- Mid-Year Exam: 30% of total grade (Year 1 & Year 2)
- End-of-Rounds and Critical Thinking Questions: 30% of total grade (Year 3 - Year 5)
- End-of-Year Exam: 70% of total grade

Assessment is done through:

SBA (Single Best Answer)

OSPE/OSCE (Objective Structured Practical/Clinical Examination)

Critical Thinking Questions

=== Clinical Training ===
NGU has two teaching hospitals:

- NGU Community Hospital in Sayyidah Zainab, Cairo.
- Newgiza University Hospital in 6th of October City.

=== Placement Visits ===
Throughout the years, students participate in placement visits to a variety of healthcare settings, including primary care centers, specialized hospitals, and community clinics.

=== Modules ===
The School of Medicine at NGU follows a modular, system-based curriculum that spans five academic years.

==== Year 1 ====
- Introductory Module
- Infection & Defence
- Circulation & Breathing
- Behavioral Sciences
- Fluids, Nutrition, & Metabolism

==== Year 2 ====
- Movement & Musculoskeletal Biology
- Endocrine Systems & Reproduction
- Neuroscience & Behaviour
- Foundations of Clinical Practice
- Genetics, Development, & Cancer

==== Year 3 ====
- Integrated Clinical Care 1: Cardiovascular, Respiratory & Acute Care
- Integrated Clinical Care 2: Care of Surgical Patient, Gastroenterology, Gastrointestinal Surgery, Rheumatology, & Orthopedics
- Integrated Clinical Care 3: Neurology, Neurosurgery, Endocrinology, Hematology, & Nephrology

==== Year 4 ====
- Child Health
- Women’s Health
- Family, Community, & Public Health

==== Year 5 ====
- Special Senses: Dermatology, ENT, & Ophthalmology
- Oncology, Palliative Care, & Care of the Elderly
- Mental Health & Neurology
- Senior Clerkship: Medicine, Surgery, & Emergency
- Health Leadership and Innovation: Business, Artificial Intelligence, & Health Economics
- Preparation for Practice

== Accreditation and Academic Collaborations ==
NGU was endorsed by a Presidential Decree in April 2010 and has established academic collaborations with University College London (UCL), King's College London (KCL), and the Milano Fashion Institute.

NGU’s School of Pharmacy, School of Business and Finance, and School of Dentistry are accredited by the National Authority for Quality Assurance and Accreditation of Education (NAQAAE).

== On-Campus Amenities ==
Newgiza University has a variety of on-campus amenities, including cafés, restaurants, supermarkets, ATMs, and printing services.

- Cafés: Beano's, L’Aroma, CLP, Forn, Oh Ge, RVRS
- Restaurants: The Burger Factory, My Corner, Fooltank
- Supermarkets: Basics, Quick 24
- ATMs: FABMISR ATM
- Printing Services: Adham Printing

== Board of Trustees ==
- NGU Board of Trustees is headed by Eng. Ibrahim Mahlab, Former Prime Minister of Egypt.
- Dr. Ahmed Sameh Farid, President of Newgiza University.
- Amb. Ahmed Aboul Gheit, Secretary-General of the Arab League & Former Minister of Foreign Affairs.
- Dr. Ahmed Darwish, Former Minister of Administration Development.
- Dr. Mahmoud Mohey ElDin, Former Minister of Investments and World Bank Group's Senior Vice President.
- Dr. Zahi Hawass, Former Minister of Archeology.
- Dr. Samiha Fawzi, Former Minister of Trade and Industry.
- Amb. Nasser Kamel, Secretary-General of the Union for the Mediterranean.
- Dr. Lamis Ragab, Vice President for Life and Health Sciences – Newgiza University.
- Eng. Salah Diab, chairman of the board of NG.
- Dr. Mohamed Shawky
- Dr. Magdy Eshak, President of the Egyptian Medical Society – UK.
- Dr. Abdallah Ben Sadek Dahlan, Founder and Chairman of the board of Trustees, University of Business & Technology (UBT).
- Dr. Aly Hassan, Professor – Libya.

== See also ==
- Education in Egypt
- List of universities in Egypt
- List of medical schools in Egypt
