= Shafik Cabinet =

The Shafik Cabinet was led by prime minister of Egypt Ahmed Shafik from 31 January 2011 to 3 March 2011.

Office	Incumbent	Website	Since
Prime Minister	Dr. Ahmed Shafik	www.cabinet.gov.eg	2011
Vice Prime Minister	Dr. Yehia Abdel Aziz Abdel Fatah El-Gamal	www.cabinet.gov.eg	2011
Ministry of Agriculture and Land Reclamation	Dr. Ayman Farid Abu-Hadid	www.agri.gov.eg	2011
Minister of State for Antiquities Affairs	Zahi Abbas Abdel Wahab Hawas	(none)	2011
Ministry of Religious Endowment (Awqaf)	Abd Alla Al-Husseni Ahmed Helal	www.awkaf.org	2011
Ministry of Civil Aviation	Ibrahim Ahmed Mannaa	www.civilaviation.gov.eg	2011
Ministry of Communications and Information Technology (MCIT)	Dr. Maged Ibrahim Othman	www.mcit.gov.eg	2004
Ministry of Culture	Eng. Ahmed Abdel Moniem Mahmoud El-Sawy	www.ecm.gov.eg	2011
Ministry of Education	Dr. Ahmed Gamal El-Din Moussa	www.emoe.org	
Ministry of Electricity and Energy	Dr. Hassan Ahmed Younes	www.moee.gov.eg	2011
Ministry of State for the Environment Affairs	Eng. Maged George Elias Ghattas	www.eeaa.gov.eg	2004
Ministry of Finance	Dr. Samir Radwan	www.mof.gov.eg	2011
Ministry of Foreign Affairs	Mr. Ahmed Aboul Gheit	www.mfa.gov.eg	2004
Ministry of Health and Population	Dr. Ashraf Mahmoud Ibrahim Hatem	www.mohp.gov.eg	2011
Ministry of Housing, Utilities, and Urban Development	Dr. Mohamed Fathy Abdel Aziz El-Baradei	www.moh.gov.eg	2011
Ministry of Interior	Lt. General Mahmoud Wagdy	www.moiegypt.gov.eg	2011
Ministry of Justice	Counselor Mamdouh Marei	www.moj.gov.eg	2011
Ministry of State for Local Development	Mohsen El-Nomani Mohamed Hafez	www.mold.gov.eg	2006
Ministry of Manpower and Emigration	Isamel Ibrahim Fahmy	www.manpower.gov.eg	2005
Ministry of State for Military Production	Dr. Sayed Abdou Mostafa Meshaal	www.isccnet.iscc.gov.eg	2011
Ministry of Petroleum and Metallurgical Wealth	Eng. Mahmoud Latif Mahmoud Amer	www.petroleum.gov.eg	2011
Ministry of Planning and International Cooperation	Mrs. Fayza Mohamed Aboulnaga	www.mic.gov.eg	2011
Ministry of Scientific Research, Science and Technology	Dr. Amr Ezzat Salama	www.egy-mhe.gov.eg	2011
Ministry of Social Solidarity and Justice	Dr. Gouda Abdel Khalek El-Sayed Mohamed	www.mss.gov.eg	2005
Ministry of Tourism	Mounir Fakhry Abdel Nour	www.egypt.travel	2011
Ministry of Trade and Industry	Dr. Samir Youssef Ali El-Sayyad	www.mti.gov.eg	2011
Ministry of Transportation	Eng. Atef Abdel Hamid Moustafa	www.mot.gov.eg	2011
Ministry of Water Resources and Irrigation	Dr. Hussien Ehsan Al-Atfy	www.mwri.gov.eg	2011
Governor – Central Bank of Egypt	Dr. Farouk Abd El Baky El Okdah	www.cbe.org.eg	2011
Permanent Representative to the United Nations	Maged A. Abdelaziz		2011
Minister without portfolio; GID Chief	Murad Muwafi		2011
Chairman of the Suez Canal Authority	Ahmed Ali Fadel	www.suezcanal.gov.eg	1996
