= Ashraf (name) =

'Ashraf ' (Arabic: أشرف) is an Arabic name meaning 'most honorable one' or 'very noble'. It is used by many Arabs and non-Arabs regardless of their religious affiliation, both Christians and Muslims alike. In French-speaking contexts the transliteration is Achraf.

The name is not to be confused with the word ashrāf (أشراف, with a long second ā) which is the plural of the word sharīf, denoting the descendants of the Islamic prophet Muhammad. Although both words share the same root, ashrāf (lit. 'nobles' or 'highborns') is not normally used as a proper name. Its singular sharīf (also 'Shareef', 'Sherif', etc.), on the other hand, is used as a proper name.

== People ==
=== Historical ===
- Al-Ashraf Khalil (c.1262–1293) Bahrid sultan of Egypt from 1290 to 1293
- Al-Ashraf Sha'ban, Bahrid sultan of Egypt from 1363 to 1376
- Al-Ashraf Sayf-ad-Din Barsbay, Burjid sultan of Egypt from 1422 to 1438
- al-Ashraf Sayf-ad-Din Qaitbay (c. 1416/1418 – 1496) Burjid sultan of Egypt from 1468 to 1496
- al-Ashraf Qansuh al-Ghawri, Burjid sultan of Egypt from 1501 to 1516
- al-Ashraf Tuman bay II, Burjid sultan of Egypt in 1516
- Ashraf Hotak, ruler of Afghanistan from 1725 to 1729
- Ashraf us-Sultana Qajar (born 1808) Princess of Persia

=== Contemporary ===
==== Given name ====
- Ashraf Abdelwahab, Egyptian academic, business executive and politician
- Ashraf Ali Khan (disambiguation)
- Ashraf Ali Thanwi (1863–1943) Indian Islamic scholar and Sufi
- Ashraf Barhom (born 1979) Israeli Arab actor
- Achraf Bencharki (born 1994), Moroccan footballer
- Ashraf Choudhary (born 1949) Pakistani-born scientist in the field of agricultural engineering and member of the New Zealand Parliament
- Ashraf Dehghani (born 1949) Iranian political activist, and member of the Iranian People's Fadaee Guerrillas
- Ashraf El-Ashmawi, Egyptian author, judge and legal scholar
- Ashraf El-Gharably (born 1979) Egyptian Greco-Roman wrestler
- Ashraf Fahmy (1936–2001) Egyptian film director
- Ashraf Fayadh (born 1980) Saudi Arabian poet imprisoned and lashed for apostasy
- Ashraf Ghani (2001) Afghan politician
- Ashraf Ghori (born 1973) Indian artist
- Achraf Hakimi (born 1998) Moroccan footballer
- Ashraf Hendricks (born 1984) South African footballer
- Ashraf Hossain (died 2020) Bangladeshi politician
- Ashraf Hussainzada, Afghan football referee
- Ashraf Johaardien (born 1974) South African playwright
- Ashraf Kasem (born 1966) Egyptian footballer
- Achraf Lazaar (born 1992) Moroccan footballer
- Ashraf Marwan (1944–2007) Egyptian businessman
- Ashraf Nu'man (born 1986) Palestinian footballer
- Ashraf Osman (born 2001), Qatari sprinter
- Ashraf Pahlavi (1919–2016) Iranian royal, twin sister of Mohammad Reza Pahlavi, the Shah of Iran
- Ashraf Qazi (born 1942) Pakistani politician and diplomat
- Ashraf Rashid (1948–2004) Pakistani general and head of SSG
- Ashraf Rifi (born 1954) Lebanese police chief
- Achraf Tadili (born 1980) Canadian athlete

==== Middle name ====
- Ali Ashraf Darvishian (1941–2017) Iranian writer
- Ali Ashraf Sadeghi (born 1941) Iranian linguist
- Ali Ashraf Siddiqui, Indian politician
- Sheikh Ashraf Ali (born 1946) Bangladeshi footballer and coach

==== Surname ====
- Aedy Ashraf (born 2001) Malaysian actor
- Ali Ashraf (disambiguation)
  - 'Ali Ashraf (c.1735–c.1780) Iranian painter
- Bilal Ashraf (born 1979) Pakistani actor, film producer, and director
- Imran Ashraf (born 1989) Pakistani actor and writer
- Nasim Ashraf, Pakistani politician
- Raja Pervaiz Ashraf (born 2001) Pakistani politician
- Syed Ali Ashraf (1924–1998) Bangladeshi Islamic scholar and academic

== See also ==
- Sherif, another Arabic name taken from the same root
  - Şerif, the name Sherif in Turkish
