= Ali Ashraf =

Ali Ashraf is a name, and may refer to:

- Ali Ashraf (academic) (1930–1996) Indian academician
- Ali Ashraf (painter) (fl c. 1735–1780) Persian lacquer painter and miniaturist
- Ali Ashraf (politician) (1947–2021) Bangladeshi politician

== See also ==
- Ashraf (name)
- Ashraf Ali Khan (disambiguation)
