= Rania Al-Mashat =

Egyptian economist and politician

- رانيا المشاط
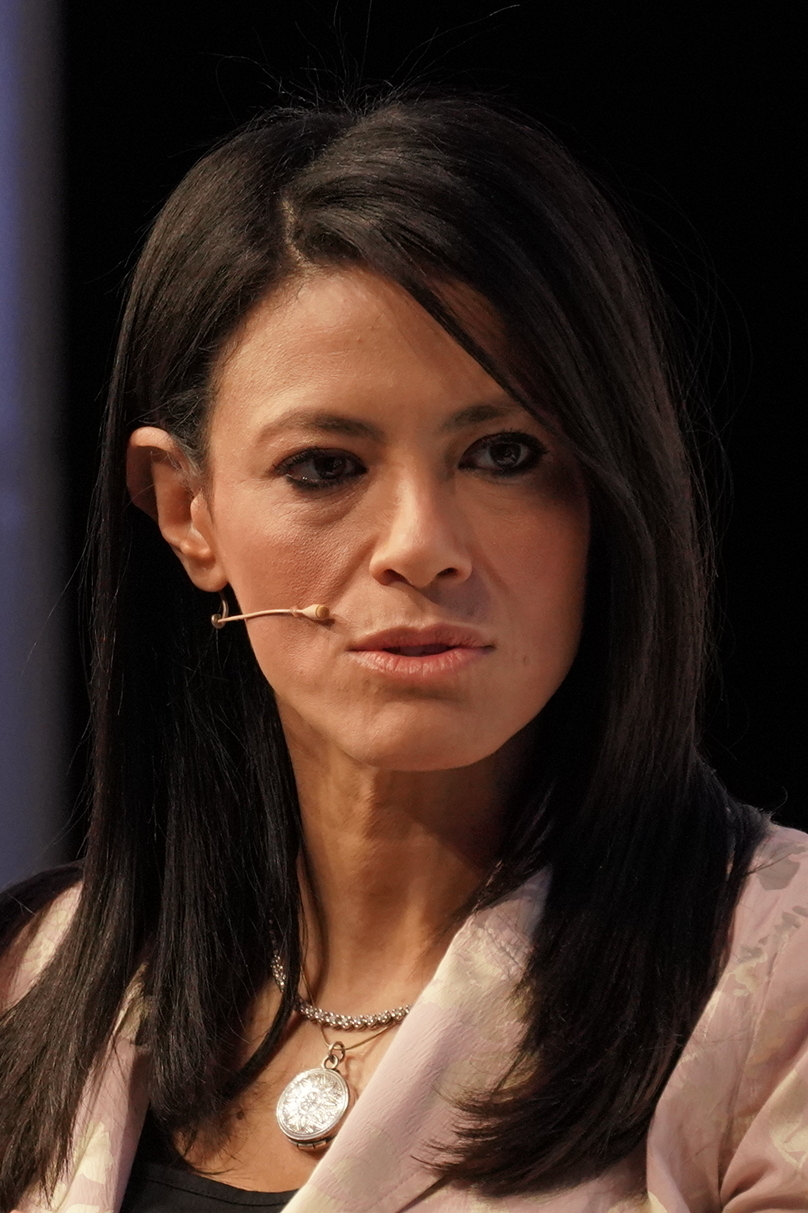
- Al-Mashat in 2019

Minister of Planning, Economic Development & International Cooperation
- In office 3 July 2024 – 10 February 2026
- Prime Minister: Moustafa Madbouly
- Preceded by: Hala Helmy el-Said
- Succeeded by: Ahmed Rostom

Minister of International Cooperation
- In office 22 December 2019 – 3 July 2024
- Prime Minister: Moustafa Madbouly
- Preceded by: Sahar Nasr

Minister of Tourism
- In office 14 January 2018 – December 2019
- Prime Minister: Sherif Ismail; Moustafa Madbouly
- Preceded by: Mohamed Yehia Rashed

Personal details
- Born: June 20, 1975 (age 51) Cairo
- Parents: Abdul-Monem Al-Mashat (father); Nagwa El-Attar (mother)
- Education: American University in Cairo; University of Maryland, College Park

Rania A. Al-Mashat (Egyptian Arabic: رانيا المشاط; born 20 June 1975) is an Egyptian economist who served as the country's Minister of Planning, Economic Development and International Cooperation. She previously served as the country's Minister of International Cooperation from December 2019 to July 2024 and former Minister of Tourism from 2018 until December 2019. She previously held high level positions at the International Monetary Fund in Washington DC and at the Central Bank of Egypt.

On 21 April 2026 she was appointed Under-Secretary-General and Executive Secretary of United Nations Economic and Social Commission for Western Asia.

== Early life and education ==
Al-Mashat was born in Cairo to Abdul-Monem Al-Mashat, a professor of Political Science at Cairo University and Nagwa el-Attar, who worked at Ain Shams University. She graduated from The American University in Cairo (AUC) in 1995 with a Bachelor of Arts in Economics. Her father was appointed Egyptian Cultural and Educational Counselor at the Egyptian Embassy in Washington DC in 1995, and Al-Mashat enrolled at the nearby University of Maryland, where she completed her master's degree in 1998 and her PhD in 2001, specializing in International Economics with a focus on monetary policy and public debt management. She also completed Executive Education certificates in Leadership and Public Policy from the Kennedy School of Government and Transformational Leadership from Said Business School.

== Career ==
Al-Mashat worked as an economist at the International Monetary Fund in Washington DC from June 2001 until July 2005. When she started at the IMF, at age 25, she was the youngest person working there. She worked on programs in India, Vietnam, and Gambia.

In August 2005, Al-Mashat returned to Egypt at the invitation of Minister of Investment Mahmoud Mohieldin to help modernise the bank's systems and dealings, where she worked as sub-governor and head of the Monetary Policy Department for the Central Bank of Egypt until May 2016. After the 2011 revolution, she helped construct and present the Government's Economic Program. She also taught economics at the American University in Cairo and served on the Boards of the Egyptian Exchange, Arab International Bank and the Middle East Economic Association.

In August 2016, Al-Mashat returned to the United States after she was appointed Advisor to the Chief Economist of the IMF, Maurice Obstfeld. She said of this role, "I think the experience I had was always to surprise people on the upside by being a capable, Arab woman." In 2017, she participated in the World Economic Forum's "Investing in Peace" panel and was listed as one of 10 economic experts whose input was sought for a discussion about "making the world a fairer place."

In January 2018, Al-Mashat was appointed Egypt's Minister of Tourism by Prime Minister Sherif Ismail, taking the number of women in the Cabinet to six. Al-Mashat became the first woman to hold the position and Egypt's youngest minister. In this role she oversees the Egyptian Tourism Promotion Board and the Tourism Development Authority. She later said she was initially surprised at her appointment, but she understood that the president wanted the tourism sector "to be handled from an economic perspective." Tourism represents between 15 and 20 percent of Egypt's GDP.

In October 2018, Al-Mashat escorted US First Lady Melania Trump on her visit to the Giza Pyramids, saying that the visit conveyed the message of "Egypt's safety and security to the world." In January 2019, Al-Mashat announced that Egypt's Grand Museum will be launched in 2020 and will be run by the private sector as part of the government plan to step away from managing many ancient sites. Al-Mashat was one of six speakers at the World Tourism Forum in Lucerne May 2019.

In August 2023, Abu Dhabi Islamic Bank Egypt (ADIB Egypt) named Al-Mashat as a member of its board of directors.

Al-Mashat has spoken out about gender equality and the importance of education, saying, "To all Egyptian girls, continue to invest in your education. The world is very competitive and what you know is what distinguishes you from anyone else."

== Awards and honours ==
Al-Mashat received the 2013 Distinguished Alumni Award from AUC. In 2014, the World Economic Forum named her a "Young Global Leader". In 2015, she was named one of the 50 most influential women in the Egyptian economy.

In March 2021, Al-Mashat received the “Champions of Change” award during a joint ceremony organised by the Embassies of Mexico, Canada, and Sweden in Cairo.

In December 2022, Al-Mashat received the award for “Most Visionary and Outstanding Minister of International Cooperation of 2022 in Africa”, presented by the George Washington University Institute of African Studies and the GE7 Initiative in the Visionary Leaders Annual Summit in Washington D.C.

== Selected publications ==
- Al-Mashat, Rania A.; Grigorian, David A. (1998). Economic Reforms in Egypt: Emerging Patterns and Their Possible Implications, Volume 1977. World Bank Publications.
- Al-Mashat, Rania A.; Billmeier, Andreas (2008). "The Monetary Transmission Mechanism in Egypt" (PDF). Review of Middle East Economics and Finance. 4 (3): 32–82. doi:10.2202/1475-3693.1126. S2CID 198795350. Archived from the original (PDF) on 2019-04-30.
- Al-Mashat, Rania (June 2008). "Monetary Policy in Egypt: A Retrospective and Preparedness for Inflation Targeting" (PDF). The Egyptian Center for Economic Studies. Archived from the original (PDF) on 2016-06-23.
- Al-Mashat, R. (2009). "Monetary policy in Egypt: a retrospective and preparedness for inflation targeting". In H. Kheir-El-Din (ed.). What Drives Prices in Egypt?. Cairo: American University in Cairo Press for the Egyptian Center for Economic Studies Publication.
- Al-Mashat, R. (2011). "The Evolution of Monetary Policy in Egypt and Steps towards Inflation Targeting". In D. Cobham; Mongi Boughzala (eds.). Inflation Targeting in MENA Countries: An Unfinished Journey. Palgrave Macmillan. pp. 230–255. doi:10.1057/9780230316560_9. ISBN 978-1-349-33139-0.
- Al-Mashat, R. (2011). "Assessing inflation and output variability using a New Keynesian model: an application to Egypt". In D. Cobham; G. Dibeh (eds.). Money in the Middle East and North Africa: Monetary Policy Frameworks and Strategies. London: Routledge.
- Al-Mashat, R.; Billmeier, A. (2012). "Push or Pull? The Determinants of Remittances to Egypt". Review of Middle East Economics and Finance. 8 (2): article 2. doi:10.1515/1475-3693.1429. S2CID 152941654.

== Personal life ==
Al-Mashat is a Muslim and she first made a pilgrimage to Mecca in 1997.
