= Naglaa El-Ahwany =

Egyptian economist, professor and politician

- نجلاء الأهواني

Minister of International Cooperation
- In office 17 June 2014 – 19 September 2015
- President: Abdel Fattah el-Sisi
- Prime Minister: Ibrahim Mahlab
- Preceded by: Ashraf El-Araby
- Succeeded by: Sahar Nasr

Personal details
- Born: 1951 (age 74–75)
- Education: Cairo University

Naglaa El-Ahwany (Egyptian Arabic: نجلاء الأهواني; born March 1951) is an Egyptian economist, professor and politician. She served as Minister of International Cooperation of Egypt between 2014 and 2015 and has been professor of economcis at the Cairo University since 1998. from 2020 until the board was reconstituted in 2025 she was member of the Board of Directors of the Central Bank of Egypt.

== Early life and education ==
El-Ahwany was born in March 1951. She obtained a master’s degree in economics from Cairo University in February 1979, completing her studies with a dissertation on the Kuwaiti model of oil extraction, and subsequently earned a PhD in economics in July 1984 from the same university with a thesis entitled Egyptian Labour Migration to the Oil States and its Relation to the Structural Changes in the Egyptian Economy.

== Research career ==
She began working as a professor assistant in 1973 after graduating from the Department of Economics at Cairo University, and has been a professor of economics since 1998. Between 1977 and 1980, she worked as economic researcher at the Arab Planning Institute in Kuwait. Subsequently, she served as a consultant and researcher to various international organisations, including the International Labour Organization (1995–1997 and 2000–2002), the United Nations Economic and Social Commission for Western Asia (1998–2000) and the American Chamber of Commerce in Egypt (1999–2002). Between 2002 and 2006, El-Ahwany was Director of the Centre for European Studies at the Faculty of Economics and Political Science of Cairo University, and also worked for the Advisory Board of the Migration and Development Research Center at Coventry University in the UK and the Board of Directors of the Cabinet ERADA Initiative and the Arab Society for Economic Research. From October 2006 to May 2010 she served as Deputy Director and Senior Economist at the Egyptian Center for Economic Studies (ECES).

She has also served as Chairwoman of the French University of Egypt Board of Trustees and has worked at the Supreme Council of Universities. El-Ahwany is member of the National Council for Women's economic committee and of the Egyptian Regulatory Reform and Development Activity.

In January 2020, President Abdel Fattah el-Sisi appointed her member of the Board of Directors of the Central Bank of Egypt. El-Ahwany was not renewed in the Board's renewal which took place in December 2025. In 2021 she named member of the Board of Directors of Allianz Insurance in Egypt.

== Political career ==
She has been Technical Director of the Prime Minister Ibrahim Mahlab's Office. On 18 May 2011, El-Ahwany was appointed economic advisor of the Cabinet of Egypt amid economic crisis warnings and high levels of poverty.

El-Ahwany was announced as the new Minister of International Cooperation in the new cabinet of Prime Minister Ibrahim Mahlab in the first government of President el-Sisi on 16 June 2014. She was sworn in the following day.

In December 2014, El-Ahwany signed a protocol with France worth more than seven million euros to finance the new navigation systems at Taba International Airport. In March 2015 she signed with the Japanese ambassador a protocol to finance the construction of Dairut Dam. In April 2015, she announced government's measures to reform the energy sector and reduce fuel subsidies.

She was succeeded by Sahar Nasr on 19 September 2015.
