= Ebeid Cabinet =

- Cabinet of Egypt
- Date formed: 5 October 1999
- Date dissolved: 14 July 2004

People and organisations
- Head of state: Hosni Mubarak
- Head of government: Atef Ebeid
- Member party: National Democratic Party (Egypt)
- Status in legislature: Supermajority

History
- Election: 1999 Egyptian presidential confirmation referendum
- Predecessor: First Ganzouri Cabinet
- Successor: Nazif Cabinet

The Ebeid Cabinet was the government of Egypt which was led by Prime Minister Atef Ebeid from 5 October 1999 – 14 July 2004. It was succeeded by the Nazif Cabinet.

== List of ministers ==
Atef Ebeid Cabinet (October 1999 - July 2004)
Office	Incumbent	Since
Prime Minister	Dr. Atef Ebeid	1999
Deputy Prime Minister and Agriculture and Land Reclamation Minister	Yousef Wali	1982
Defence and Military Production Minister	Field Marshal Mohamed Hussein Tantawi	1991
Foreign Minister	Amr Moussa	1991-2001
Interior Minister	Habib El-Adli	
Information Minister	Safwat El-Sherif	
Higher Education Minister and Minister of State for Scientific Research	Moufid Shehab	
Justice Minister	Farouk Seif Al Nasr	
Awqaf (religious endowments) Minister	Mahmoud Zakzouk	
Culture Minister	Farouk Hosny	1987
Tourism Minister	Mamdouh El-Beltagui	
Minister of State for People's Assembly and Shura Council Affairs	Kamal El-Shazli	
Housing, Utilities and Urban Communities Minister	Mohamed Ibrahim Suleiman	
Manpower and Emigration Minister	Ahmed El-Amawi	
Minister of State for Administrative Development	Mohamed Zaki Abu Amer	
Health and Population Minister	Ismail Sallam	
Public Works and Water Resources Minister	Mahmoud Abdel-Halim Abu Zeid	
Minister of State for Environment	Nadia Makram Ebeid	
Education Minister	Kamel Bahaeddin	
Minister of Economy and Foreign Trade	Youssef Boutros Ghali	1997 (given Foreign Trade portfolio in 1999)
Minister of youth Affairs	Alieddin Hilal	1999
Minister of Energy and Electricity	Ali El-Sa'idi	1999
Minister of Petroleum	Sameh Fahmi	1999
Minister of Finance	Medhat Hassanein	1999
Minister of Public Business Sector	Mukhtar Khattab	1999
planning minister and state minister for international cooperation	Ahmed El-Darsh	1999
minister of state for military production	Sayed Mesh'al	1999
minister of insurance and social affairs	Amina El-Guindi	1999
Minister of technological development and industry (formerly "industry and mineral wealth")	Mustafa El-Rifai	1999
Minister of Transport	Ibrahim El-Demeiri	1999
Minister of Communications and Information Technology	Ahmed Nazif	1999
Minister of supply and internal trade	Hassan Khedr	1999
Minister of local development	Mustafa Abdel-Qader	1999
Cabinet Secretary-General	Ahmed Hassan Abu Taleb	1999
