= Ali El Selmi =

Egyptian politician

Deputy Prime Minister
- In office 16 July 2011 – 2 December 2011
- Prime Minister: Essam Sharaf
- Preceded by: Yehia Gammal

Personal details
- Born: Ali Mohamed Abdel Hafiz El Selmi; 3 December 1936 (age 89) Alexandria, Kingdom of Egypt
- Party: Wafd Party
- Website: Official website

Ali El Selmi (Arabic: علي السلمي; born 3 December 1936) is an Egyptian liberal academic and politician who served as a deputy prime minister from July to December 2011 in the interim government in Egypt.

== Career ==
Selmi is a professor of economics and a senior member of the liberal Wafd Party. As of 2012 he was also deputy head of the party. Selmi served as the minister of administrative development. He was appointed deputy prime minister for political affairs in the interim government headed by Prime Minister Essam Sharaf on 16 July 2011. Selmi replaced Yehia Gammal in the post, who resigned from office.

Selmi announced shortly after his appointment that the privatization program had been ended. On 1 November 2011, the cabinet announced a set of principles developed by Selmi regarding the prospective constitution of Egypt, which were officially called the "Declaration of the Fundamental Principles of the New Egyptian State", but more commonly known as "Selmi document". The document supported the increased role and political influence of the Egyptian army. On 18 November 2011, it was protested by hundreds of thousands of Egyptians in the Tahrir square. Selmi's tenure lasted until December 2011 when the interim cabinet resigned.
