= Abdul-Monem Al-Mashat =

Egyptian diplomat, scholar, political scientist

- Education: Cairo University
- Scientific career
- Fields: Political science, national security

Abdul-Monem Al-Mashat (Arabic: عبدالمنعم المشّاط) is an Egyptian political scientist and an expert on national security. He served on the Egyptian Embassy in Washington, D.C., in the World Bank, in the Institute of International Education, and in numerous academic positions, including as a director of several research institutions.

== Biography ==
Al-Mashat obtained a BA and an MA in political science from Cairo University in 1970 and 1975 respectively. He earned his PhD from the University of North Carolina at Chapel Hill in 1982; the title of his thesis was "Considerations in the Analysis of National Security in the Third World".

His first academic work was published in 1977. Al-Mashat's publications cover topics such as national security, the Arab-Israeli conflict, foreign policy in the Arab world, Arabic culture, education reform, development in the Arab world, Arab security, U.S. foreign policy, and political development in the third world.

Al-Mashat's daughter, Rania El-Mashat, has been Egypt's Minister of Tourism since January 2018.

== Career ==
This is a list of posts that Abdul-Monem Al-Mashat has held during his career:

- 1974–1977 — Cairo University, Department of Political Science, assistant lecturer
- 1975 — Ștefan Gheorghiu Academy, Romania, participant in a seminar
- 1981–1982 — City University of New York, Images of Conflict Project, adjunct professor
- 1981–1985 — International Peace Research Association (IPRA), Executive Council, member
- 1982 — American Association for the Advancement of Science (AAAS), member
- 1982–1986, 1992–1995, and September 2005 – present — Cairo University, Department of Political Science, professor
- 1985–present — Government of Egypt, consultant
- 1985–present — International Institute for Strategic Studies, London, member
- 1985–present — Arab Political Science Association, member
- 1986–1992 — Al Ain University, United Arab Emirates, Department of Political Science, professor
- 1987–present — Arab International Studies Association, member
- 1992–1993 — American University in Cairo, Department of Political Science, professor
- 1994–1995 — Cairo University, Faculty of Economics and Political Sciences (FEPS), dean
- 1995 – March 1998 — Embassy of Egypt, Washington, D.C.; Egyptian Cultural and Educational Bureau (ECEB); counselor and director
- 1997–present — Al-Hewar Center; Vienna, Virginia, U.S.; advisory board; member
- March 1998 – August 2005 — World Bank, Washington D.C., Joint Japan/World Bank Graduate Scholarship Program (JJ/WBGSP) and Robert S. McNamara Fellowships Program (RSMFP), scholarships administrator
- 2000–2005 — Institute of International Education, Hubert Humphrey Fellowship Program, reviewing committee, member
- 2004 — Association of Egyptian-American Scholars, advisory board, member
- 2005 — Supreme Council of Culture, Egypt, member
- 2006–present — Future University, Egypt, faculty of economic and political science, dean
- June 2006 – August 2008 — Cairo University, Center for Political Research and Studies, professor and director
- December 2006 – present — Cairo Center for Civic Education and Development (CCCED), founder and CEO
- 2007–present — Supreme Administrative Court for Political Parties, First Circuit, member
- 2008–present — Economic and Political Science Accreditation and Quality Control National Commission, member
- 2009–present — Center for National Studies at National Council of Women, board of directors, member
- February 2010 – present — Cairo Center for the Culture of Democracy, director

== Awards ==
Al-Mashat has won a number of academic awards:

- Citation of Stewardship and Commitment to Field of International Development from Harvard University (2002)
- American Association for the Advancement of Science (AAAS) award to participate in the Annual Convention in Washington DC, January (1981)
- University of North Carolina Graduate School Award to study American Policy in Washington (1978)
- Nasser's Award for Excellence in High School Exam in Egypt (1965)
