= Anas el-Fiqqi =

Egyptian politician

Anas el-Fiqqi (Arabic: أنس الفقي; alternate spelling: Anas El Feki, Anas El-Feki, Anas al-Fiqi, Anas El-Fekky or el-Fiqi) (14 October 1960) is an Egyptian entrepreneur and former state official, well known for being Hosni Mubarak's last minister of information.

Anas el-Fiqq served as minister of youth in Egypt as part of Ahmed Nazif's first cabinet in July 2004. Less than a year later he switched places with Mamdouh El-Beltagui to become Minister of Information in February 2005. By 2007 he held a Credit Suisse account with a maximum balance worth over 3 million Swiss francs ($2.6 million), per Suisse secrets. In 2014, he was convicted of wasting public funds.

On 30 January 2011, he was crediting for closing the TV channel offices of Al Jazeera in Cairo.

A demand voiced by some of those involved in the 2011 Egyptian protests was that el-Fiqqi step down as Minister of Information. On 10 February 2011, ahead of an address to the Egyptian people by President Hosni Mubarak, el-Fiqqi told Reuters that Mubarak would not be standing down as president, despite widespread rumours to the contrary. On 12 February, the day after the president resigned against the background of the Egyptian Revolution of 2011, he was reported to be under house arrest. The same day he resigned from his position as Minister of Information.

== See also ==
- Media of Egypt
