= Ashraf Ali Khan (disambiguation) =

Ashraf Ali Khan may refer to:

- Ashraf Ali Khan (before 1759–1770), Bengali monarch, a ruler of Bengal.
- Ashraf Ali Khan (politician, born 1898) (1898-1975), politician and independence activist
- Ashraf Ali Khan (politician, born 1972)

== See also ==
- Ashraf (name)
- Ali Ashraf (disambiguation)
- Ashraf Ali Khan Chowdhury, Bengali lawyer and politician
- Ashraf Ali Khan Khasru, Bangladeshi politician
