= Mamdouh Marei =

Egyptian jurist and politician (1938–2018)

Minister of Justice
- In office August 2006 – March 2011
- President: Hosni Mobarak
- Prime Minister: Ahmed Nazif; Ahmed Shafik
- Preceded by: Mahmoud Abul Leil
- Succeeded by: Mohamed Abdel Aziz Al Jundi

Personal details
- Born: 1938
- Died: 7 October 2018 (aged 79–80)

Mamdouh Marei (1938–2018) was an Egyptian jurist who served as the minister of justice in the period 2006–2011 just before the Arab Spring. He also served in various senior judicial positions.

== Biography ==
Marei was born in 1938. He worked as the president of the Appeals Court from 2001 to 2003 and then, as the head of Supreme Constitutional Court between 2003 and 2006. In August 2006 he was appointed justice minister, replacing Mahmoud Abul Leil in the post. Marei was appointed by President Hosni Mubarak to the post to expel those judges who protested the Mubarak's intervention in the legal issues and the results of the presidential election in 2005. In 2007 thirty female judges were assigned to the courts which was the first massive appointment of women jurists in Egypt. It was a result of Marei's and Mokbel Shakir's, head of the Supreme Judicial Council, support for the female jurists. Marei remained in office until March 2011 and served first in the cabinet of Ahmed Nazif and in the short-term cabinet led by Ahmed Shafik. Just before the end of Marei's tenure a group of judges called for his removal from the post. Marei's successor as justice minister was Mohamed Abdel Aziz Al Jundi.

Marei died on 7 October 2018 at age 80, and the same day funeral prayers were held at Al Mowasah Mosque in Alexandria.
