= Sayed Meshaal =

Egyptian politician (born 1942)

Sayed Meshaal (born 1942) is a former Egyptian politician. He was minister of military production from 1999 to 2011.

== Life ==
Sayed Meshaal graduated with a B.Sc. in chemistry from Cairo University. In 2000 he was elected a National Democratic Party MP, and remained an MP for almost a decade.

He was minister for military production throughout the 2004-2011 Nazif Cabinet. In 2010 Mostafa Bakry, running against Meshaal to represent Helwan Governorate, accused Meshaal of buying votes.

Despite his association with the Mubarak regime, Meshaal managed to keep his position in Essam Sharaf's cabinet after the Egyptian Revolution of 2011.

In November 2012 the Administrative Supervisory Authority announced Meshaal was under investigation for corruption.
