= Cairo Center for the Culture of Democracy =

- Founded: 2011
- Founder: Dr. Abdul-Monem Al-Mashat
- Location: Cairo, Egypt
- Region served: Egypt and Arab World

Established after the 2011 Egyptian Revolution, Cairo Center for the Culture of Democracy aims at the maintenance and promotion of the January 25 Revolution spirit: democracy, freedom and social justice. It works to help create an Egyptian democratic society based on accountability, transparency and good governance.

Under the leadership of its president Dr. Abdul-Monem Al-Mashat, The center conducts a diverse set of political activities including trainings, public lectures, publishing policy papers and booklets and conducting research about modules of democracy and patterns of participation appropriate for Egypt and the Arab world.

Among its recent activities is a workshop addressing the "Democratic Transformation in Egypt" conducted in seven different Egyptian cities: Al-areesh, Ras Sedr, Giza, Nuebaa', Bani Sewief, Alexandria and Cairo. Another conference was dedicated to the analysis of the mechanism of the conversion of the Egyptian youth activism to political initiatives in the fields of politics, social justice, economy, public health and security. Other conferences and workshops focused on the democratic transition and the rule of law in addition to the upcoming 2011–12 Egyptian parliamentary election.

The center is partners with the Konrad Adenauer Foundation.

== Objectives ==
The center's goals are:

• Disseminate the culture of democracy, values of civic cultures and human rights among all stakeholders especially youth.

• Educate the public the rules of the game in the political process; rights and obligations.

• Training of trainers especially members of political parties, non-governmental organizations, and civil society activists on political processes including political mobilization.

• Enforce mechanisms of monitoring political actions and activities.

• Encourage women to actively participate in politics by providing them with knowledge about their constitutional and legal rights.

• Upgrade level of information and knowledge about democratic and advance societies held by media professionals in order to be confident in transferring it to Arab societies.

• Respect political, religious and professional differences as means to enrich and positively activate political life.

• Encourage politically active citizens to organize and assemble in political organizations such as political parties, syndicates and alert communities.

• Promote decentralization processes as a mechanism for political accountability and transparency.

== Products ==
• Hold conferences, workshops, seminars where experts and policy makers from Egypt, the Arab world and the world at large will interact with trainees and target groups.

• Conduct research and studies about modules of democracy and patterns of participation appropriate for Egypt and the Arab world.

• Manage training workshops for civic society activists, media professionals, students both in schools and universities, non-governmental organizations in different governorates in order to upgrade their political culture and conscience.

• Arrange public lectures where public figures, politicians as well as academicians and others from Egypt and different countries are invited to exchange their experience with young people.

• Publish policy papers, booklets, newsletters and books to help students, researchers and policy makers to understand the democratization process especially the transformation from authoritarianism and totalitarianism to democracy.
