= Mohammad Zaman =

17th century Iranian painter and illuminator

- محمد زمان
- Born: Mohammad Zaman ibn Haji Yusof Qomi; Kerman, Safavid Iran
- Years active: 1650–c. 1700
- Notable work: See list
- Style: Farangi-Sazi
- Father: Haji Yusof Qomi

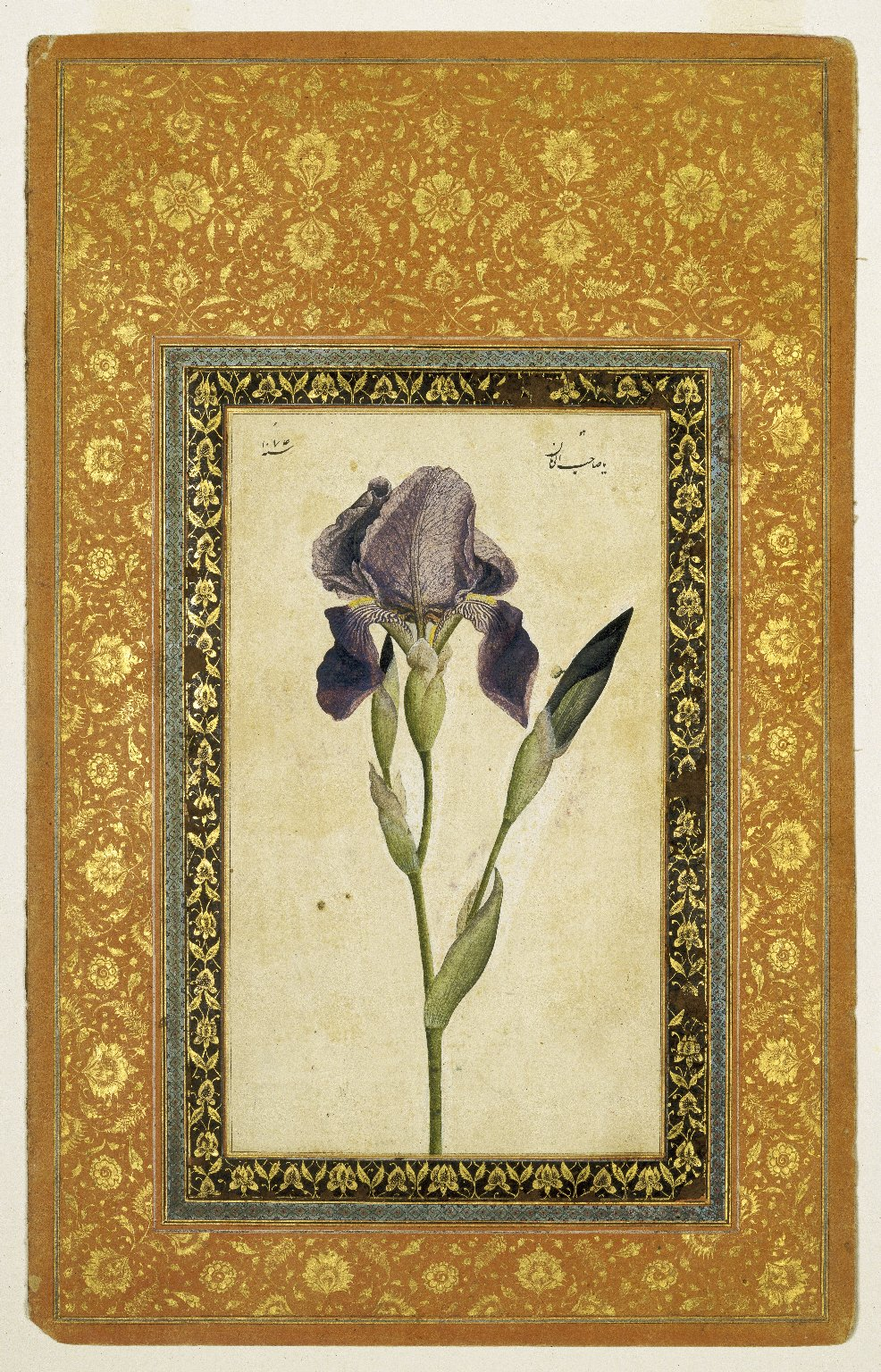
Blue Iris by Muhammad Zaman, Brooklyn Museum, 1663–1664.

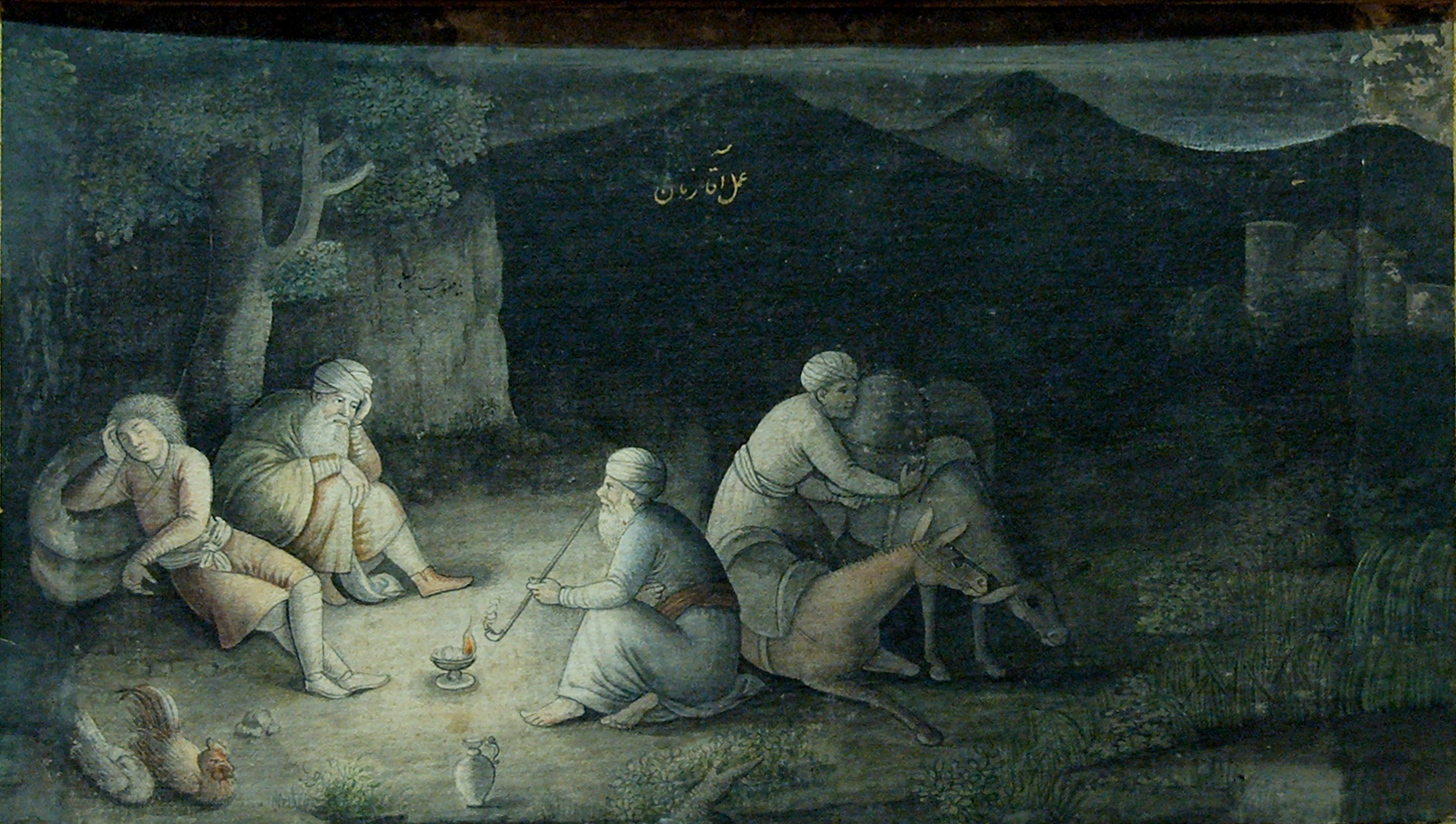
The Night Halt by Muhammad Zaman, a page from an album of paintings and calligraphy, Musée du Louvre, 1660–1675

Mohammad Zaman ibn Haji Yusof Qomi, known as Mohammad Zaman (Persian: محمد زمان; fl. 1650 – c. 1700), was a famous Iranian calligrapher and painter of the Safavid period.

== Life ==
Despite being a well-known artist in mid and late 17th-century Safavid Iran, his life is shrouded in mystery, it was previously claimed that the painter Mohammad Zaman was born in Kerman, Persia to Haji Yusuf, and received his education in Tabriz by Nicholas Martinovich and Fredrik Martin, it is likely that they mixed up the painter with another man with the same name. The date and place of birth of the Safavid painter Mohammad Zaman remain unknown. Similarly, the claim that he was sent by Shah Abbas II of Persia to Rome to study Italian painting, and there he converted to Christianity cannot be confirmed. The Persian paintings signed or attributed to Mohammad Zaman in fact reference Flemish engravings instead of Italian sources. Therefore, it likely was a different man bearing the same name who converted, took the name of Paolo, and was forced to flee to India because of his conversion to Christianity.

The artist Mohammad Zaman made paintings for manuscripts such as Nizami's Khamsa or the Shahnameh as well as some paintings with European subject matter. Furthermore, he was influential in training several other painters, including Mohammad-Ali and Mohammad-Ebrahim.

== Notable works ==
Year	Title	Medium	Dimensions	Current location	Place of Creation
1660–1675 CE	The Night Halt (Saint Petersburg Album Page)	Ink, colors and gold on paper	13.5 x 20.1 in. (34.5 x 51 cm)	Louvre Museum	Iran
1663–1664 C.E.	Blue Iris	Ink, opaque watercolor on paper; gilded borders	Sheet: 13 1/16 x 8 3/8 in. (33.2 x 21.3 cm)	Brooklyn Museum	Isfahan, Iran
1663–69 CE	Shahnama (Book of Kings) of Firdausi	Opaque watercolor, ink, silver and gold on paper	18 1/2 x 11 1/8 in. (47 x 28.2 cm)	Metropolitan Museum of Art	Likely Isfahan, Iran
1664–65 CE	A Night-time Gathering	Ink, opaque watercolor, and gold on paper	Page: 13 1/8 x 8 1/4 in. (33.3 x 21 cm) Mat: 19 1/4 in x 14 1/4 in. (48.9 x 36.2 cm)	Metropolitan Museum of Art	Iran or India
1675–76 CE	Bahram Gur proves his worthiness by killing a dragon and recovering treasure from a cave (in Khamsa of Nizami)	Painting on paper	8.6 x 7.1 in (21.9 x 18.1 cm)	The British Library	Safavid Iran
1675–76 CE	Episode from the Indian Princess’s story: King Turktazi’s visit to the magical garden of Turktaz, Queen of the Faeries (in Khamsa of Nizami)	Painting on paper	9.9 x 7.1 in (25.2 x 18 cm)	The British Library	Safavid Iran
1675–76 CE	The servant girl Fitnah impresses Bahram Gur with her strength by carrying an ox on her shoulders (in Khamsa of Nizami)	Painting on paper	8.3 x 5.1 in (21 x 13 cm)	The British Library	Mazandaran Province
1675–1676 CE	The sīmurgh arrives to assist Rūdāba with the birth of Rustam, from the Book of Kings (Shāhnāma)	Pigment, gold pigment, and ink on paper	408 mm x 261 mm	Chester Beatty Library	Isfahan, Iran
1675–1676 CE	Salm and Tūr organise the murder of their brother Īraj, from the Book of Kings (Shāhnāma)	Pigment, gold pigment, and ink on paper	408 mm x 262 mm	Chester Beatty Library	Isfahan, Iran
1676 CE	Majnun visited by his father	Opaque watercolor, ink, and gold on paper.		Arthur M. Sackler Gallery, Lent by The Art and History Collection	Isfahan, Iran
1680 CE	Judith with the Severed Head of Holofernes	Ink, gold and opaque watercolor on paper; mounted as an album page on card	Page: 13.1 x 8.2 in (33.5 x 21 cm) Painting excluding floral paneling: 7.9 x 6.6 in (20.1 x 17 cm)	The Khalili Collection of Islamic Art	Isfahan, Iran

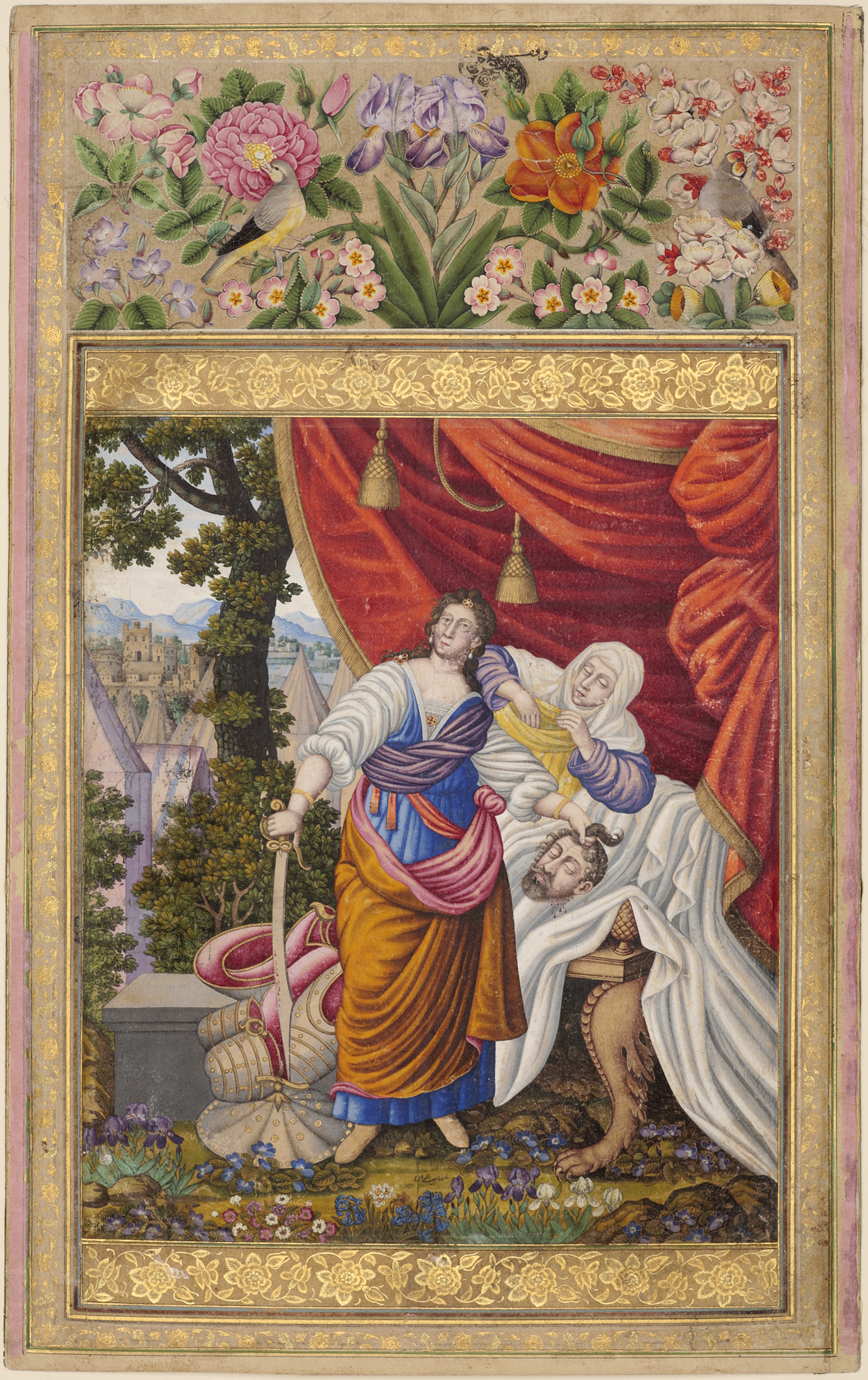
Judith with the Severed Head of Holofernes, The Khalili Collection of Islamic Art, c. 1680 AD.

Six of his paintings from 1678 to 1689 were of Biblical scenes. A painting of Judith with the severed head of Holofernes, currently in the Khalili Collection of Islamic Art, is signed "Ya sahib al-zaman", one of the titles of the 12th Shia Imam, Muhammad al-Mahdi. Mohammad Zaman used this phrase in place of a signature, and on that basis the painting is attributed to him.

=== Farangi-Sazi ===
Mohammad Zaman favored night scenes, and his work combined multiple influences, drawing subjects from European paintings but with Mughal or Kashmiri stylistic touches. He introduced a European style to Safavid painting in manuscripts known as farangi-sazi. This style combines Persian iconography and compositional elements with more European elements, such as chiaroscuro, atmospheric effect, and “Western” perspective. The style could also be seen in his forest scenes, which include exaggerated forms, heavy contrasts between light and dark, and picturesque mountains and streams.

=== Contributions to the Khamsa of Nizami ===
The Khamsa of Nizami, a manuscript of five poems by poet Nizami Ganjavi, is known for its Safavid illustrations—three of which are attributed to Mohammad Zaman. It has been suggested that he produced these paintings in the 17th century as additions to the original manuscript. It is also suggested that the paintings by Mohammad Zaman were inserted in the Khamsa of Nizami after being removed from somewhere else, as there is some damage to the upper sections. His signature and the date inscription can be found on two of the paintings, however all three resemble another painting attributed to Mohammad Zaman, "Majnun in the Wilderness."

Mohammad Zaman's depiction of the tale of Bahram Gur and the Indian Princess features wingless faeries, different from other depictions of the scene. The text adjacent to the image is a section of the Tale of the Indian Princess, which ends with a description of food and wine for a banquet in the King and Queen's pavilion. However, Mohammad Zaman's depiction does not include this pavilion scene, instead depicting King Turktazi and the Queen of the Faeries.

Some of his notable students include 'Ali Ashraf.

== Sources ==
- Habibi, Negar (2021). "Farangi-Sazi". In Yarshater, Ehsan (ed.). Encyclopædia Iranica (Online ed.). Encyclopædia Iranica Foundation.
- Landau, Amy S. (2011). "From Poet to Painter: Allegory and Metaphor in a Seventeenth-Century Persian Painting by Muhammad Zaman, Master of Farangī-Sāzī". Muqarnas Online. 28 (1): 101–131. doi:10.1163/22118993-90000175.
- Melville, Charles, ed. (2021). Safavid Persia in the Age of Empires: The Idea of Iran Vol. 10. I.B. Tauris. ISBN 978-0755633777.
