= Maged George =

Egyptian politician, minister of state for environmental affairs

Maged George Elias Ghattas

Minister of State for Environmental Affairs
- Incumbent
- Assumed office 14 July 2004
- President: Mohamed Tantawi (Acting)

Personal details
- Born: 25 November 1949 (age 76) (Egypt) Cairo
- Education: Ain Shams University (B.Sc. 1971), Military Technical College (B.Sc 1972)

Maged George Elias Ghattas (born 25 November 1949) is an Egyptian politician with a military background. He has been Minister of State for Environmental Affairs since 14 July 2004, initially as part of the cabinet of Prime Minister Ahmed Nazif.

== Education ==
Ghattas graduated with a B.Sc. in Mechanical Power Engineering from the Faculty of Engineering at Ain Shams University in 1971. Joining the military on 1 February 1972, he gained a B.Sc. in Military Science from the Egyptian Military Academy in 1972.

== Career ==
Ghattas took part in the 6th October War against Israel and continued his career in the military.

On 14 July 2004 he was appointed Minister of State for Environmental Affairs. Despite his association with the Mubarak regime, he managed to keep his position in Essam Sharaf's cabinet after the Egyptian Revolution of 2011.

== Personal life ==
Ghattas is a Coptic Christian.

== See also ==
- Cabinet of Egypt

Political offices
Preceded by	Minister of State for Environmental Affairs; 2011–present	Incumbent
