= Aisha Abdel Hadi =

Egyptian trade unionist and politician

- عائشة عبد الهادي
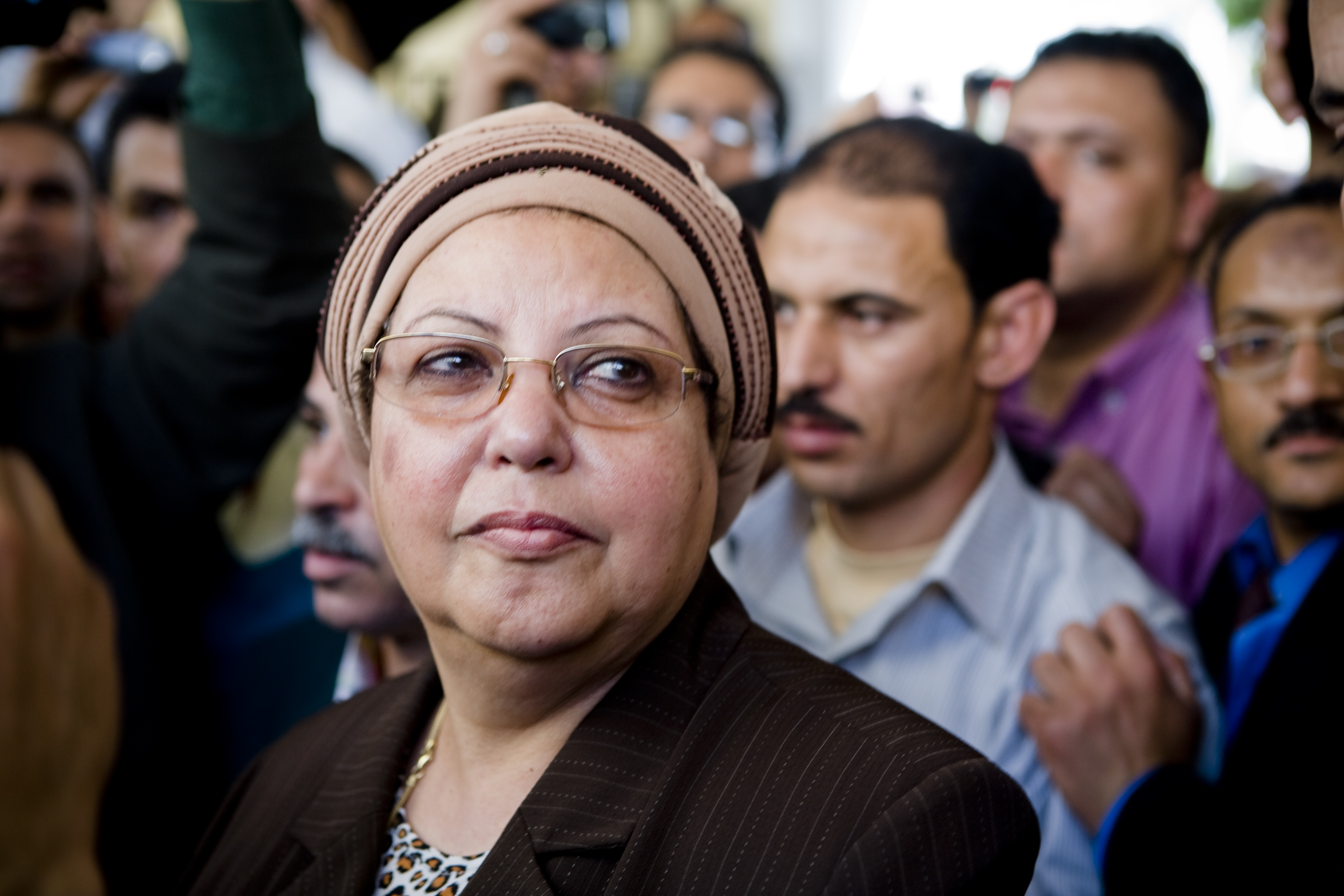
- Aisha Abdel Hadi in 2009

Minister of Labour and Immigration
- In office 31 December 2005 – 22 February 2011
- President: Hosni Mubarak; Muhammad Hussein Tantawy (acting)
- Prime Minister: Ahmed Nazif; Ahmed Shafik
- Preceded by: Sharif El-Sherbini
- Succeeded by: Ahmed Hassan El-Borai

Personal details
- Party: National Democratic Party
- Occupation: Politician; Trade unionist

Aisha Abdel Hadi (Egyptian Arabic: عائشة عبد الهادي) is an Egyptian trade unionist and politician. She served as Minister of Labour and Immigration of Egypt between 2005 and 2011, and previously served as the vice-chairwoman of the Egyptian Trade Union Federation.

== Early life ==
Hadi began working at a very young age in a state-owned pharmaceutical factory, where she became involved in the country’s trade union movement and was elected a trade union representative in 1959. She later joined the Egyptian Trade Union Federation, where she served as vice-chairwoman until her appointed to the cabinet of Egypt in 2005. Hadi also led the Arab Women's Committee of the International Trade Union Confederation.

== Political career ==
She joined Hosni Mubarak's National Democratic Party and became a senior party official. After the 2005 parliamentary election Aisha was appointed Minister of Labour and Immigration and was sworn in by President Hosni Mubarak on 31 December 2005, becoming the first woman to head this ministry and the first minister to wear an Islamic headscraf.

In June 2009, she stated that the ministry was “at war” with employers who preferred Asian workers over Egyptian ones, defending her commitment to domestic workers and saying that the government would be working to address the situation with employers regarding wages. In January 2011, she announced that the Italian government will reserve a percentage of jobs for Egyptians within its labour migration programmes, in order to maintain state-level coordination of regulated labour migration.

During her term in office, Hadi faced numerous workers’ strikes, such as the massive one in December 2006 in Mahalla, the strike at the Tanta Flax and Oil Company factory in February 2010 and a nationwide one in August 2010.

Her comments suggesting that university graduates are only suited to working in security sparked considerable controversy, as did her signing of an agreement facilitating the recruitment of Egyptian women as domestic workers in Gulf countries, an agreement that was eventually suspended.

After the fall of Hosni Mubarak on 11 February 2011, during the 2011 Egyptian revolution, the press speculated that Hadi would be fired soon. In light of this information, the Egyptian Trade Union Federation expressed its opposition to a change of minister, whilst other independent trade unions rejected the possibility of new ministers linked to the former Mubarak regime, and both sides protested against the names of ministers that had been speculated. She left the office on 22 February 2011 when was succeeded by Ismail Ibrahim Fahmy after a new cabinet was appointed.

In April 2011, she was among the 25 officials charged with participating in attacks against demonstrators during the so-called Battle of the Camels on 2 February, and she was released on bail. She was formally charged and brought to trial in July 2011, which began on 11 September of that year; she fainted and was admitted to hospital during the court hearing on 12 May 2012 whilst in the defendants dock. She was acquitted on 10 October 2012.
