= Sahar Nasr =

Egyptian politician

- سحر نصر
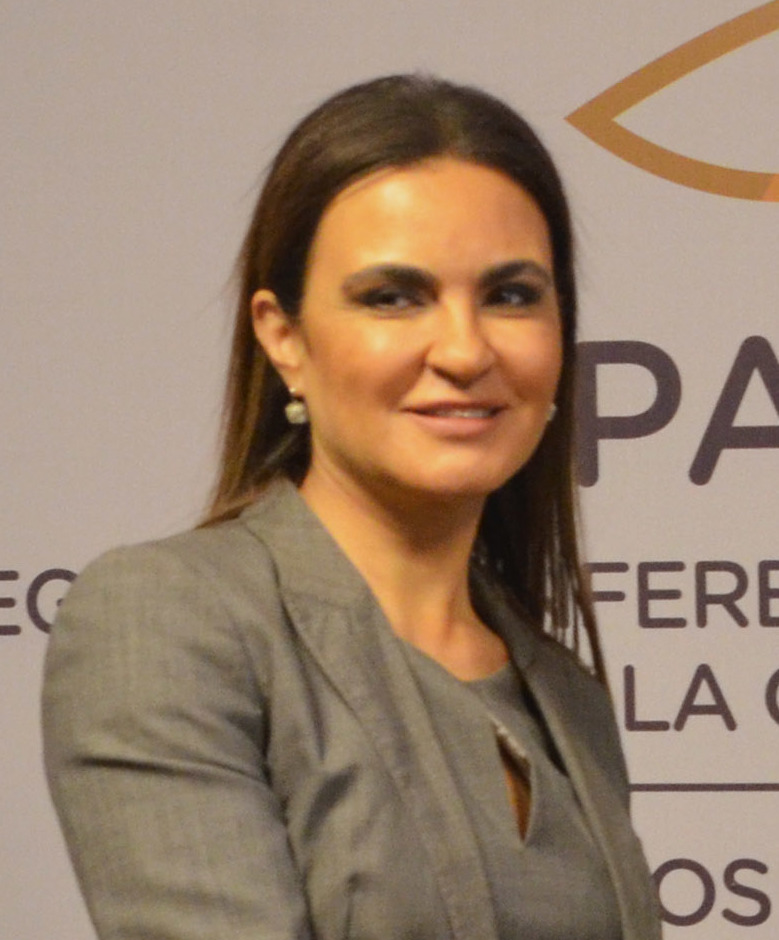
- Sahar Nasr in 2019

Minister of Investment and International Cooperation
- In office 15 September 2015 – 22 December 2019
- President: Abdel Fattah el-Sisi
- Prime Minister: Sherif Ismail
- Preceded by: Naglaa el-Ahwany
- Succeeded by: Rania El-Mashat

Personal details
- Born: 1964 (age 61–62)
- Party: Independent
- Education: American University; Cairo University
- Website: saharnasrofficial

Sahar Nasr (Arabic: سحر نصر, born in 1964) is an Egyptian politician who served as the Minister of Investment and International Cooperation between 2015 and 2019.

== Education and career ==
Born in 1964, Nasr graduated from the American University in 1985 with a degree in economics and mathematics, and in 1990 received a master's degree. In 1993–1995, she worked in the American Chamber of Commerce of Egypt. In 1995–1996, she worked as a consultant on the Arthur Andersen audit company privatization project. She obtained her PhD at the Faculty of Economics and Political Science, Cairo University in November 2002, to become a professor at the American University since then. In the years 2002–2011, she worked as Associate Professor, Department of Economics, American and British University in Egypt. In 1996–2014, she became a leading expert, chief economist, coordinator, regional director of the World Bank Fund.

In 2015–2019, she worked as Minister of Investment and International Cooperation of the Arab Republic of Egypt. In 2021, she became a professor at the Al-Yamamah University, Saudi Arabia. She also became a board member in the "Egyptian Zakat & Charity House" in 2021 and Helios Fairfax Partners in 2022.
