= Yehia El-Gamal =

Egyptian academic and politician (1930–2016)

- يحيى الجمل

Deputy Prime Minister
- In office 3 March 2011 – June 2011
- Prime Minister: Essam Sharaf
- Succeeded by: Ali El Selmi
- In office January 2011 – March 2011
- Prime Minister: Ahmed Shafik

Minister of State and Administrative Reform
- In office 1974–1975
- Prime Minister: Abd El Aziz Muhammad Hegazi

Personal details
- Born: 15 August 1930 Egypt
- Died: 21 November 2016 (aged 86) Egypt
- Party: Democratic Front Party

Yehia Abdel Aziz Abdel Fatah El-Gamal (Arabic: يحيى عبد العزيز عبد الفتاح الجمل, Egyptian Arabic pronunciation: [ˈjeħjæ ʕæbdelʕæˈziːz ʕæbdelfætˈtæːħ]; 15 August 1930 – 21 November 2016) was an Egyptian lawyer and politician (DFP). From January to July 2011, he was the deputy prime minister of Egypt.

== Early life ==
El Gamal was born on 15 August 1930. He is a classmate of Ahmad Zaki Yamani.

== Political career ==
El Gamal was a minister of state and administrative reform from 1974 to 1975 under the premiership of Abd El Aziz Muhammad Hegazi and the presidency of Anwar Sadat. Since 1975 he has been a professor for constitutional law at the Cairo University. He served as a cultural attaché in Paris during Farouk Hosni's term as minister of culture at the beginning of the 2000s. He was also a member of the People's Assembly.

In 2007, he co-founded the liberal Democratic Front Party. On 29 January 2011, interim Prime Minister Ahmed Shafik made him his deputy. El-Gamal kept his office when Essam Sharaf succeeded Shafik as prime minister on 3 March, and he was sworn in on 7 March. In late June he handed in his resignation, but head of state Mohamed Hussein Tantawi asked him to carry on with his duties. After massive new protests on Tahrir Square in Cairo, El-Gamal resigned on 12 July 2011.

He was an adherent of the National Association for Change which endorsed the candidacy of Mohamed ElBaradei for the 2011 presidential election. In addition, he chaired the National Consensus, a conference that monitored the interim period. Yehia El-Gamal accused Israel of being responsible for the difficulties and conflicts Egypt was facing.

== Law and academic career ==
El Gamal served as visiting professor at different universities, including Kuwait University, Khartoum University, Baghdad University, Rabat University and Georgetown University. He is a member of the board of trustees of the Arab Organization for Human Rights and of the International Court of Arbitration, among the others. In addition, he is a counsel for the Kuwaiti law firm AlBisher Legal.

El Gamal was also practicing attorney of law and head of the El Gamal Law Firm. He died on 21 November 2016.

== Publication ==
El Gamal published several books concerning constitutional and administrative law, contemporary political systems and local government. In addition, he published his memoirs in a book entitled, Kesat Haya Adeyya (An Ordinary Life Story in English). It was first published in 2002 by the El Helal publications. His book was republished in 2011 by the Dar El Shorouk publications.
