= Ashraf Abdelwahab =

Egyptian academic and politician

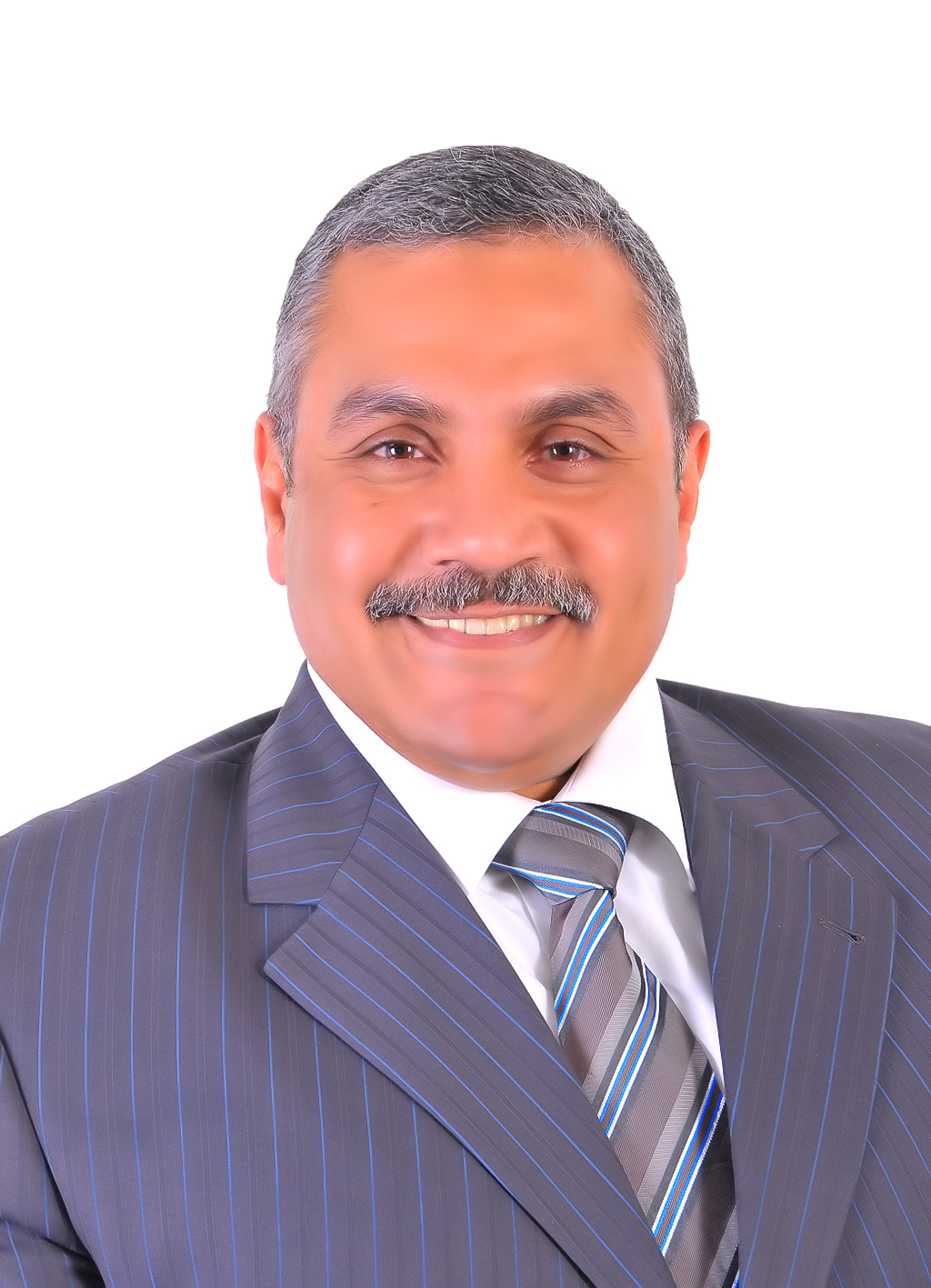
- In office 23 March 2011 – 7 December 2011
- Prime Minister: Essam Sharaf
- In office 7 December 2011 – August 2012
- Prime Minister: Kamal Ganzouri

Ashraf Hassan Abdelwahab (Arabic: أشرف حسن عبدالوهاب) is an Egyptian academic, business executive and politician. He served as the Minister of State for Administrative Development in the cabinets of Essam Sharaf and Kamal Ganzouri from March 2011 to August 2012. Abdelwahab served as Chief Technology Officer for Microsoft, for their Africa initiative, after leading Microsoft's corporate affairs/government relations in the Gulf and North Africa region.

== Early life and education ==
Abdelwahab was born in Egypt and studied in Cairo. In 1983, he received his Bachelor of Science in Electronics and Communications Engineering from Cairo University's Faculty of Engineering. In 1988, he earned his master's degree in Artificial Intelligence and in 1992 received his doctorate in Machine Learning and Evolutionary Algorithms—both from Cairo University.

== Academic career ==
Abdelwahab has taught Computer Engineering Courses in many Egyptian and American Universities, such as Cairo University, Helwan University, University of Louisville, and University of Louisiana at Lafayette. He has published more than 50 papers in national and international journals and conferences in addition to supervising several graduate students in their Masters and PhD theses. In 1984, he joined the Electronic Research Institute, where he was promoted to lead the Artificial Intelligence Group in 2002. Furthermore, since 1986, he gained tremendous industry experience during his work as an IT Consultant at leading IT companies, such as The Egyptian Public Authority for Drainage Projects (EPADP), The Egyptian Ministry of Agriculture, The Egyptian Ministry of Transport, and the Principal Bank for Development and Agricultural Credit.

== Egyptian Ministry of Communications and Information Technology ==
In 2001, before joining the Ministry of State for Administrative Development, Abdelwahab served at the Egyptian Ministry of Communications and Information Technology (MCIT), where he headed the e-government program, as well as the ICT Trust Fund (ICT4D).

== Egyptian Ministry of State ==
In 2004, Abdelwahab joined the Egyptian Ministry of State for Administrative Development (MSAD) as a senior advisor to the Minister. Two years later, Abdelwahab was promoted to the Deputy Minister of State for Administrative Development - where his main role was to formulate the ministry's strategies. After the January 25th revolution, Abdelwahab was assigned to head the ministry of state for administrative development as Acting Minister by Prime Minister Essam Sharaf. During Abdelwahab's tenure as Acting Minister of State, the ministry partnered with UNODC (United Nations Office on Drugs and Crime) to strengthen Egypt's current reporting and complaints mechanisms against corrupted acts. In addition to engaging with Libyan and Tunisian officials in discussing standards for election management, Abdelwahab represented Egypt and MSAD on various committees, conferences and international meetings such as the Public Governance Committee (PGC) of the Organization for Economic Cooperation and Development (OECD). During the 2011 parliamentary elections, Abdelwahab led a team of engineers in creating Egypt's first elections API that allowed voters to search for their assigned voting locations using their national ID in a partnership with Google. The election that followed saw a significant rise in voter turnout. Under Abdelwahab's leadership of the Ministry of State For Administrative Development, the ministry won second place in the UN Public service award for two consecutive years (2011–12).

== Microsoft ==
In 2012, Abdelwahab joined Microsoft as its Corporate Affairs Director for Egypt and North Africa. Afterwards, he was in charge of government relations and corporate affairs for Microsoft Gulf and Egypt. Abdelwahab managed Microsoft's relations with various governments across the Middle East. In 2016, Abdelwahab became Microsoft's Chief Technology Officer for its Microsoft for Africa Initiative.

Political offices	Acting Minister of State For Administrative Development; March 2011-August 2012
