= Mokhtar Khattab =

Egyptian politician

- Occupation: Politician

Mokhtar Khattab is the former Egyptian minister of public enterprise (1999–2004). He was appointed to the board of Telecom Egypt in 2004.
