= Essam Sharaf =

Prime Minister of Egypt from March 2011 to December 2011

- عصام شرف
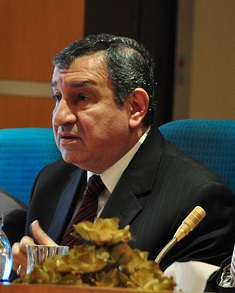
- Sharaf in 2011

50th Prime Minister of Egypt
- In office 3 March 2011 – 7 December 2011
- President: Mohamed Hussein Tantawi (Acting)
- Preceded by: Ahmed Shafik
- Succeeded by: Kamal Ganzouri

Minister of Transportation
- In office 1 June 2004 – 15 December 2005
- Prime Minister: Ahmed Nazif
- Preceded by: Hamdy El Shayeb
- Succeeded by: Mohamed Mansour

Personal details
- Born: 1952 (age 73–74) Giza, Kingdom of Egypt
- Party: National Democratic Party (Before 2005); Independent (2005–present)
- Education: Cairo University; Purdue University

Essam Abdel-Aziz Sharaf (Arabic: عصام عبد العزيز شرف, romanized: ʿIṣṣām ʿAbdu l-ʿAzīz Šaraf, IPA: [ʕeˈsˤɑːm ʕæbdelʕæˈziːz ˈʃɑɾɑf]; born 1952) is an Egyptian academic who was the 50th prime minister of Egypt from 3 March 2011 to 7 December 2011. He served as minister of transportation from 2004 to 2005.

== Early life and education ==
Sharaf was born in Giza in 1952. After receiving his BSc in civil engineering from Cairo University in 1975, he went to Purdue University where he continued his studies, receiving his MSc Eng in 1980 and his PhD in 1984.

== Career ==
Sharaf took a post as a visiting assistant professor at Purdue in 1984 before becoming assistant professor of highway and traffic engineering at Cairo University the following year. In 1990, he was an assistant professor of civil engineering at King Saud University in Saudi Arabia. He returned to Cairo University in 1991, becoming a professor of highway engineering in 1996 while working as senior advisor for the transportation and aviation department in Zuhair Fayez Partnership (ZFP) in Jeddah, Saudi Arabia. Sharaf was the senior advisor to the Egyptian minister of transport in 1999 and the senior technical advisor to the municipality of Al Ain in the UAE in 2003.

He joined the National Democratic Party and became a member of its policy secretariat. He served as Egyptian minister of transportation from 13 July 2004 to 31 December 2005. He resigned due to differences that cropped up between him and Prime Minister Ahmed Nazif. Nazif decided to put the Egypt Engineers Association under state control, a move that meant confiscation of union funds and property by the government. Sharaf later claimed that these events led to the Qalyoub rail accident in 2006.

Following his resignation, Sharaf returned to academia, accepting a post at Cairo University, where he remained a vocal critic of the Mubarak regime, particularly with respect to its handling of Egypt's public transportation infrastructure. During this time he also served as an advisor to Dubai's Roads and Transport Authority, and established the Egypt Scientific Society together with Mohamed ElBaradei, Ahmed Zewail and other Egyptian scientists.

=== 2011 events ===
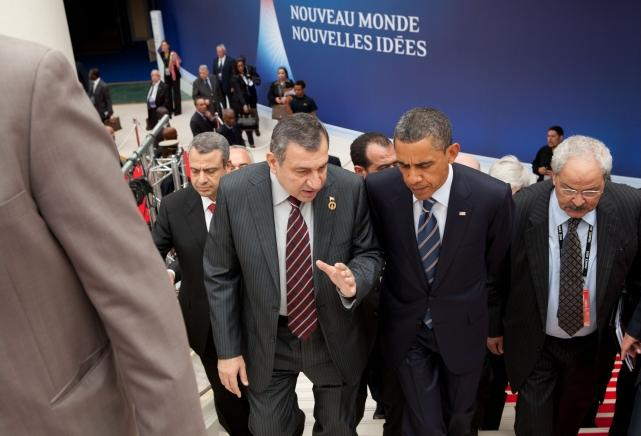
Sharaf with President of the United States, Barack Obama

Sharaf was present and active at the Tahrir square protests during the 2011 Revolution, which endeared him to the leaders of the democracy movement and led them to suggest his name to the Military Council as a possible replacement for Prime Minister Ahmed Shafik.

He was asked by Egypt's governing military council to form a government on 3 March 2011, following Shafik's resignation. On 4 March, he addressed crowds of pro-democracy activists at Tahrir Square shortly after Friday prayers, an unusual move for an Egyptian politician. Sharaf appeared on stage with Mohamed Beltagy, a Muslim Brotherhood leader. In his speech he said "I draw my legitimacy from you" and reiterated his commitment to democratic transition, but pleaded for patience. It is noted that he is the first Egyptian prime minister to give a monthly State-of-the-Union address (since Aziz Sedki 1972-1973).

== Premiership ==
Sharaf was appointed prime minister on 3 March 2011, being the first post-revolution premier of Egypt and replaced Ahmad Shafiq in the post. Although Sharaf was suggested for the premiership by the crowds in Tahrir square, by the end of his term it was largely viewed as anti-revolutionary. During the first couple of months, he removed some very unpopular members of his cabinet, including Foreign Minister Ahmed AbulGheit, dissolved the unpopular and corrupt local and municipal councils, and enacted a series of decisions and policies that were met with fanfare. Even on the personal level, he was a media and street darling. He was even pictured with Egyptians eating the cheap Egyptian national dish "Fuul" (fava beans) in a simple restaurant with his family, his son paid a traffic ticket rather than evading it as he could have, and other similar stories of a simple and humble demeanor flooded the social networks and street talk. He was later blamed for failure to properly address a number of incidents that are crucial to national security such as the worsening security issues, reforming the security apparatus, sectarian violence, solving workers' pay grievances or reforming corrupt national media. His government had mandated a number of laws that were controversial, such as Anti-assembly and Anti-strike laws.

=== Cabinet ===
During the first formation of the cabinet, he removed some very unpopular members of his cabinet, including Foreign Minister Ahmed AbulGheit, inducted many of figures who were traditionally in the opposition during the Mubarak Era, such as minister of tourism Mounir Fakhry Abdel Nour and minister of Social Solidarity and Justice, Gouda Abdel Khalek but retaining many ministers of the last cabinet such as Hassan Younes, minister of Electricity and Power, Fayza AboulNaga, Minister of Planning and International Cooperation.

Under the pressure of sit-ins in Tahrir Square calling for speedier reforms, he was forced to shuffle his cabinet accepting as many as four resignation from ministers associated with the pre-revolution era, including his deputy renowned lawmaker, Yehia El-Gamal. Sharaf appointed veteran economist Hazem Beblawi and Ali El Selmy, a leader of the liberal Wafd party, as deputy prime ministers on 17 July 2011. Beblawi, a former undersecretary of the UN's Economic and Social Commission for Western Asia, was assigned the economic policy in the new cabinet, while El Selmy was assigned the country's "democratic transition".

=== Executive power struggle ===
As time progressed, it became apparent to Sharaf and the Egyptian public that full power resided in the Supreme Council of the Armed Forces (SCAF). It had always been the dominant force in Egyptian politics, rather than the head of government. Sharaf's cabinet was laden with remnants of the Mubarak era, ministers he was still incapable of removing without SCAF support. As the transitional period became prolonged, public demands became even more vocal and he faced accusations ranging from not doing enough, being inactive and complacent, to accusations of being a counter-revolutionary. The transitional government and the SCAF were neither intended as a long-term legislative body, nor was it imbued with the popular mandate to govern beyond the deconstruction of the Mubarak state, restoring public order, and drafting a new constitution that would lead Egypt into its second republic. Instead, Sharaf and the SCAF engaged in debates and policy-making on far-reaching matters such as minimum wage law, progressive taxation and briefly reviewing the terms of the Camp David Accords As reports came out that the SCAF had refused the resignation of unpopular ministers in the cabinet, including Sharaf himself as many as eight times. Sharaf's leadership was largely viewed as that of a figurehead acting on the SCAF's orders rather than having any true political power.

=== Policy reform ===
==== Security reform ====
Sharaf's greatest problem appeared to be reforming the country's security apparatus, which appeared to be more complex of a task that will require more time than what was demanded by the people. Although, he removed as many as 300 high-ranking officers, his greatest challenge was to dismantle the notorious and deeply entrenched State Security apparatus. But activists later claimed that same tactics were used against them and claimed that the only change was its name to "National Security".

==== Media reform ====
Although initially abolishing the Ministry of Media in his first cabinet, he appointed a new minister, Ossama Heikal in his cabinet shuffle, with a role to reform and reorganize the corrupt and the largely controlled state-media. However, Ossama came under heavy fire from activists and private media for his not-so-different coverage of different issues including the deadly Maspiro Incident, an incident for which he later came under criminal investigation for instigating violence against the protesters as well as spreading false media reports.

==== Social reform ====
During his tenure, the first trade union for farmers in Egypt was established and he participated in the formal opening of the first conference to be held in order to encourage farmers to join the union.

==== Financial reform ====
During his term, The Cabinet approved the draft decree-law to open an additional appropriation in the State budget for the current financial year 2010/2011 is estimated ten billion pounds to face additional requirements to support the supply of goods. He issued a decree establishing a fund to finance factories suspended from work in order to prevent leakage of employment. Ministry of Finance announced a tax reform package soon to support the wage policies and the reform of wage structure of the main priorities of the government in the current stage. The Investment Authority launches a new package of concessions designed to encourage investors and attract new investments to Egypt during the coming period which was approved by the Prime Minister on the investment projects of the Egyptians working in Saudi Arabia.

==== Foreign affairs ====
During his term, Sharaf created a new office: the deputy foreign minister for African affairs in the Ministry of Foreign Affairs, in order to support the political atmosphere in Egypt to expand cooperation with African countries in various fields in an attempt to cure problems and tension in the Egyptian-African relations. Sharaf visited Ethiopia which resulted in Ethiopia announcing "new page" with Egypt on the Nile to ask a different kind of dialogue and cooperation, away from the previous round, which saw a tension between the two countries on the rights and uses in the waters of the Nile. Sharaf visited Sudan and agreed during this visit that Sudan was to plant 100 thousand acres in the Sudan as a first stage up to one million acres, to achieve food security for both Egypt and Sudan.

=== Sectarian violence ===
During his term, a number of sectarian incidents flared up and he was largely seen as unable to respond. A number of churches were burned down, including a major incident in a Cairo neighborhood in May 2011, Imbaba over what was later revealed as the kidnapping of a Christian woman who had left her Christian husband and embraced Islam and married a Muslim man. It was told that she was held against her will and her Muslim husband had gathered a number of other men and went to the church demanding her release. The situation escalated into gunshots and later into the burning of the church.

During violence that erupted in October 2011 near the National TV Building, known as the Maspiro Incident, Sharaf failed to resolve demonstrations that left at least 24 dead. Prior to the incident, there were protests in Cairo against an attack on a church in Aswan province a week earlier. It was later revealed by a member of his advisory committee who had resigned after the incident, that it was suggested to him to deal with the grievances put forward by Egyptian Copts as well as human rights and civil liberties activists to prevent escalation, which included sacking the Aswan governor, who commended the individuals who tore down the "illegal" church building as well as encouraging the attackers instead for calling for their trial. During the incident, the National TV was blamed to incite the public against the Coptic community even to the point of imploring "good" citizens to "save" the security forces against the violent "Coptic" demonstrators. The protest which began as a unity march by largely coptic protesters and some Muslims, turned into full-scale riots.

=== Unamendable Constitution Articles Draft Law ===
During the final two months of his term, he along with his deputy, Dr. Ali ElSelmy came under fire from almost all of the political forces due to a law draft that provides a framework for the much anticipated constitution, aiming at preserving civil liberties and a democratic form of government. The articles in the paper were to be binding in the drafting of the constitution as entrenched clauses, that cannot be amended. The drafted paper was controversial for two different sets of reasons for the different political parties; For the right-wing Islamist parties, they feared for relinquishing any control of the powers of the next parliament including full power for forming the drafting convention who will write up the constitution, in addition to giving the army the power to "preserve the country's form of democracy", which was too vague for the Islamist parties and appeared as opening the way for the power of the army to legally oust an elected parliament or government if its tendencies didn't meet the army's approval. As for the liberal and left-wing parties who were mostly content with the army's proposed new role, had other fears that the army is placing itself outside of the parliament's reach by giving itself full autonomy over the military budget, barring its military sales and deals from elected officials and even mandating the power of declaring war by the army's military council rather than the parliament. A final decision on the drafted law is yet to be taken, as the political appear divided over their stances, and despite outcries, Dr ElSelmy has stated that the document remains on the table.

=== Revolution victims incident ===
After a massive demonstration in Tahrir Square on 18 November 2011 by mostly Islamist parties in refusal for what's been known to the media as the "ElSelmy Document", families of those who died or were injured in the course of violence of the police during the revolution decided to organize a sit-in in the square due to the lack of financial or moral support from the government. Some liberal and leftist movements symbolically joined the sit-in. The following day, the security forces attacked the protesters in an attempt to break up the sit-in. News and images circulating through social media showed the police attempt to be excessively violent. As more and more activists joined the protesters, violence erupted once again in the square. For the following five days, the violence continued with images every day showing police shooting at protesters, usage of tear gas that had left at least 41 dead and as many as 1,000 injured with gunshot wounds or tear gas suffocation. Activists seemed surprised by the return of violence by the police forces and scores of citizens joined them in the streets by the images of the violence, which many have dubbed "The true second revolution".

During the outburst of the worst clashes violence since January, Sharaf again failed to address the problem directly and was unable to control or stop the aggression of security forces on the protesters. With the scores of dead and injured protesters, he along with the Minister of Interior appeared unable to defuse the situation. In an attempt to calm the public, Sharaf turned to protesters, asking them to leave the square to allow normality without addressing grievances that excessive force was used in breaking up the sit-in. With the inability to control the violence, the cabinet's failure to react and stop the violence by the police or convince the protesters to calm down. With the minister of interior, Mansour el-Essawy, appearing on an interview on National Television saying that he'd relinquished control of the security forces to an army general for the last two days, and the ministry of culture, Emad Abu Ghazi resigning, it appeared that the cabinet was falling apart and this last outburst of violence was the final nail in Sharaf's premiership's coffin.

=== Resignation ===
Unable to withstand the pressure, he submitted his resignation to SCAF on 21 November 2011, just 6 days ahead of the much anticipated 2011–12 Egyptian parliamentary election. The resignation was accepted the next day but his cabinet continued in a caretaker capacity until his successor, later revealed as Kamal Ganzouri was to be named. Officially, his last day as Prime minister was on 2 December 2011, when Ganzouri's cabinet negotiations were concluded.

== Political views ==
Sharaf is noted for strongly opposing normalization of ties with Israel. He considers the resolution of the Israeli–Palestinian conflict to be a prerequisite to cooperation between the two states.

== Awards ==
- The State Encouragemental Prize in Engineering Sciences from the Academy of Scientific Research and Technology in 1987 and 1997
- First Class Medal of Excellence from the President of Egypt Hosni Mubarak in 1995
- Cairo University Incentive Award for Scientific Excellence in Engineering in 1997
- Egyptian State Prize in Engineering Sciences, 1997
- Excellence Award in Engineering from Purdue University, America in 2005
- Man of the Year Award (Rafiq Hariri Award), Beirut in 2006
- Fellow of the Chartered Institute of Logistics and Transport in the UK in 2007
- Certificate of Merit from the Cairo University in the Celebration of Scientists Day in 1988 and 1998
- Member of the National Academy of Engineering in 2020

Political offices
Preceded by Ahmed Shafik	Prime Minister of Egypt; 2011	Succeeded by Kamal Ganzouri
