= Ahmed Darwish (politician) =

Egyptian politician and engineer

Ahmed Mahmoud Darwish
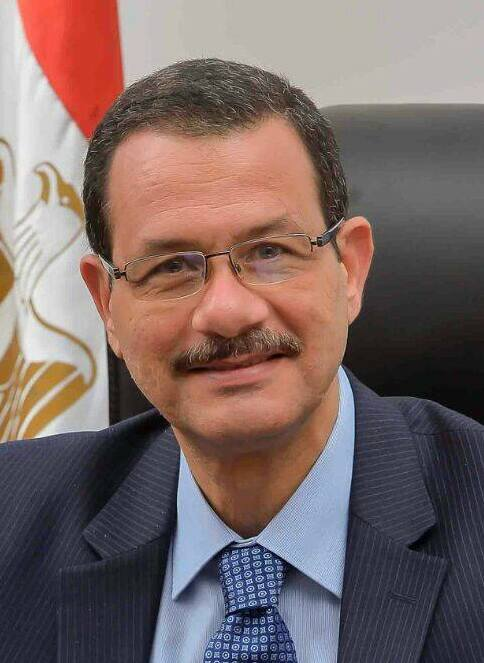

Former Chairman of General Authority of Suez Canal Economic Zone
- In office 2015–2017
- President: Abdel Fattah el-Sisi
- Succeeded by: Mohab Mamish

Ministry of State for Administrative Development
- In office 2004–2011
- Prime Minister: Ahmed Nazif
- Preceded by: Zaki Abu Amer

Personal details
- Born: 25 May 1959 (age 67)
- Education: Cairo University; University of California, Davis

Ahmed Mahmoud Darwish (Arabic: أحمد محمود درويش, born 25 May 1959) is an Egyptian politician. He served as the first Chairman of the General Authority of Suez canal economic zone from 2015 to 2017. He previously served as Minister of State for Administration Development in the Nazif Cabinet between 2004 and 2011.

== Early life and education ==
Ahmed Darwish did his bachelor's and master's degrees in Cairo University in Computer Engineering in 1981 and 1984 respectively. He received his Ph.D. in Electrical and Computer Engineering from the University of California, Davis in 1988. He received Life Time Achievement Medal in Public Service from the university of California, Davis in 2017.

== Academic career ==
Darwish started out his academic career as a Lecturer at the University of California, Davis in 1988 during his Ph.D. studies. After that, he moved back to Cairo in 1989, where he joined the Computer Engineering Department, Cairo University as an Assistant Professor before moving up the ranks and being promoted to Associate Professor then Professor in 1994 and 1999 respectively.

Darwish continued his role as a professor in Cairo University in absentia during his term as a minister of state and his term with the General Authority of Suez Canal Economic Zone.

== As a Minister of State ==
Darwish was appointed in the cabinet of Ahmed Nazif in 2004 as a minister of state for administrative development tasked with developing the government's electronic services and institutionalizing governance policies. During his tenure as a Minister of State for Administrative Development, he was awarded the 2007 Middle East Eminent Persons from Singapore. The entire Nazif Cabinet resigned with the orders of then-president Hosni Mubarak as part of the political concessions done during the 2011 Egyptian revolution.

== Heading the Suez Canal Economic Zone ==
In November 2015, Darwish was appointed by the Egyptian president Abdel Fattah el-Sisi to serve as the chairman of the new flagship project that aims at revitalizing the Suez Canal area by constructing a 461 square kilometres across the three Suez Canal governorates of Suez, Port Said and Ismailiya, and will include six maritime ports, to be completed by 2045.

During her tenure, the Suez Canal Economic Zone is reported to have attracted investments for 30 different logistical projects amounting to 20 million US Dollars.

In April 2017, A presidential decree was issued replacing Darwish with Mohab Mamish who is also serving as the chairman of the Suez Canal Authority at that time.

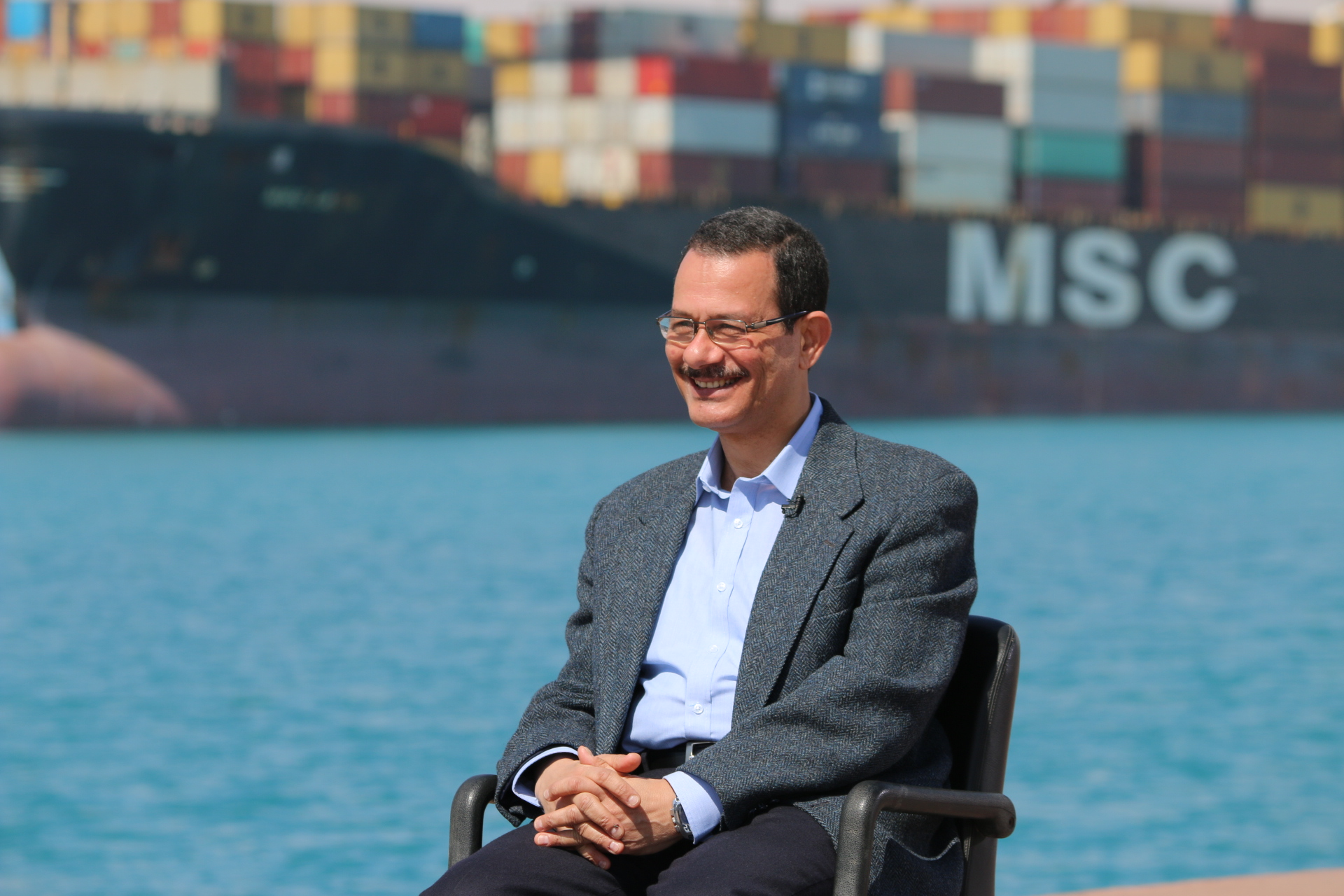
Ahmed Darwish as the chairman of the Suez Canal Economic Zone in 2017

== Consultancy & Business advisor ==
Ahmed Darwish serves on the board of advisors in various companies including the government-affiliated Egyptian National Competitiveness Council, Banque Du Caire, Bibliotheca Alexandrina School of Business at the American University in Cairo and the investment company 138 Pyramids. Darwish was an international consultant to several companies and banks such as Microsoft and Egyptian International Petroleum Company.

== Personal life ==
Ahmed Darwish was born and raised in Cairo, Egypt. He is married and has two children.
