= Maged A. Abdelaziz =

Egyptian diplomat

UN Secretary-General’s Special Adviser on Africa
- In office 2012–2017

Permanent Representative of Egypt to the United Nations
- Incumbent
- Assumed office January 2005

Personal details
- Born: 1954 (age 71–72)
- Children: 1 daughter

Maged A. Abdelaziz (born 1954) was the United Nations Secretary-General's Special Adviser on Africa at the level of Under-Secretary-General between 2012 and 2017. He was an Egyptian diplomat who had been Egypt's Permanent Representative to the United Nations since January 2005. He is married and has one daughter.
