= Ministry of Planning, Economic Development & International Cooperation (Egypt) =

Government ministry of Egypt

Ministry of Planning and Economic Development (Egypt)
- وزارة التعاون الدولي

Agency overview
- Jurisdiction: Government of Egypt
- Headquarters: New Administrative Capital, Cairo Governorate
- Agency executive: Ahmed Rostom, Minister
- Website: mped.gov.eg/home?lang=en

The Ministry of Planning and Economic Development is the ministry in charge of economic cooperation and development between the Arab Republic of Egypt and the Arab states, foreign countries, and international and regional organizations. It also aids in economic and social development within Egypt. Its headquarters are located in New Administrative Capital.

== Profile ==
The Ministry of International Cooperation was merged with the Ministry of Investment in September 2017. It is active in developing financial inclusion policy and is a member of the Alliance for Financial Inclusion. In late 2016, the ministry talked of receiving 120 million euros from the European Union for services to help the economically disadvantaged, for example, to expand the number of children receiving school meals, to aid families running small businesses, and to assist youth with employment skills.

== Milestones ==
On 2 August 2017, the Minister, Sahar Nasar, reported that foreign investment in Egypt would exceed $10 Billion (US dollars). In 2016 Egyptian president Abdel Fattah el-Sisi had moved to float the Egyptian pound and this resulted in lower costs for doing business in Egypt.

In 2018, the Minister announced that Egypt is working to diversify foreign investment stressing several times that the goal is to create jobs. Nasr stated Egypt is working to attract investments from Europe and the US, and continues improvements in cutting red tape when doing business in Egypt. Nasr talked about the improved social stability and Egypt's focus on developing Sinai as a way of countering extremism.

Nasr announced that as of August 2018, sole proprietors can license their company's thanks to improvements made to Egypt's Company's Law and described the limited tax liability benefits to those Small and Medium-sized Enterprises.

== Ministers ==
- Fayza Aboulnaga, 2007
- Fayza Aboulnaga (As Minister of Planning and International Cooperation) 2011 — 2012.
- Naglaa El-Ahwany, 17 June 2014 — 2015
- Sahar Nasr, 15 September 2015 — 2019
- Rania El-Mashat, 22 December 2019 — 10 February 2026.
- Ahmed Rostom, 10 February 2026 — Present

== See also ==
- Cabinet of Egypt
- Egypt Vision 2030
