= 'Ali Ashraf =

Persian painter (c.1735–c.1780)

- علی اشرف
- Born: fl c. 1735; Urmia, Safavid Iran (now Iran)
- Died: fl c. 1780; Afsharid Iran (now Iran)
- Other name: Ali Ashraf Naqqash Avshar
- Occupation: Painter
- Known for: Lacquer painting, Persian miniatures

'Ali Ashraf (Persian: علی اشرف; fl c. 1735–1780), was a Persian lacquer painter and miniaturist, active during the Afsharid and Zand eras. He was known for his lacquer painted Islamic pencil boxes (Persian: قلمدان, romanized: qalamdan, lit. 'pencil case'), lacquer painted mirror frames, and his use of the Persian flower and bird motifs (Persian: گل و مرغ, romanized: Gol o bolbol).

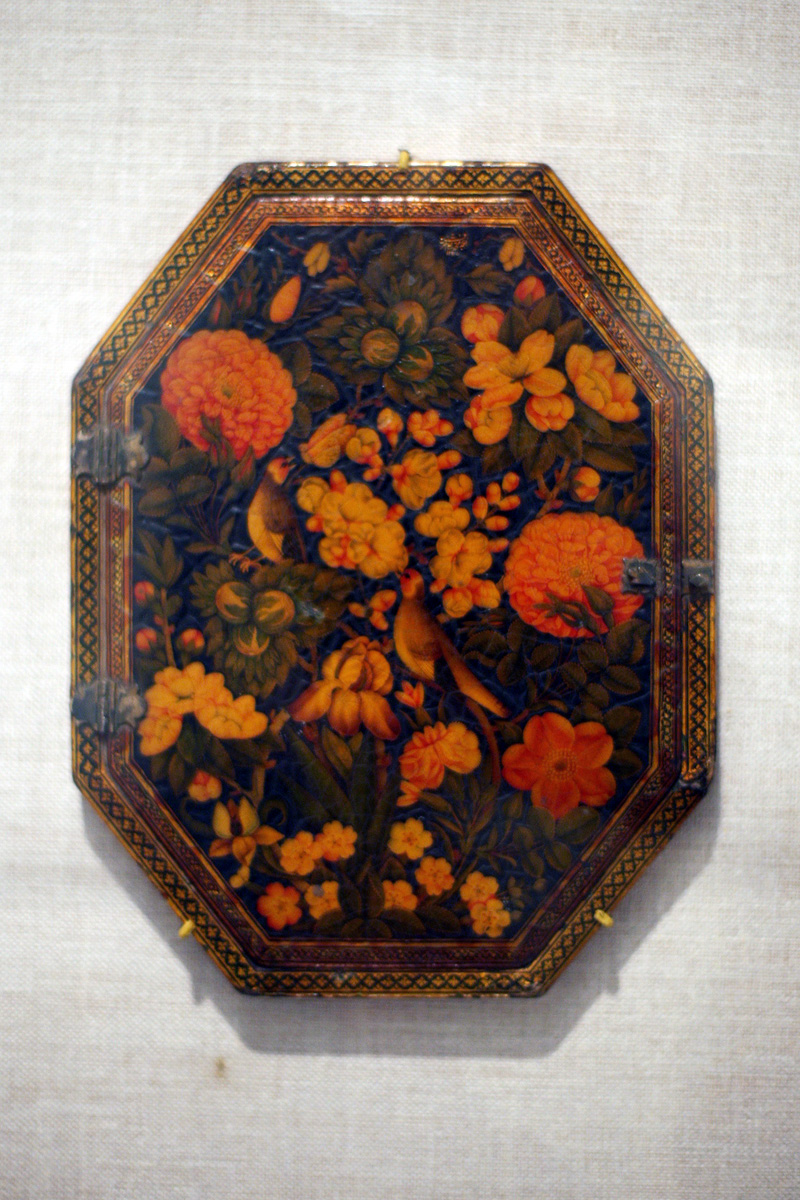
'Ali Ashraf's lacquer painted Persian mirror case

He was trained under Mohammad Zaman. His work is included in museum collections, including the Metropolitan Museum of Art, the Victoria and Albert Museum in London, and the Brooklyn Museum.

== See also ==
- List of Iranian artists
