= Mahmoud Mohieldin =

Egyptian professor

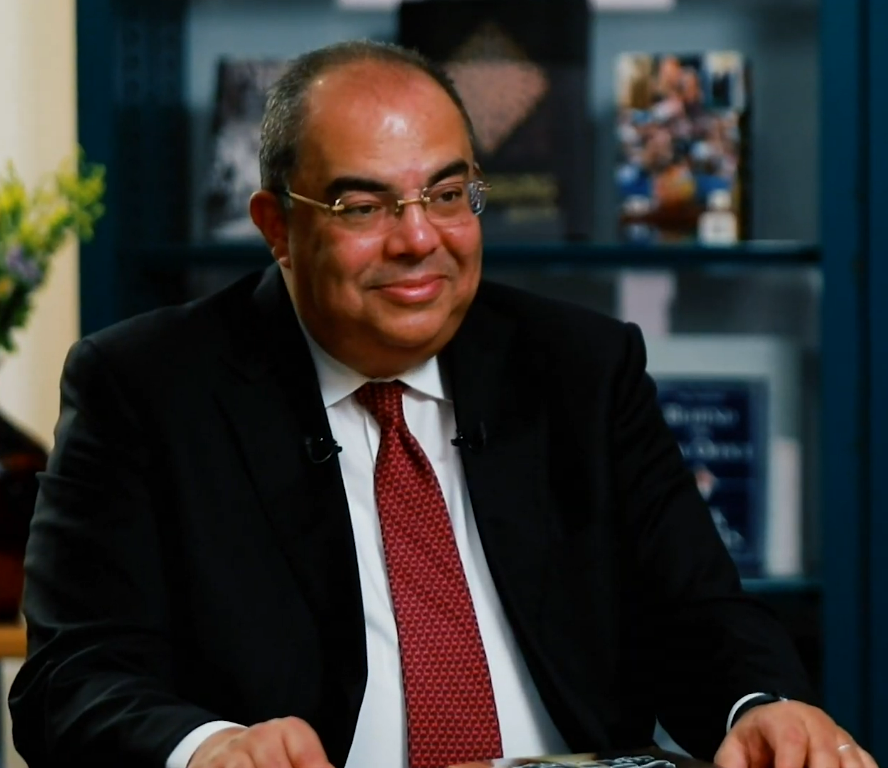

Minister of Investment
- In office 2004–2010
- President: Hosni Mubarak
- Prime Minister: Ahmed Nazif

Personal details
- Born: January 15, 1965 (age 61) Cairo
- Party: Independent
- Education: Cairo University; University of York; University of Warwick

Mahmoud Mohieldin, (born 15 January 1965 in Egypt) is an Egyptian economist with more than 30 years of experience in international finance and development. He is the UN Climate Change High-Level Champion for Egypt. He is an Executive Director at the International Monetary Fund. He has been the United Nations Special Envoy on Financing the 2030 Sustainable Development Agenda since February 2020.

He was the Minister of Investment of Egypt from 2004-2010, and most recently, served as the World Bank Group Senior Vice President for the 2030 Development Agenda, United Nations Relations and Partnerships. His roles at the World Bank also included Managing Director, responsible for Human Development, Sustainable Development, Poverty Reduction and Economic Management, Finance and Private Sector Development, and the World Bank Institute; World Bank President's Special Envoy on the Millennium Development Goals (MDGs), the Post-2015 Development Agenda (later, the Sustainable Development Goals (SDGs)), and Financing for Development; and Corporate Secretary and Executive Secretary to the Development Committee of the World Bank Group's Board of Governors.

Dr Mohieldin also served on several Boards of Directors in the Central Bank of Egypt and the corporate sector. He was a member of the Commission on Growth and Development and was selected for the Young Global Leader of the World Economic Forum in 2005. His professional experience extends into the academic arena as a Professor of Economics and Finance at the Faculty of Economics and Political Science, Cairo University and as a visiting professor at several renowned Universities in Egypt, Korea, the UAE, the UK and the USA. He is a member of the International Advisory Board of Durham University Business School. He also holds leading positions in national, regional and international research centres and associations. He has authored numerous publications and articles in leading journals in the fields of economics, finance and development.

== Education ==
Mohieldin holds a PhD in economics from the University of Warwick, UK; a master's degree in economics and social policy analysis from the University of York, UK; a diploma of development economics from the University of Warwick; and a B.Sc. in economics from Cairo University. He also participated in executive programs at Wharton Business School of the University of Pennsylvania, the MIT and Georgetown University. In 2018, the American University in Cairo conferred upon him the honorary degree of doctor of Humane Letters “ “in recognition of renowned attainments and achievements”.

== Early career ==
Dr Mohieldin started his career as a lecturer in financial economics at the Faculty of Economics and Political Science of Cairo University. He then took on the position of director of the Macroeconomic and Debt Analysis Unit in the Office of the Minister of State for International Cooperation from 1995 until 1996. In 1996, he became an economic advisor in the Office of the Minister of State for Economic Affairs. In 1997, he became senior advisor to the Minister of Economy and in 1999, became senior advisor to the Minister of Economy and Foreign Trade. In 2001, he moved to the Ministry of Foreign Trade as a senior advisor to the minister. In 2004, he was appointed Minister of Investment.

Mohieldin also served as a member of the board of directors of the Central Bank of Egypt (1999–2004); a member of the board of directors of HSBC-Egypt; a member of the board of directors of Telecom Egypt; and a member of the board of directors of the Egyptian Diplomatic Institute at the Ministry of Foreign Affairs of Egypt. Mohieldin was also an advisor to the Egyptian Centre for Economic Studies and the director of Cairo Economics and Finance.

== Academia ==
Mohieldin has been teaching various graduate and undergraduate courses since 1986, focusing on economics and finance at the department of economics, Faculty of Economics and Political Science at Cairo University. At the postgraduate level, he taught international finance and advanced macroeconomic theory and policy. He taught the economics of money and banking and financial markets, Microeconomic Theory and Macroeconomic Theory at the undergraduate level. He also supervises and examines post-graduate and PhD students. He is currently a visiting professor at Durham Business School. Mohieldin is also a member of the advisory board of the Durham Business School.

He was also an active faculty member, as coordinator of the Economic Dialogue Forum and founder of the Model Egyptian Stock Exchange (MESE), which, since its commencement, has become one of the biggest and most successful events in the Faculty of Economics and Political Science in Cairo University and many other universities in Egypt. Mohieldin also founded and supervised the Economists' Society at the Faculty of Economics and Political Science.

While studying at the University of Warwick (1992–1995), he was an active student as a coordinator of the Graduate Students-Staff Liaison Committee, Department of Economics; chairman of the Cultural Committee of the General Association of Egyptian Students in the UK; undergraduate economics tutor; and development economics tutor, and a co-founder of the Economic Society.

== Ministry of Investment ==
Mohieldin was appointed Minister of Investment upon its establishment in 2004. The ministry was established with a mandate to reform the investment climate in Egypt, further develop non-bank financial services, and introduce a comprehensive Asset Management Program for State-Owned Enterprises (SOEs). He led a comprehensive structural and regulatory reform program to modernize and liberalize the Egyptian economy in those three critical areas – leveraging private investment for growth and job creation; enhancing access to non-bank financial services; and implementing a successful asset management program of public enterprises.

=== Private investment ===
Mohieldin's legislative and institutional reforms, affected both domestic investments and FDI inflows. Between 2004–05 and 2006–07, private sector investments grew at an average annual rate of 40% and FDI inflows increased from $2 billion in 2004 50 $13.2 billion in 2008. As a result of his leadership, Egypt was named Top Reformer for four years in the Doing Business Report and was the top regional recipient of foreign direct investment.

=== Financial services and corporate governance ===
Mohieldin has implemented the following regulatory reforms:

- Created the Egyptian Financial Supervisory Authority (EFSA), a single regulator for the non-bank financial sector.
- Built the Nile Stock Exchange (NILEX), a stock market for small and medium-sized enterprises;
- Created the first institute of directors in the Arab World.
- Developed an environmental, social and governance index with Standard & Poor's for companies listed on the Egyptian Exchange (S&P/EGX ESG Index).
- Developed the first Arabic Code of Conduct for corporate governance and introduced guidelines for corporate social responsibility.
- Consolidated and liberalized the insurance sector and enhanced its regulatory framework.
- Developed the mortgage finance market and launched Egypt's first liquidity facility for a mortgage refinance.

These reforms helped the non-bank financial services industry to accommodate new products and allowed Egypt to become the regional center for financial services at the time.

=== Asset management program ===
By adopting a comprehensive asset management program, the Ministry of Investment, under the leadership of Mohieldin, eliminated the £E32 million debt of State-Owned Enterprises, and brought it to zero; its net assets went from negative to positive. By 2007/08, the portfolio was generating a profit of £E5.1 billion. The ministry also significantly enhanced the corporate governance of SOEs.

== World Bank Group ==
Mohieldin joined the bank in October 2010 as managing director. As managing director, Mohieldin oversaw the networks responsible for human development, sustainable development, poverty reduction and economic management, finance and private sector development, the World Bank Institute, largely responsible for knowledge building and sharing, as well as improving cross-network collaboration. Areas of work also included the Millennium Development Goals, cooperatives, Islamic finance, migration, public-private partnerships, financial inclusion, as well as guidance and support on the World Bank's World Development Reports. Mohieldin also served as the World Bank deputy to the G20.

In January 2013, he became the president's special envoy on the Millennium Development Goals, the Post-2015 Development Agenda, and Financing for Development. His primary responsibilities were to act as the focal point on discussions related to the post-2015 agenda (later, the sustainable development goals), to support the framing of the agenda, support the acceleration of the MDGs, and improve coordination with the Multilateral Development Banks. A key initiative was the adoption of an MDG acceleration framework by the UN Chief Executives Board (CEB), which was rooted in enhanced collaboration between all agencies to address key bottlenecks in selected countries. His work also entailed strengthening the relationship between the World Bank and the United Nations.

In April 2014, in addition to his responsibilities as the president's special envoy, he was appointed as corporate secretary and executive secretary to the development committee of the World Bank Group's board of governors. As corporate secretary, Mohieldin's role was to act as the key interlocutor between the management of the World Bank and the board of executive directors. During his tenure, he managed and ensured the success of several important decisions, including the 2015 shareholding review, the fast-track approval of loans related to Ebola, as well as the implementation of reforms.

In January 2016, he took on his current role of senior vice president for the 2030 development agenda, UN Relations and Partnerships. This includes overseeing the World Bank offices in New York and Geneva. His unit is responsible for representing the World Bank in discussions related to the Sustainable Development Goals and 2030 Agenda for Sustainable Development. It is also responsible for representing the World Bank at the United Nations. An important work stream is to ensure the effective alignment of the SDGs to the work of the World Bank. Mohieldin has also played a key role in strengthening the relationship between the UN system and the World Bank.

== International recognition ==
For the fourth time in five years, Egypt was named one of the top 10 global reformers, and the top regional reformer in the annual “Doing Business” report of 2010 that is prepared by the World Bank and International Finance Corporation (IFC). Egypt was the first Arab and African country to join the investment committee of the Organisation for Economic Co-operation and Development (OECD) as a participant, the lead FDI recipient country in Africa, and second among the Arab countries in United Nations Conference on Trade and Development (UNCTAD) 2007 'World Investment Report.'

== Affiliation and membership of professional and academic societies ==
Mohieldin has held numerous leading positions in think tanks, research centres and academic institutions all over the world. Among these positions has been serving as a member of the Commission on Growth and Development since 2005, alongside several high-profile figures including the likes of Nobel laureates in Economics Michael Spence and Robert Solow. In 2008, Mohieldin became the chair of the advisory board for the Global Emerging Markets Local Currency Bonds Program (GEMLOC). He has been a senior research associate of the Economic Research Forum of the Arab Countries, including Iran and Turkey]; and a member of the Middle East Studies Association of North America. Mohieldin is a Fellow of the British Society for Middle Eastern Studies in the United Kingdom; and a member of the Egyptian Society for Political Economy in Cairo. He has been an active board member at Benha University, Egypt; the Arab Society for Economic Research; the Centre of European Studies; and the Centre for Economic and Financial Research and Studies at the Faculty of Economics and Political Science of Cairo University, Egypt.

== Previous appointments ==
Mohieldin also served as a member of the board of directors of the Central Bank of Egypt; a member of the board of directors of HSBC-Egypt; a member of the board of directors of Telecom Egypt; and a member of the board of directors of the Egyptian Diplomatic Institute at the Ministry of Foreign Affairs of Egypt. Mohieldin was also an advisor to the Egyptian Centre for Economic Studies and the director of Cairo Economics and Finance. In 1999 Mohieldin represented the Egyptian Government in the G33 Meetings. Other memberships and appointments he held included: a member of the executive committee of the Cairo Centre for Economic Information; member of the Appeal Committee of the Capital Market Authority; economic advisor for the Egyptian Arab African Bank; member of the Appeal Committee of the Capital Market Authority; economic consultant to the Periodic Magazine Al-Benouk; published by the League of Egyptian Banks; and chairman of the Cultural Committee of the General Association of Egyptian Students in the United Kingdom.

== Academic awards ==
Mohieldin received the Certificate of Merit, Leadership Seminar at Georgetown University, in the United States in 2003. In the same year he received the Certificate in Capital Flows, Monetary Policy and International Financial System, World Bank Institute and Federal Reserve Bank of San Francisco. In 2000, he received the Certificate in Housing Finance from Wharton School, University of Pennsylvania in the United States.

== See also ==
- List of Egyptians
