= Ministry of Manpower (Egypt) =

Government ministry of Egypt

Coordinates: 30°4′36″N 31°18′53″E

Arab Republic of Egypt Ministry of Manpower
- وزارة القوى العاملة
- Emblem of Egypt

Agency overview
- Jurisdiction: Egypt
- Headquarters: Nasr City, Cairo
- Agency executive: Mohamed Safaan, Minister
- Website: Official website

The Ministry of Manpower is the ministry in charge of manpower, labor relations and emigration of Egyptian workers.

== Profile ==
The ministry's headquarters is in Cairo. The Minister of Manpower and Immigration also chairs the higher committee for migration that was established in 1977.

Aside from accounting for workers returning from Gulf states, the agency keeps a list with the names of companies where Egyptian nationals are prohibited to work.

== Ministers ==
Aisha Abdel Hadi served between 2005 and 2011.

In June 2014, Nahed Ashri was assigned the post of minister. In September 2015, Gamal Sorour was assigned to the post.

On 23 March 2016 Mohamed Safaan was appointed Minister of Manpower.

== See also ==
- Cabinet of Egypt
