= Faiza Abou el-Naga =

Egyptian politician

- Born: 12 November 1951; Port Said, Egypt
- Citizenship: Egypt
- Occupation: Politician
- Employer: Government of Egypt
- Known for: Government Minister, National security adviser
- Political party: National Democratic Party

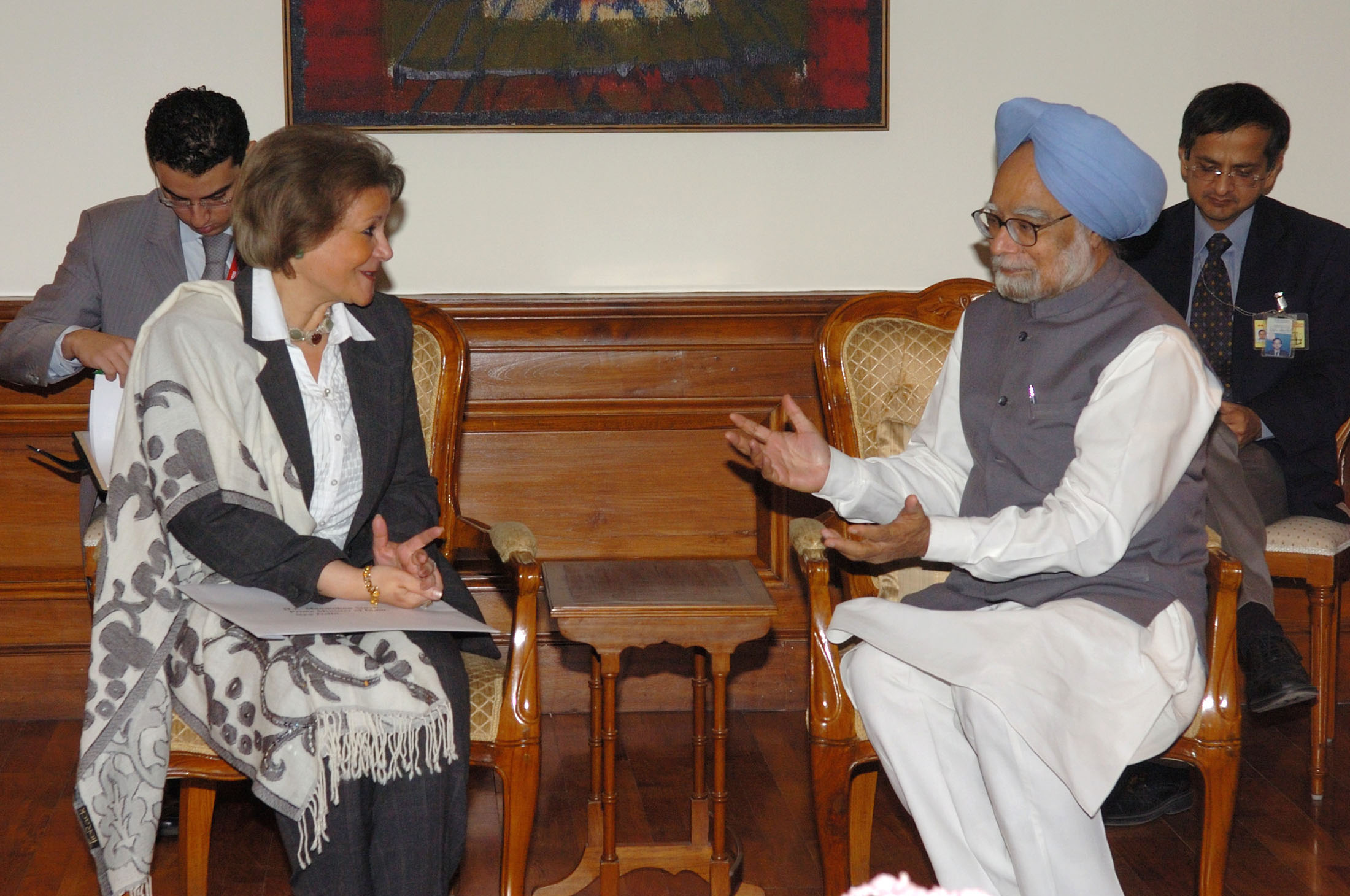
Fayza Abou El Naga meeting with the Prime Minister, Dr. Manmohan Singh, in New Delhi on April 09, 2008.

Faiza Abou el-Naga is an Egyptian politician who was born on 12 November 1951 in Port Said, Egypt and served as minister of planning and international cooperation of Egypt during the Mubarak era and the transition period. She was appointed as Egypt's national security advisor by President Abdel Fattah El Sisi.

== Career and activities ==
Abou el-Naga was the minister of planning and international cooperation in the cabinet led by Ahmed Nazif. She retained her post in the preceding cabinets. She was a member of the National Democratic Party and served in its policy secretariat.

It was reported that Naga was the principal instigator of the action taken on 6 February 2012 to criminally charge 43 members of non-governmental organizations in Egypt with operating without required licenses, a decision which has seriously strained relations with the United States.

Abou el-Naga said:

But the alleged perpetrators of these dark plots are not shadowy agents of the Central Intelligence Agency, MI6, or even Mossad, as one might suppose she’d say. No, they are by and large an idealistic band of young people from various countries who work for nongovernment organizations attempting to help Egypt build the civil institutions essential for the transition to a functioning democracy.

— The Center for American Progress (CAP), Meet Fayza Abul-Naga, a Woman of Ambition An International Lesson in Political Opportunism, Feb 7, 2012
