= Sherif El-Sherbiny =

Egyptian engineer and politician (born 1982)

- شريف الشربيني

Minister of Housing, Utilities & Urban Communities
- In office July 2024 – 11 February 2026
- President: Abdel Fattah el-Sisi
- Prime Minister: Mostafa Madbouly
- Preceded by: Assem el Gazzar
- Succeeded by: Randa El-Menshawy

Personal details
- Born: 19 July 1982 (age 44)
- Education: Cairo University

Sherif El-Sherbiny (Arabic: شريف الشربيني; born 19 July 1982) is an Egyptian engineer who served as the Minister of Housing, Utilities and Urban Communities succeeding Assem el Gazzar.
