= Subdivisions of Egypt =

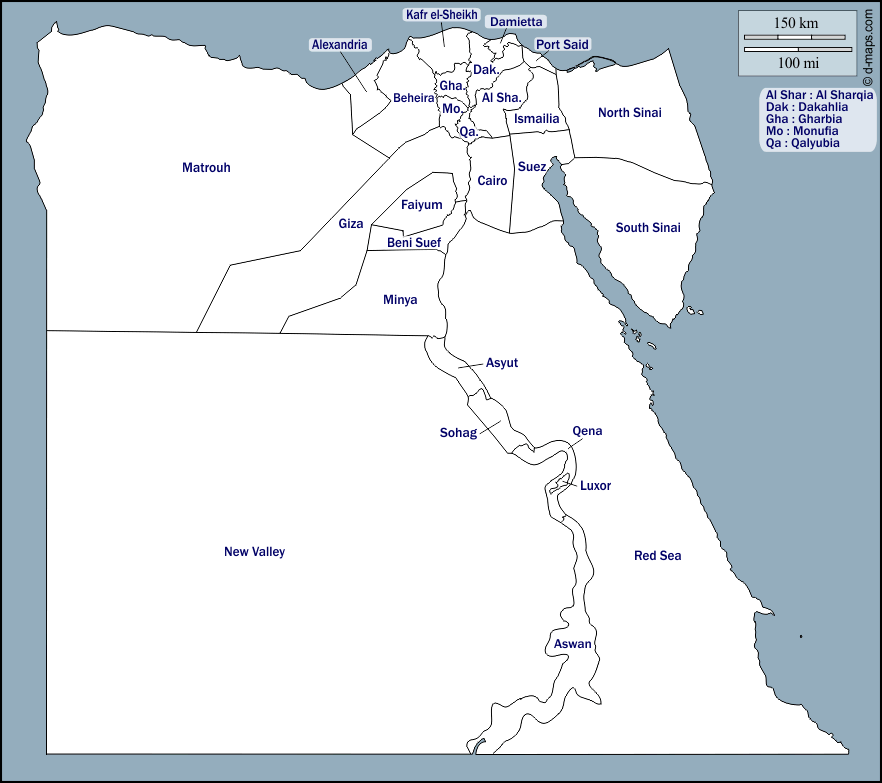
- Location: Egypt

Egypt is administratively organized under a dual system that may consist of either two or three tiers, with further subdivisions occasionally resulting in an additional layer. It follows a centralized system of local government, officially termed local administration, as it functions as a part of the executive branch of the government.

Overall, Egypt is divided into twenty-seven governorates. Each governorate has a capital city, which is further divided into districts, sub-districts, or both. Administrative districts exist in governorates with rural areas. Each district is divided into local units. The capital of the district is its largest town, which is a city. The capital of each local unit is a main village or a city (if the district includes more than one city), followed by a number of smaller villages, which may include hamlets or small settlements. If the district capital is a large city, it is either a sub-district or divided into several sub-districts, each with its own head called the head of the district. If it is a single sub-district, its head is the mayor, and it is divided into several smaller districts or sheikhdoms. The mayor appoints the heads of these smaller districts or sheikhdoms.

Urban governorates, which are not rural, are divided into districts. The governorate itself is a city-state, meaning it is directly under the authority of the governor. Each district is headed by a head of a district. Border or desert governorates are also divided into districts. Each district has a capital city within the governorate, and each district may include a number of small villages. The head of the city, who is appointed directly by the governor, governs each district.

== Overview ==
Egyptian law delineates the units of local governance as governorates, centers, cities, districts, and villages, each possessing legal personality. The legal framework establishes a dual system of local administration that alternates between a two-tier and a three-tier structure, depending on the characteristics of the governorate.

At the top of the hierarchy are 27 governorates (singular: محافظة muḥāfẓa, plural: محافظات muḥāfẓat). Each governorate has a capital, typically its largest city, and is headed by a governor, appointed by the President of Egypt, serving at the president’s discretion.

Governors hold the civilian rank of minister and report directly to the prime minister, who chairs the Council of Governors (maglis al-muhafzin) and convenes regular meetings with them. The Ministry of Local Development is responsible for coordinating the governors and managing their governorates' budgets.

City governorates, whose boundaries largely coincide with those of a major urban center, fall directly under the authority of its governor and are only subdivided into districts (singular: حي ḥay, plural: أحياء aḥya'), each headed by a district head. In Egypt, there are four such governorates, namely the Alexandria Governorate, Cairo Governorate, Port Said Governorate, and Suez Governorate.

The remaining 23 governorates, which encompass both rural and urban areas, operate under a three-tier system that include intermediate municipal units known as centers (singular: مركز markaz, plural: مراكز marakiz). The lowest level of administration is determined by the rural or urban character of the settlement, classified as either a city or a village.

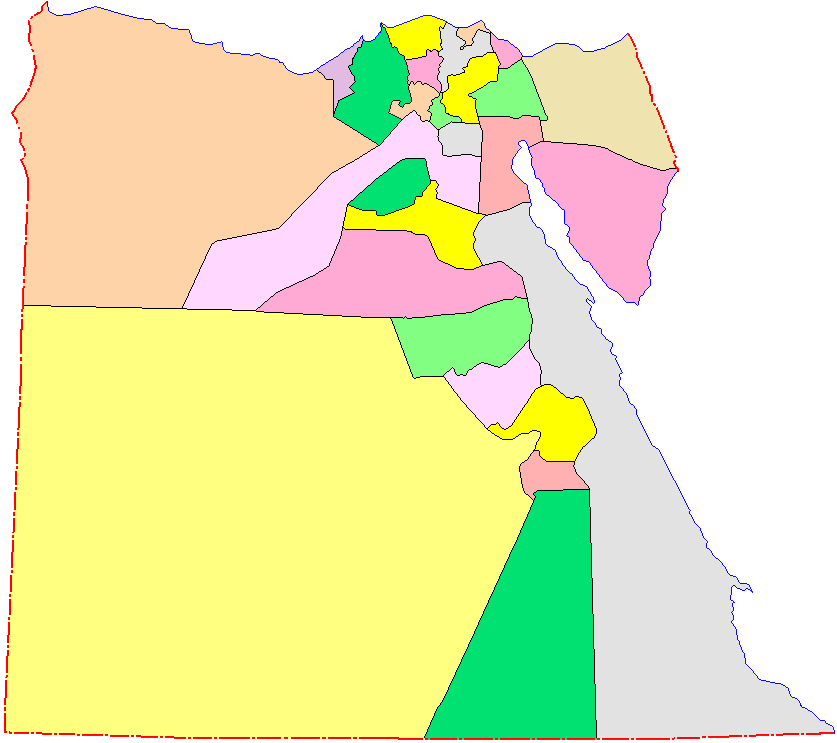

=== Sub-districts and special administrative units ===
There are additional subdivisions into smaller units and non-administrative census blocks.

In city governorates, districts are further subdivided into non-administrative units called sheyakha (lit. sheikhdom, شياخة). In urban–rural governorates, cities may be divided into districts, although this is not always the case, and these cities may also be subdivided into sheyakhas. Additionally, some cities in those governorates are divided directly into sheyakhas without an intermediate layer.

Two special categories exist outside the traditional administrative structure, but are intended for eventual transfer to local administration:

- New urban communities, governed by the New Urban Communities Authority (NUCA) under the Minister of Housing.
- Agricultural villages, built by the Ministry of Agriculture in its desert land reclamation schemes.

=== Economic regions ===
Separate from administrative divisions, Egypt has seven economic regions for planning purposes, as defined by the General Organization for Physical Planning (GOPP).

== History ==
=== Ancient history ===
Upon unification of Egypt around 3100 BCE, ancient Egypt was fundamentally divided into two geographical macro-regions: Upper Egypt (the southern Nile Valley) and Lower Egypt (the northern Nile Delta). These were further subdivided into 42 administrative districts called nomes (22 in the South, 20 in the North), governed by appointed nomarchs.

=== Medieval history ===
After the 9th century, medieval Egypt transitioned from a unified provincial territory into a highly militarized independent state divided into macro-regions and micro-provinces. The central government controlled the country through cadastral land surveys (known as Rawk), which allocated lands as military fiefs (Iqta) to the ruling local elite.

=== Modern history ===
==== Centralization after the 1952 revolution ====
Before the 1952 Egyptian revolution, state penetration of the rural areas was limited by the power of local notables. Under Nasser, land reform reduced those notables' socioeconomic dominance, and the peasants were incorporated into cooperatives, which transferred mass dependence from landlords to the government. The extension of officials into the countryside permitted the regime to bring development and services to the village. The local branches of the ruling party, the Arab Socialist Union (ASU), fostered a certain peasant political activism and coopted the local notables — in particular, the village headmen — and checked their independence from the regime.

Until 1979, local government enjoyed limited power in Egypt's highly centralised state. Under the central government, there were twenty-six governorates (27 today), which were subdivided into counties (In Arabic: مركز markaz "center", plural: مراكز marākiz), each of which was further subdivided into towns or villages. At each level, there was a governing structure that combined representative councils and government-appointed executive organs headed by governors, district officers, and mayors, respectively. Governors were appointed by the president, and they, in turn, appointed subordinate executive officers. The coercive backbone of the state apparatus ran downward from the Ministry of Interior through the governors' executive organs to the district police station and the village headman.

==== Decentralisation under Sadat ====
State penetration did not retreat under Anwar Sadat, though the earlier effort to mobilize peasants and deliver services disappeared as the local party and cooperative withered. However, administrative controls over the peasants remained intact. The local power of the old families and the headmen revived but more at the expense of peasants than at the expense of the state. The district police station balanced the notables, and the system of local government (the mayor and council) integrated them into the regime.

Sadat took several measures to administratively decentralise power to the provinces and towns, with limited fiscal and almost no political decentralisation. Governors acquired more authority under Law 43/1979, which reduced the administrative and budgetary controls of the central government over the provinces. The elected councils acquired, at least formally, the right to approve or disapprove the local budget. In an effort to reduce local demands on the central treasury, local government was given wider powers to raise local taxes. Local representative councils became vehicles of pressure for government spending, and the soaring deficits of local government bodies had to be covered by the central government. Local government was encouraged to enter into joint ventures with private investors, and these ventures stimulated an alliance between government officials and the local rich that paralleled the infitah alliance at the national level.

==== Under Mubarak ====
Under president Hosni Mubarak's rule (1981–2011), decentralisation continued to evolve. Some scholars believed local autonomy was achieved, as local policies often reflected special local conditions. Thus, officials in Upper Egypt often bowed to the powerful Islamic movement there, while those in the port cities struck alliances with importers.

However, others found that local governance proved impotent. Parliamentarians were reduced to the roles of local councillors, lobbying at the parliamentary level for basic local services, while the elected Local Popular Councils (LPC) had a parallel ceremonial role to the appointed Local Executive Councils (LEC), which managed the local departments.

In April 2008, two new governorates were created through presidential decree: Helwan Governorate (separated from Cairo Governorate) and the 6th of October Governorate (separated from Giza Governorate). Luxor was also officially upgraded from a city with special status to a full governorate in December 2009.

Elections of the LPCs have also been observed to be fraudulent. The ruling National Democratic Party (NDP) won 95 percent of local council seats during the last election in 2008, with 84 percent of the seats won unopposed.

==== Post-2011 revolution ====
After Mubarak was deposed by the popular uprising of the January 2011, parliament and local councils were dissolved pending the writing of a new constitution. The interim government dissolved both the Helwan and 6th of October governorates, reincorporating them back into Cairo Governorate and Giza Governorate respectively. The short-lived 2012 constitution and the current 2014 version gave wider local power through more decentralisation.

However, by the end of 2022, these provisions had yet to be implemented, as the government prolonged the process of drafting a new local administration law, leaving LPC seats vacant for over a decade.

== List of governorates ==
Egypt is divided into 27 governorates (muhāfazāt), each with a capital and at least one other city. Each governorate is administered by a governor (muhāfiz) who is appointed by the President of Egypt and serves at the president's discretion. Most governorates have a population density of more than one thousand per km^{2}, while the three largest have a population density of less than two per km^{2}. Administratively, the vast majority of the area of the Sinai Peninsula is divided into two governorates: the South Sinai Governorate and North Sinai Governorate. Three other governorates span the Suez Canal, crossing into African Egypt: Suez Governorate on the southern end of the Suez Canal, Ismailia Governorate in the center, and Port Said Governorate in the north.

Governorates
Name	Area		Population (Nov. 2023 estimate)	Density (Nov. 2023)		Capital	Economic Region
Name	km^{2}	sq mi	Population (Nov. 2023 estimate)	per km^{2}	per sq mi	Capital	Economic Region
Alexandria	2,300	890	5,703,824	2,480	6,400	Alexandria	Alexandria
Aswan	62,726	24,219	1,698,201	27	70	Aswan	South Upper Egypt
Asyut	25,926	10,010	5,071,485	196	510	Asyut	Asyut
Beheira	9,826	3,794	6,940,234	706	1,830	Damanhur	Alexandria
Beni Suef	10,954	4,229	3,618,395	330	850	Beni Suef	North Upper Egypt
Cairo	3,085	1,191	10,456,284	3,389	8,780	Cairo	Greater Cairo
Dakahlia	3,538	1,366	7,058,212	1,995	5,170	Mansoura	Delta
Damietta	910	350	2,023,380	2,223	5,760	Damietta	Delta
Faiyum	6,068	2,343	4,141,222	682	1,770	Faiyum	North Upper Egypt
Gharbia	1,942	750	5,483,000	2,823	7,310	Tanta	Delta
Giza	13,184	5,090	9,534,283	723	1,870	Giza	Greater Cairo
Ismailia	5,067	1,956	1,482,999	293	760	Ismailia	Suez Canal
Kafr El Sheikh	3,467	1,339	3,731,540	1,076	2,790	Kafr El Sheikh	Delta
Luxor	460	180	1,429,385	3,107	8,050	Luxor	South Upper Egypt
Matrouh	166,563	64,310	580,304	3	7.8	Marsa Matruh	Alexandria
Minya	32,279	12,463	6,332,918	196	510	Minya	North Upper Egypt
Monufia	2,499	965	4,743,341	1,898	4,920	Shibin El Kom	Delta
New Valley	440,098	169,923	324,600	0.7	1.8	Kharga Oasis	Asyut
North Sinai	28,992	11,194	544,494	19	49	Arish	Suez Canal
Port Said	1,345	519	835,193	621	1,610	Port Said	Suez Canal
Qalyubiyya	1,124	434	6,137,896	5,461	14,140	Banha	Greater Cairo
Qena	10,798	4,169	3,651,215	338	880	Qena	South Upper Egypt
Red Sea	119,099	45,984	409,394	3	7.8	Hurghada	South Upper Egypt
Sharqia	4,911	1,896	8,032,683	1,636	4,240	Zagazig	Suez Canal
Sohag	11,022	4,256	5,714,903	518	1,340	Sohag	South Upper Egypt
South Sinai	31,272	12,074	145,934	5	13	El Tor	Suez Canal
Suez	9,002	3,476	843,385	94	240	Suez	Suez Canal
Total	1,010,407	390,120	106,668,704	106	270	Cairo	

== List of municipal divisions ==
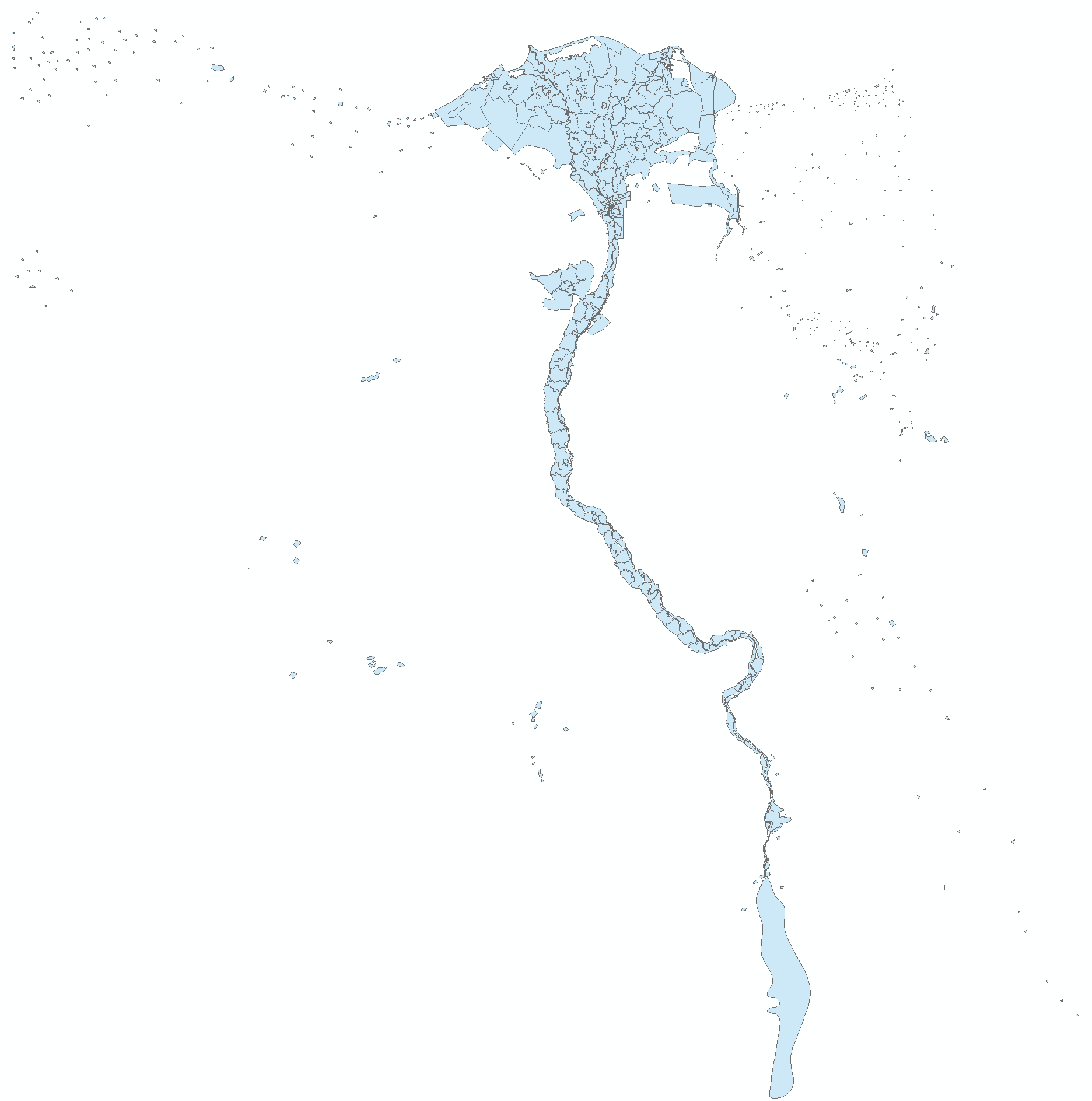
Map of Egypt's municipal divisions.

As of 2013, there were 351 subdivisions, of which 177 were qisms, 162 marakiz, 9 new cities, and 3 police-administered areas. There are also unorganized areas in the Alexandria, Aswan, Asyut, Beheira, Beni Suef, Cairo, Dakahlia, Damietta, Faiyum, Giza, Ismailia, Kafr El Sheikh, Luxor, Minya, Port Said, Qalyubia, Qena, Sharqia, Sohag, and Suez governorates.

Municipal divisions
Qism	Markaz	New city	Police-administered
6th of October 1	Abnub	New Akhmim	Alexandria Port Police Dept.
6th of October 2	Abu El Matamir	New Aswan	Port Said Police Dept.
10th of Ramadan 1	Abu Hammad	New Asyut	Suez Port Police Dept.
10th of Ramadan 2	Abu Hummus	New Borg El Arab	
15th of May	Abu Kebir	New Faiyum	
Abdeen	Abu Qirqas	New Minya	
Abu Radis	Abu Simbel	New Qena	
Abu Zenima	Abu Tig	New Sohag	
Agouza	Abu Tisht	New Toshka	
Ain Shams	Aga		
Amreya	Akhmim		
Arish 1	Armant		
Arish 2	Ashmoun		
Arish 3	Aswan		
Arish 4	Asyut		
Aswan	Atfih		
Asyut 1	Awlad Saqr		
Asyut 2	Awsim		
Ataka	Badr		
Azbakeya	Banha		
Bab El Sharia	Baris Shurta		
Bab Sharq	Basyoun		
Badr	Beni Ebeid		
Banha	Beni Mazar		
Beni Suef	Beni Suef		
Bir El Abd	Biba		
Borg El Arab	Bilbeis		
Bulaq	Bilqas		
Bulaq El Dakrur	Birket El Sab		
Dahab	Biyala		
Damanhur	Burullus		
Damietta 1	Dairut		
Damietta 2	Damanhur		
Dekhela	Damietta		
Desouk	Dar El Salam		
Dokki	Daraw		
El Ahram	Deir Mawas		
El Arab	Dekernes		
El Arbein	Desouk		
El Atareen	Dishna		
El Basal Port	Diyarb Negm		
El Basatin	Edfu		
El Dabaa	Edku		
El Darb El Ahmar	El Ayyat		
El Dawahy	El Badari		
El Gamaliya	El Badrashein		
El Ganayin	El Bagour		
El Gomrok	El Balyana		
El Hamam	El Delengat		
El Hassana	El Fashn		
El Hawamdiya	El Fath		
El Kawsar	El Gamaliya		
El Khalifa	El Ghanayem		
El Labban	El Hamool		
El Manakh	El Husseiniya		
El Manasra	El Ibrahimiya		
El Mansheya	El Idwa		
El Marg	El Mahalla El Kubra		
El Matareya	El Mahmoudia		
El Muski	El Mansha		
El Nozha	El Manzala		
El Omraniya	El Maragha		
El Qanayat	El Matareya		
El Qantara El Sharqiya	El Qanater El Khayreya		
El Qoseir	El Qantara		
El Qurein	El Qusiya		
El Raml 1	El Rahmaniya		
El Raml 2	El Reyad		
El Salam	El Saff		
El Sayeda Zeinab	El Santa		
El Segil	El Senbellawein		
El Sharabiya	El Shohada		
El Sharq	El Usayrat		
El Shorouk	El Waqf		
El Tebbin	El Wasta		
El Tor	El Zarqa		
El Wahat El Bahariya	Esna		
El Wahat El Khariga	Faiyum		
El Warraq	Faqous		
El Weili	Faraskur		
El Zaher	Farshut		
El Zawya El Hamra	Fayed		
El Zohur	Fuwa		
Faisal	Girga		
Faiyum	Giza		
Faqous	Hihya		
Gamasa	Hosh Essa		
Ganoubi 1	Ibsheway		
Ganoubi 2	Ihnasiya		
Gharb Nubariya	Imbaba		
Girga	Ismailia		
Giza	Itay El Barud		
Hada'iq El Qobbah	Itsa		
Hala'ib	Juhayna El Gharbiyah		
Heliopolis	Kafr El Dawwar		
Helwan	Kafr El Sheikh		
Hurghada	Kafr El Zayat		
Hurghada 2	Kafr Saad		
Imbaba	Kafr Saqr		
Ismailia 1	Kafr Saad		
Ismailia 2	Kerdasa		
Ismailia 3	Khanka		
Kafr El Dawwar	Kom Hamada		
Kafr El Sheikh	Kom Ombo		
Karmoz	Kotoor		
Khusus	Luxor		
Luxor	Maghaghah		
Maadi	Mahallat Dimna		
Mallawi	Mallawi		
Mansoura 1	Manfalut		
Mansoura 2	Mansoura		
Marina El Alamein	Mashtool El Souk		
Marsa Alam	Matay		
Menouf	Menouf		
Mersa Matruh	Metoubes		
Minya	Minya		
Mit Ghamr	Minya El Qamh		
Moharam Bek	Minyet El Nasr		
Monshat El Nasr	Mit Ghamr		
Montaza	Mit Salsil		
Mubarak Sharq El Tafrea	Nabaroh		
Nasr City 1	Nag Hammadi		
Nasr City 2	Naqada		
New Beni Suef	Nasir Bush		
New Cairo 1	Nasr		
New Cairo 2	Qena		
New Cairo 3	Qift		
New Damietta	Quesna		
New Salhia	Qus		
North Coast	Rosetta		
North Coast	Sadat City		
Nuweiba	Sahil Salim		
Obour	Samalut		
Old Cairo	Samanoud		
Port Fuad	Saqultah		
Port Fuad 2	Shibin El Kom		
Qaha	Shibin El Qanatir		
Qalyub	Shirbin		
Qasr El Nil	Shubrakhit		
Qena	Shurtet El Dakhla		
Rafah	Shurtet Farafra		
Ras El Bar	Sidfa		
Ras Gharib	Sidi Salem		
Ras Sidr	Sinnuris		
Rod El Farag	Sohag		
Safaga	Sumusta El Waqf		
Saint Catherine	Tahta		
Sallum	Tala		
Sers El Lyan	Talkha		
Shalateen	Tamiya		
Sharm El Sheikh	Tanta		
Sheikh Zayed	Tell El Kebir		
Sheikh Zuweid	Tima		
Shibin El Kom	Timay El Imdid		
Shubra	Tukh		
Shubra El Kheima 1	Wadi El Natrun		
Shubra El Kheima 2	Yousef El Seddik		
Shurtet El Qasima	Zagazig		
Shurtet Rumana	Zefta		
Siwa			
Sohag 1			
Sohag 2			
Suez			
Taba			
Tahta			
Tanta 1			
Tanta 2			
Tura			
Zagazig 1			
Zagazig 2			
Zamalek			
Zeitoun			

== Demographics ==
=== Urbanization ===
CAPMAS
Governorate	% Urban	Population (2016)	Rural	Urban
Alexandria	98.8	4,812,186	56,698	4,755,488
Aswan	42.3	1,431,488	826,543	604,945
Asyut	26.5	4,245,215	3,119,112	1,126,103
Beheira	19.5	5,804,262	4,674,346	1,129,916
Beni Suef	23.2	2,856,812	2,193,871	662,941
Cairo	100.0	9,278,441	0	9,278,441
Dakahlia	28.2	5,949,001	4,271,428	1,677,573
Damietta	38.7	1,330,843	815,244	515,599
Faiyum	22.5	3,170,150	2,456,368	713,782
Gharbia	30.0	4,751,865	3,324,630	1,427,235
Giza	58.6	7,585,115	3,138,310	4,446,805
Ismailia	45.4	1,178,641	643,778	534,863
Kafr El Sheikh	23.1	3,172,753	2,441,246	731,507
Luxor	37.8	1,147,058	713,422	433,636
Matrouh	70.6	447,846	131,841	316,005
Minya	18.9	5,156,702	4,183,284	973,418
Monufia	20.6	3,941,293	3,128,460	812,833
New Valley	48.0	225,416	117,180	108,236
North Sinai	60.2	434,781	173,095	261,686
Port Said	100.0	666,599	0	666,599
Qalyubiyya	44.7	5,105,972	2,825,045	2,280,927
Qena	19.7	3,045,504	2,445,051	600,453
Red Sea	95.1	345,775	17,062	328,713
Sharqia	23.1	6,485,412	4,987,707	1,497,705
Sohag	21.4	4,603,861	3,618,543	985,318
South Sinai	51.1	167,426	81,924	85,502
Suez	100.0	622,859	0	622,859
Total	42.7	87,963,276	50,384,188	37,579,088

=== Population density ===
Information for population is in thousands, pop density - persons/km^{2} and area is in km^{2}.

CAPMAS
Governorate	Population in thousands (2014-07-01)	Pop. Density (Inhabited Area)	Pop. Density (Total Area)	% Inhabited to Total	Inhabited Area	Total Area
Alexandria	4,761	2,841.5	2,070.0	72.8	1,675.50	2,300.00
Aswan	1,412	13,477.1	22.5	0.2	104.77	62,726.00
Asyut	4,181	2,656.3	161.3	6.1	1,574.00	25,926.00
Beheira	5,720	806.3	582.1	72.2	7,093.84	9,826.00
Beni Suef	2,812	2,053.4	256.7	12.5	1,369.41	10,954.00
Cairo	9,184	48,235.3	2,976.8	6.2	190.40	3,085.12
Dakahlia	5,881	1,662.1	1,662.1	100.0	3,538.23	3,538.23
Damietta	1,316	1,968.7	1,445.7	73.4	668.47	910.26
Faiyum	3,118	1,680.0	513.8	30.6	1,856.00	6,068.00
Gharbia	4,698	2,418.7	2,418.7	100.0	1,942.34	1,942.34
Giza	7,487	6,286.3	567.9	9.0	1,191.00	13,184.00
Ismailia	1,162	229.3	229.3	100.0	5,066.97	5,066.97
Kafr El Sheikh	3,132	903.5	903.5	100.0	3,466.69	3,466.69
Luxor	1,132	4,992.7	469.8	9.4	226.73	2,409.68
Matrouh	437	111.4	2.6	2.4	3,921.40	166,563.00
Minya	5,076	2,104.8	157.3	7.5	2,411.65	32,279.00
Monufia	3,890	1,596.9	1,556.6	97.5	2,435.93	2,499.00
New Valley	222	205.1	0.5	0.2	1,082.24	440,098.00
North Sinai	428	203.7	14.8	7.2	2,100.84	28,992.00
Port Said	660	499.7	490.7	98.2	1,320.68	1,344.96
Qalyubiyya	5,044	4,702.1	4,486.4	95.4	1,072.72	1,124.28
Qena	3,001	1,724.1	277.9	16.1	1,740.63	10,798.00
Red Sea	341	4,794.0	2.9	0.1	71.13	119,099.13
Sharqia	6,402	1,343.7	1,303.6	97.0	4,764.28	4,911.00
Sohag	4,536	2,845.8	411.5	14.5	1,593.92	11,022.00
South Sinai	166	9.9	5.3	53.7	16,791.00	31,272.00
Suez	615	68.3	68.3	100.0	9,002.21	9,002.21
Total	86,814	1109.1	85.9	7.8	78272.98	1010407.87

== See also ==
- List of cities and towns in Egypt
- Economic regions of Egypt
- List of governorates of Egypt by GDP
- List of governorates of Egypt by Human Development Index
- Lists of political and geographic subdivisions by total area
- ISO 3166-2:EG
