= Housing in Egypt =

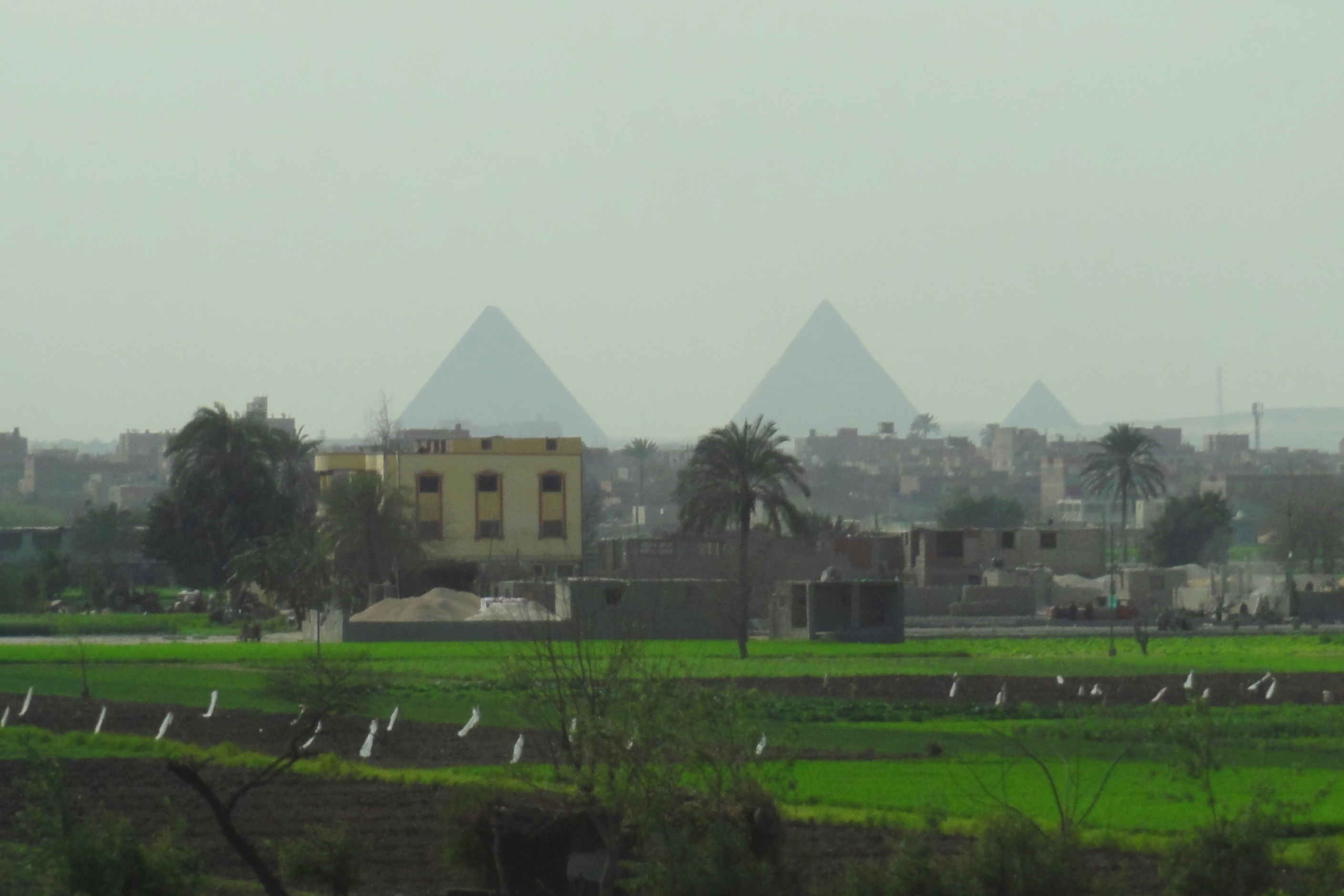
Modern self-built homes, and older rural houses near Ard El Liwa, Giza, with the Giza Pyramids in the background

Even though mathematically more housing than needed is produced in Egypt, resulting in millions of vacant homes, large portions of its residents live in inadequate housing that may lack secure tenure, safe drinking water and wastewater treatment, is crowded or prone to collapse, as better housing is widely unaffordable. There is also a problem with homelessness especially amongst children.

Egypt has also witnessed a number of urban disasters that have led to many deaths and mass homelessness, including the 1992 Dahshur Earthquake, the 1994 Floods in Upper Egypt, and the 2008 Duweiqa Rockslide in Cairo.

Efforts to address housing inequity date back by at least a century, ranging from designing model villages, rent control, and building public and cooperative housing. Since the 1980s, housing policy in Egypt has focused on what was termed the 'housing shortage', a quantitative estimate of needed homes, to be solved almost solely by building public housing estates in new towns in the vacant desert periphery of existing cities. This single dimensional approach to the problem has not been able to solve it, especially in the face of increasing deregulation of the housing market, spurring the commodification and financialization of housing.

== Housing Production ==
Egypt's residential construction involves three main sectors: first, the Informal Private Sector; individuals that usually self-build as well as contractors who build without a permit on either agricultural land or formal sub-divisions - some of which are referred to as slums or 'ashwaiyat (random or haphazard housing). Second is the Formal Private Sector, mostly small to large-scale contractors and real estate developers who apply for permits on government-sanctioned subdivisions and build for middle to upper-income clients. And third, the Public Sector; state-owned enterprises (SOEs) that build subsidised public housing, as well as a growing range for-profit housing for middle and upper-middle income clients.

According to the latest statistics, Egypt saw 738,000 units built in 2020/2021 by its three major producers. The informal private sector produced 402,000 units comprising 54% of all units produced last year, leading the two other sectors by a wide margin. It was followed by the formal private sector, building 170,000 units, or 23% of the total. In close third place was the public sector with 167,000 units, also garnering 23% of total production.

== Public Housing ==
It is a struggle for Egypt to keep up with housing needs due to its quickly increasing and existing population. For years, the state has taken it upon itself to provide housing for the poor, but this has become unsustainable as it doesn't have the budget for this type of continued provision.^{pg 85}

The Minister of Housing, Mostafa Madbouly, explained that "Egypt needs to build 500,000-600,000 new homes a year to keep up with demand, 70 percent of which should be aimed at the poor." The situation has been so dire that for years some Egyptians have resorted to living (and working) near and in the cemeteries. One such place is the City of the Dead in Cairo.

In July 2016, thousands of rental units were made available, as renting is easier than home ownership for many poor Egyptians. For example, thousand rental units were made available in Suez.

The Engineering Authority of the Armed Forces is normally the authority tasked with building government-subsidized housing (the Social Housing Program), such as the 6000 units which were built in Alexandria in 2016. Whether these efforts will work to make a real difference remain to be seen, with critics saying the poor wouldn't qualify for the units.

=== Subsidised Mortgage Programs ===
The system for providing mortgages to low and middle-income citizens expanded in 2017.

=== Public-Private Partnerships ===
In March 2014, a multibillion-dollar housing project was being discussed with Arabtec, a Dubai-based contractor, but was never implemented.

=== Slum Clearance and Rehousing ===
Housing needs are also addressed through loans. In 2015, the minister of housing said that part of the money from a $500 million loan to be received from the African Development Bank would go to social housing. In 2016, it was reported that the Informal Sector Development Fund and Cairo Governorate would cover the costs of upgrading three slums in Cairo. A grant from the German Society for International Cooperation was also to contribute to the costs. Housing needs are also addressed through aid (grants) received from foreign governments. In a program that began on 28 August 2012 through 2018, the European Union earmarked 40 million Euros for the upgrading of the infrastructure of nine informal areas in and around Cairo, Giza and Qalyubia Governorates.

== New Urban Communities ==
President Anwar Sadat began addressing the overcrowding in cities like Cairo by mandating the establishment of new urban communities, as new towns or satellite cities. The first new city was 10th of Ramadan, built in 1977. The law (59/1979) initiated the building of new towns or cities through the Ministry of Housing affiliated developer the New Urban Communities Authority (NUCA), but over the years some of these new areas failed to reach their target populations with Egyptians for a variety of reasons, choosing rather to remain living in the old, overcrowded cities.

=== Land Sales ===
When NUCA has land available for sale, investors apply for it and provide a deposit. A lottery is held and those investors who did not get a plot are refunded their deposits by the Housing and Development Bank. This method of land distribution can lead to speculation; investors believe they can make quick profits with resells. The repossession of land when projects are not completed is "rarely enforced" leading to empty lots and half-finished projects, as has been seen in 6th of October.

In 2016, the ministry reported a profit of EGP 22.2 bn, made by selling land and residential units.

Housing in Egypt has become extremely commodified and financialized through foreign investments in real estate development. In March 2015, EGP 12.7 billion in contracts were in the works with Arab real estate developers constructing projects in New Cairo and 6th of October city.

=== Corrupt Land Deals ===
During President Hosni Mubarak's time in office, land was sometimes sold by the ministry much below market value, as in the case of the Madinaty project.

The bureaucracy involved in getting official building permits and passing inspections on building projects encourages average middle-class people to avoid the process. Paying petty bribes allows people to bypass regulations faster.

== Self-built/ Informal settlements ==
Some officials and experts view housing inequity as a geographic phenomenon, where according to the housing minister, as of 2015 between 40 - 50% of homes in urban areas were informal.

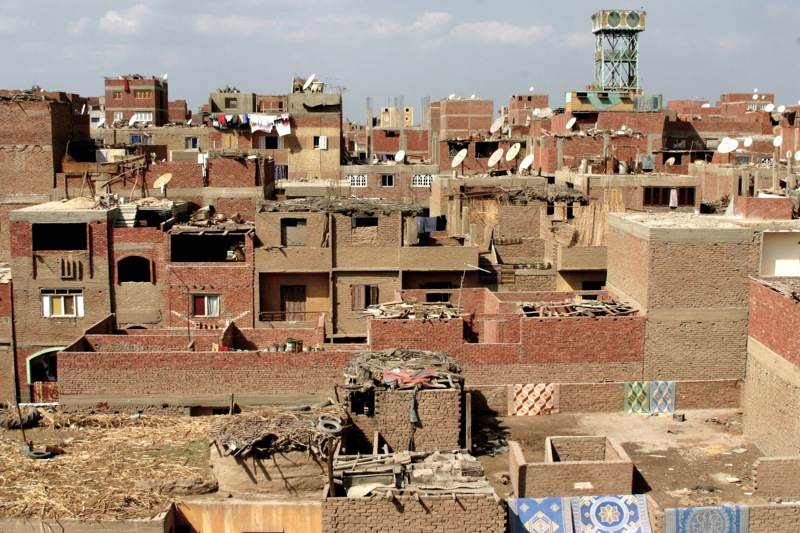
Typical self-built homes in Cairo, Egypt

Statistically, over two thirds of housing built between 2008 and 2018 was informal. Though not all informal or self-built housing is inadequate or deprived of basic services. In 2016 one third of Egyptian households (34.1%) were found to be deprived from one or more of six quantifiable components that have been used to define adequate housing; affordability, durable housing, secure tenure, sufficient living space (crowding), safe water and improved sanitation.

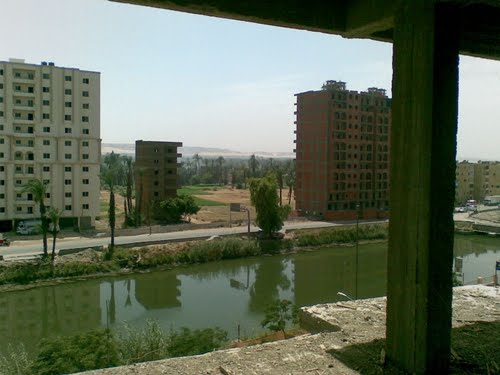
Developer 'towers' informally built on agricultural land in Qanabra, Sohag

Despite deprivation not being necessarily linked to geographic criteria, and despite many of the problems that could be addressed through the provision of services and policy change, most government projects have relied on slum clearance.

National Project to Upgrade the ashwaeyat (1993 - 2008)

Between 1993 and 2008, 'ashwaeyat were defined as "those [areas] difficult to control in terms of security because of their informal nature", according to a Parliamentary study outlining the first government project for the development of informal areas. This official interest after decades of self-built housing was a reaction to an urban disaster, the October 1992 Dahshur Earthquake that killed more than 560 people and left tens of thousands of families homeless; and a political disaster, the 'Republic' or 'Emirate' of Imbaba debacle where media exaggerated the social role played by Jama'a Islamiya after the earthquake in a working class district of Giza.

The government's main aim was imposing state control on the forgotten informal areas through infrastructure projects like water, sewage, and roads, in 1201 areas it identified as informal, in addition to the demolition of 20 areas it decided unfit for development.

After 14 years—and the "development" of only a third of these areas according to the CAPMAS report—the definition of informal areas was changed and the national project quietly killed off.

National Project to Upgrade Unsafe Areas (2009- )

The death of more than 115 people after a rock-slide in Al Duweiqa district in Cairo in September 2008 led the government to focus on what they called “unsafe areas”. These were seen as endangering residents due to four different criteria: their presence in unstable cliff areas or flood zones, the buildings' pronounced state of disrepair, the presence of sources of pollution, or the absence of secure tenure.

The Informal Settlements Development Facility (ISDF) was founded, producing a National Map for Unsafe Areas comprising 208,000 housing units in 404 unsafe areas and home to over 800,00 people.

Despite the drastic downsizing, only 14 percent (by unit number) of "unsafe areas" were "developed" by 2015, mainly due to inhabitants in most of the areas slated for development resisting the plans.

In early 2016, plans began for upgrading some of the slums in Cairo namely in Sayeda Zeinab, Mokattam, and Abdeen. In addition to government funding, the presidency affiliated Tahya Misr (Long Live Egypt) Fund charity contributed some funding. The fund's board of trustees included Basil El-Baz, Naguib Sawiris, Grand Mufti Ali Gomaa, Mohamed al-Amin, Major General Mohamed Amin Ibrahim Nasr, and headed by Alaa Youssef. The first phases of Tahya Masr rehoused people living in slums, with 12,000 new units built.

Civil Society and Participatory Upgrading

In parallel to the government's projects that mainly rely on slum clearance, a number of grassroots initiatives that have received little government support, in addition to some aid agency projects have tried to address spatial inequities in certain areas through participatory planning. Below are some examples:

Hayy al-Salam, Ismailia Sites and Services project (1977-1984 ) USAID and Culpin Planning.

Home Improvement Microloans, Upper Egypt (1995- ), Better Life Association for Comprehensive Development (BLACD).

Participatory Slum Upgrading at El Hallous and El Bahtini in Ismailia (2011). UNDP and GOPP.

Maspero Parallel Participatory Project, Cairo (2013-2015). Maspero Residents' Guild, Madd, Ministry of Urban Renewal.

The Participatory Urban Development Programme in Cairo (2004-2018), Ministry of Housing, Utilities & Urban Communities (MoHUUC) and the Deutsche Gesellschaft für Internationale Zusammenarbeit (GIZ) GmbH.

== Homelessness ==
Homelessness in Egypt is a significant social issue affecting some 12 million people in the country. Egypt has over 1,200 areas designated for irregular dwellings that do not conform to standard building laws, allowing homeless people to build shacks and other shelters for themselves.

Reportedly, in Egypt, homelessness is defined to include those living in marginal housing. Some scholars have stated that there is no agreed-upon definition of homelessness in Egypt due to the difficulties the government would face if an official definition were accepted.

According to UNICEF, there are 1 million children living on the streets in Egypt. Other researchers estimate the number to be some 3 million. Homelessness NGOs assisting street children include those such as the Hope Village Society, and NAFAS. Other NGOs, such as Plan International Egypt, work to reintegrate street children back into their families.
