= Abu Zaid Rajeh =

Egyptian architect and urban planner

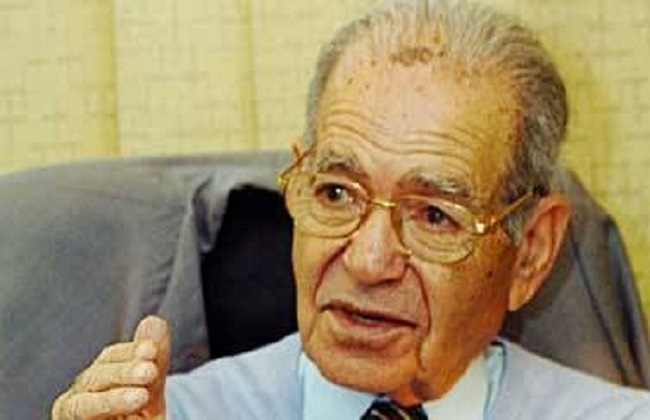
- Born: January 1, 1926; Zagazig
- Died: October 22, 2020 (aged 94); Cairo
- Occupations: architect, professor, engineer

Abu Zaid Hassan Rajeh (born January 1, 1926, in Zagazig - died October 22, 2020, in Cairo) was an Egyptian architect and urban planner. Rajeh held various official positions, including chairman of the board of directors of the Development and Popular Housing Company Limited (al-ta'mir wa-l-masakin al-sha'biya), the first government agency to build social housing in Egypt, and chairman of the board of the Housing and Building National Research Center (HBRC) affiliated with the Ministry of Housing.

He was also a member of the National Specialized Councils affiliated to the Presidency of the Republic, a member of the Supreme Council for Planning and Urban Development, and a member of the Architecture Committee of the Supreme Council of Culture. Apart from his official work, Rajeh founded his own architectural and engineering consulting office in 1958 with the architect Hassan Anwar and wrote numerous researches and books on housing and urban issues, the most famous of which is Egyptian Urbanism, which was published in two parts.

== Biography ==
Rajeh was born in Zagazig in the Sharkia governorate in 1926. From 1936 to 1939, he studied at the Emiri Primary School there and graduated from the high school in 1944. He then joined the Faculty of Engineering in the Cairo University, from which he graduated in 1949. He then obtained a master's degree from Harvard University in 1951, and a bachelor's degree from the University of Illinois in 1956.0

== Selected writing ==
"The Changing Pattern of Housing in Cairo". In The Expanding Metropolis: Coping with the Urban Growth of Cairo, edited by Ahmet Evin. Singapore: Concept Media/Aga Khan Award for Architecture, 1985.

"Al-Umran al-Masri" (Urbanism in Egypt), Academic Library, 2000. (Two parts).
