= Osama El-Baz =

Egyptian diplomat

Osama El-Baz أسامة الباز
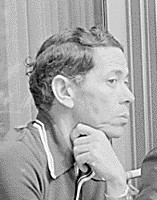
- Osama El-Baz at Camp David in 1978

Political Advisor for the President
- In office 1981–1998
- President: Hosni Mubarak

Ambassador
- In office 1977–1981
- Prime Minister: Anwar Sadat
- Succeeded by: Ismail Fahmi

Personal details
- Born: 6 July 1931 Tokh Al Aqlam, El Senbellawein, Dakahlia Governorate, Egypt
- Died: 14 September 2013 (aged 82) Cairo, Egypt
- Education: Cairo University; Harvard Law School

Osama El-Baz (Egyptian Arabic: أسامة الباز) (6 July 1931 – 14 September 2013) was an Egyptian diplomat and a senior advisor to former President Hosni Mubarak.

== Career ==
A graduate from Cairo University, he studied for six years in the United States, where he obtained his master's degree from Harvard Law School.

El-Baz later joined the Egyptian foreign service, and was made chef de cabinet with ambassadorial rank in 1977. When Ismail Fahmi resigned in 1977 to protest President Anwar El Sadat's visit to Jerusalem, El-Baz volunteered to help the president in planning his negotiations with Israel. He was sent to Israel where he negotiated the terms for the Egyptian President's visit. His colleague in those preparations was Boutros Boutros-Ghali, who later went on to become Secretary-General of the United Nations. El-Baz represented the Arab nationalist, while Boutros-Ghali was a cautious pro-Westerner.

Following Sadat's assassination in 1981, Egypt's new president Hosni Mubarak took El-Baz as an advisor, where he headed the Presidential Office for Political Affairs.

El-Baz was considered an éminence grise, and was more influential than most members of the Cabinet, especially in foreign-policy matters. He was sent on sensitive missions which would be inappropriate for the Foreign Minister to undertake.

According to Al-Ahram, he was sidelined during the last years of the Hosni Mubarak regime. El-Baz was even spotted during the 18-day Tahrir Square sit-in in January 2011, at the start of the Arab Spring.

Osama El-Baz is the late father of Egyptian industrialist, entrepreneur, and business executive Basil El-Baz, as well as a brother to famed NASA geologist Farouk El-Baz.

== Personal life ==
Osama El-Baz has eight siblings, who are: Mohammed El-Baz (the eldest), Isam El-Baz, Farouk El-Baz, Laila El-Baz, Soraya El-Baz, Safa El-Baz, Hazim El-Baz and Nabeel El-Baz (the youngest).
