= Port Said Governorate =

Governorate of Egypt

Coordinates: 31°16′N 32°18′E

Port Said Governorate محافظة بورسعيد Muḥāfaẓat Būr Saʼīd
- Governorate
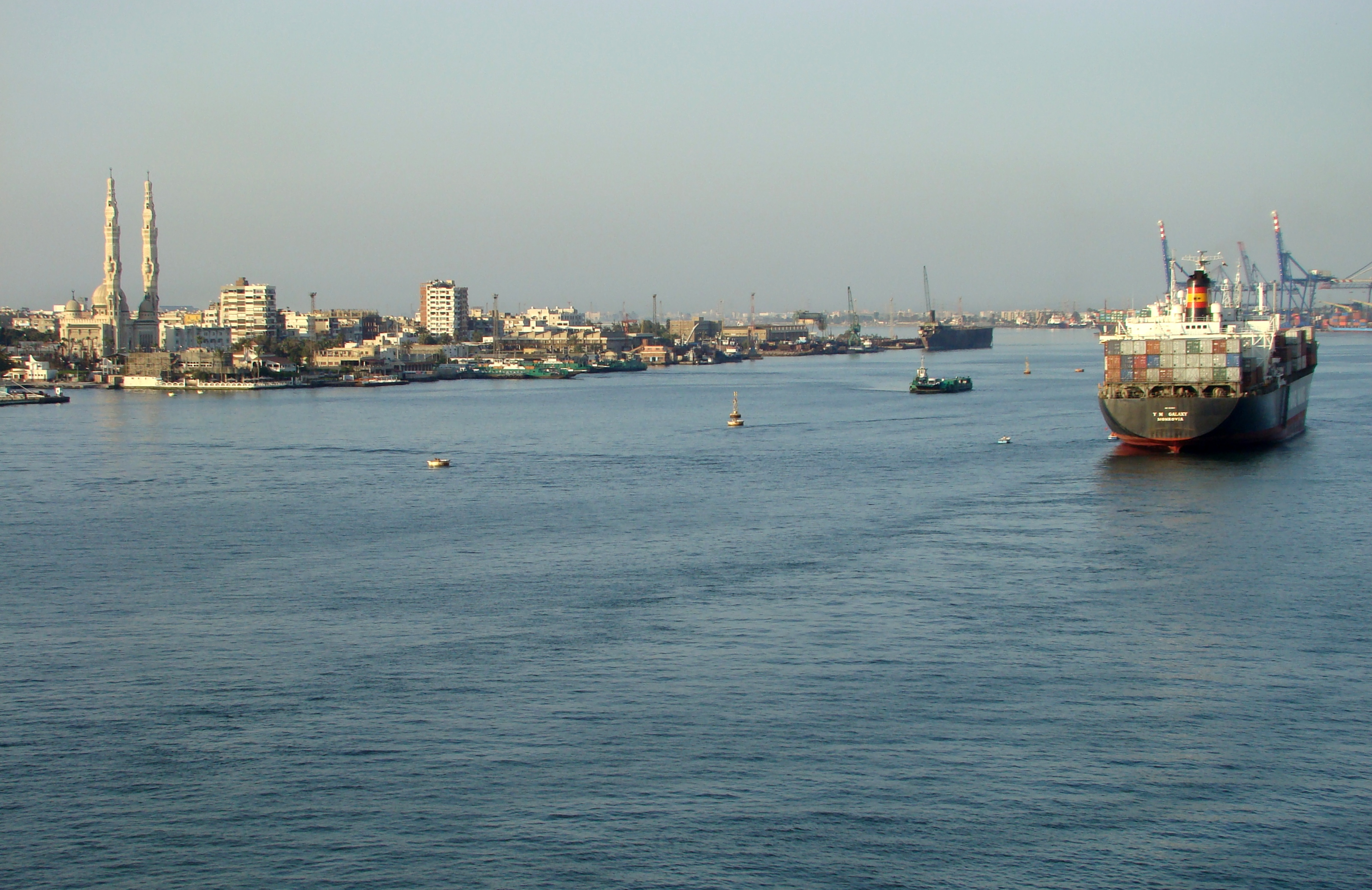

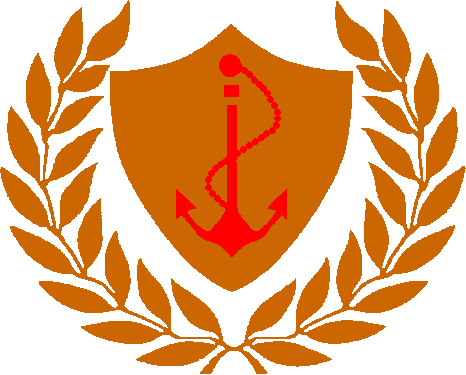
- Flag Emblem

- Port Said Governorate on the map of Egypt
- Country: Egypt
- Seat: Port Said (capital)

Government
  - Governor: Ibrahim Abou Limon

Area
  - Total: 1,345 km^{2} (519 sq mi)

Population (1 January 2023)
  - Total: 789,241
  - Density: 586.8/km^{2} (1,520/sq mi)

GDP
  - Total: EGP 190 billion (US$ 12.1 billion)
- Time zone: UTC+2 (EGY)
  - Summer (DST): UTC+3 (EEST)
- Calling code: (+20) 66
- National Day: December 23 (Victory Day over the Tripartite aggression)
- HDI (2021): 0.801 very high · 1st
- Website: www.portsaid.gov.eg

Port Said Governorate (Arabic: محافظة بورسعيد, romanized: Muḥāfaẓat Būr Saʼīd) is a governorate located at the northeast end of the Nile Delta, on the coast of the Mediterranean Sea at the northern mouth of the Suez Canal in north-eastern Egypt. It is wholly urban, comprising the original Port Said city on the west bank of the Suez Canal, and the town of Port Fuad on the eastern bank, which makes it one of the few transcontinental metropolitans in the world, as it spans across two continents (Africa/Asia).

Port Said is one of six governorates that make up the Suez Canal economic region, and is the home of the Suez Canal Authority historical administrative building and the Lighthouse of Port Said.

== Geography ==
In 2015 a huge natural gas reserve was discovered off the coast of Port Said and was described as "the largest ever found in the Mediterranean Sea". Egypt now has one of the largest areas of natural gas and Italian company, ENI has been contracted to work on the natural gas liquefaction for Egypt. It was welcome news as Egypt has long suffered an energy crisis.

The New Suez Canal project launched in 2015 included dredging of the East Port Said Canal.

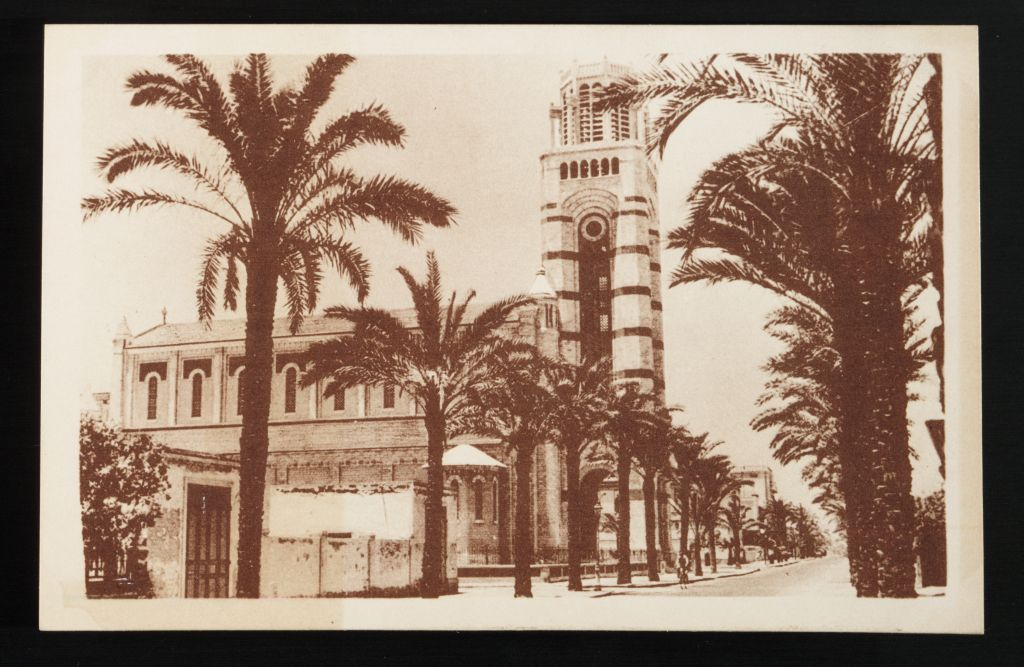
Port Said - the French Cathedral and Kitchner Street

== Municipal divisions and demographics ==
Port Said Governorate is divided into eight regions: The seven Port Said city districts (hayy) of Al-Sharq, Al-Arab, Al-Manakh, Al-Dawahi, Al-Janoub, Al-Zuhur, and West District, in addition to the district-town of Port Fuad.

These districts are further subdivided in to 11 qism (police ward) which had a total estimated population as of January 2023 of 789,241 people:

Municipal Divisions
Anglicized name	Native name	Arabic transliteration	Population (January 2023 Est.)	Type
Al Dawahi	قسم الضواحي	Aḍ-Ḍawāḥy	148,624	Kism (fully urban)
Al Arab	قسم العرب	Al-'Arab	60,251	Kism (fully urban)
Al Janoub	قسم الجنوب	Al-Janūb	41,901	Kism (fully urban)
Al Janoub 2	قسم ثان الجنوب	Al-Janūb 2	38,273	Kism (fully urban)
Al Manakh	قسم المناخ	Al-Manākh	84,679	Kism (fully urban)
Al Manasra	قسم المناصرة	Al-Manāṣrah	5,587	Kism (fully urban)
Al Sharq	قسم الشرق	Ash-Sharq	34,679	Kism (fully urban)
Al Zohur	قسم شرطة الزهور	Az-Zuhūr	266,381	Kism (fully urban)
Port Fuad	قسم أول بورفؤاد	Būr Fuād	89,541	Kism (fully urban)
Port Fuad 2	قسم ثان بورفؤاد	Būr Fuād 2	12,026	Kism (fully urban)
Police Department Port Said	إدارة شرطة ميناء بورسعيد	Idārah Shurṭah Mīnā' Būr Sa'īd		Police-administrated Area
Mubarak East	قسم شرق التفريعة	Mubārak - Sharq at-Tafrī'tah	7,299	Kism (fully urban)

== Social unrest ==
In February 2012, more than 70 people died in the Port Said Stadium Riot after a football match. Social unrest in early 2013 continued for at least two weeks. While protesting on 5 March 2013, protesters set fire to the governorate's headquarters and several people were injured.

In October 2016, some Egyptians protested rent increases.

== Industrial zones ==
According to the Governing Authority for Investment and Free Zones (GAFI), the following industrial zones are located in Port Said:

Zone name
C1 Industrial Zone
C6 Industrial Zone
C11 Industrial Zone (Craftsmen Housing and Workshops)
Industrial Zone Northwest of Portex Factory
Industrial Zone South of Port Said (Al Rasswa)
Industrial Zone Extension South of Port Said (Al Rasswa)

=== East Port Said Industrial Zone ===
Located on the Sinai side of the canal, Port Said East is a development project that contains the Suez Canal Container Terminal, which opened in 2004.

In November 2015, president Abdel Fattah el-Sisi publicly launched a new harbour development project at East Port Said.

A side canal at Port Said East was opened in 2016.

== Economy ==
To promote trade, during his presidency, Anwar Sadat declared it a duty-free zone. Port Said Governorate is a major transit point for trade, importing and exporting millions of tons of goods each year. Tourism is also promoted for the region.

== Important sites ==
There are several museums in this area. For cultural tourism one may want to visit the Port Said National Museum of Antiquities which opened in 1987 and is located at the confluence of the Suez Canal waters and the Mediterranean Sea. It houses about 9,000 artifacts from all eras, ranging from the Pharaonic, Greek, Roman, and modern eras, as well as Coptic and Islamic eras. The Military Museum of Port Said, established in 1964, commemorates the 1956 the tripartite aggression on the city. It features armory and military artifacts, equipment used in the wars fought between 1956 - 1967 and in 1973. El Nasr Museum of Modern Art in Port Said opened on 25 December 1995, and includes artwork by Egyptian artists in various branches of Fine Art.

The Statue de Lesseps, honoring Ferdinand de Lesseps, the developer of the Suez and Panama Canals, has its base at the entrance to the Suez Canal, along Palestine Street, where passing ships come from all over the world. This makes it a favorite with tourists. Nearby, is the Suez Canal Authority building built on the banks of Port Said at the start of the project.

The lighthouse and jetties at Port Said, located at the northern terminus of the Suez canal, and completed in 1869, were built of concrete of Teil lime and Port Said sand. The lighthouse is a monolith 180 feet high. In the construction 120,000 tons of Teil hydraulic lime were used. It was an important engineering feat involving 25,000 blocks, each weighing twenty-five tons.

Tall al Faramah, also called Pelusium, is of Ecclesiastical and archeological importance. It is an archeological, prehistoric site with ruins and a Byzantine church.

In 2004, the marine sector of Egypt had 3,013 fishermen who were categorized in the recreational fishing sector, fishing in and around the Mediterranean Sea and Red Sea. "Recreational fishing is widely practised along the Mediterranean Coast", where Port Said is located. Tel Tennis is an island (also called Tinnis or Thenessus) located 7 km (4.3 mi) southwest of Port Said on Lake Manzala and can be reached from Port Said by boat.

One can find historic churches in Port Said Governorate. There is a Roman Church, established in 1926, a Melkite Greek Catholic Church called Saint Elias Greek Catholic Church, and an old French Cathedral.

== See also ==
- Governorates of Egypt
