= Randa El-Menshawy =

Egyptian architect, engineer and politician (born 1963)

- راندة المنشاوي

Minister of Housing, Utilities & Urban Communities
- Incumbent
- Assumed office 11 February 2026
- President: Abdel Fattah el-Sisi
- Prime Minister: Mostafa Madbouly
- Preceded by: Sherif El-Sherbiny

Personal details
- Born: 3 October 1963 (age 63)
- Education: Helwan University

Randa Ali Saleh El-Menshawy (Egyptian Arabic: راندة المنشاوي; born 3 October 1963) is an Egyptian architect, engineer and politician. She has been serving as Minister of Housing, Utilities & Urban Communities of Egypt since 2026 and previously served as Deputy Minister of Housing and aide to the Prime Minister.

== Early life ==
Randa El-Menshawy was born on 3 October 1963. In 1985, she obtained a degree in architectural engineer from the Helwan University and, shortly after graduating, joined the Ministry of Housing as an architect.

The following year, in 1986, she moved to Kuwait, where El-Menshawy lived for twelve years, working for consultancy firms and designing various residential and office buildings.

== Career ==
In 1998, she returned to Egypt, where she rejoined the Ministry of Housing and became head of the minister's office, serving under at least five ministers, including Mostafa Madbouly and she became one of his closest allies. She also headed its Project Management Unit. In 2009, she was appointed Director-General of the Ministry's Centre for Housing and Construction Research, subsequently rising to the position of deputy director. She also set up the Project Management Unit, comprising young professionals and technical experts, and represented the ministry on the board of directors of the company responsible for the The New Capital.

On 14 September 2018, she was appointed by decree of President Abdel Fattah el-Sisi as Deputy Minister of Housing, becoming the first woman to hold the post. Among the projects she oversaw were the completion of 400 drinking water and sanitation projects, the repair of sanitation issues at over 300 water treatment plants, new social housing projects, the supervision of the development of the Beit El Watan financial district, and the repair of national roads.

President el-Sissi appointed her on 23 December 2019 senior advisor for monitoring affairs to Prime Minister Madbouly, once again becoming the first woman to hold the post. El-Menshawy was regarded as a highly influential figure within the Egyptian government. She also sits on the board of directors of the Housing and Development Bank, representing the New Urban Communities Authority.

On 10 February 2026, El-Menshawy was appointed Minister of Housing, Utilities & Urban Communities, succeeding Sharif El-Sherbini. She is the first woman to head the Ministry and was sworn in on 11 February by President el-Sissi after a cabinet reshuffle.
