= 1994 Durunka floods and lightning strike =

Weather phenomenon in Egypt

- Date: 2 November 1994
- Location: Durunka, Asyut Governorate, Egypt; 27.2°N 31.0°E
- Type: Fire and flood
- Cause: Lightning strike
- Deaths: 469
- Property damage: More than 200 houses destroyed
- Displaced: 20,000 people

On 2 November 1994, a lightning strike ignited three diesel and aircraft fuel tanks belonging to the Egyptian Army strategic reserve near the village of Durunka (alternate spelling: Dronka), Asyut Governorate in Egypt. The lightning was part of a severe storm that caused heavy flash flooding and widespread damage in four governorates in Upper Egypt leading to hundreds of deaths and tens of thousands of people made homeless in one of Egypt's worst urban disasters. The flooding compounded with the lightning strike meant flaming oil leaked from the tanks and was carried by floodwater into the village. More than 200 houses were destroyed and 469 people killed.

== Floods and strike ==
On 2 November 1994, a five-hour thunderstorm led to flash floods that affected 124 villages in the four governorates of Asyut, Sohag, Qena and Luxor.

Near the village of Durunka, Asyut, the flooding of a Western Desert ravine coincided with a lightning strike that hit at 78.6 m (258 ft) elevation at 27.2°N 31.0°E near Durunka, which was near a complex of eight oil tanks maintained by the Egyptian General Petroleum Corporation as a strategic reserve for the Egyptian Army. The tanks were spaced around 60 m (65 yd) apart and three of them caught fire. Around 15,000 t (15,000 long tons) of oil leaked from the tanks; there was no bund wall or any secondary confinement in place to contain the oil, which mixed with floodwaters that were being held back by a nearby railway line. The line collapsed, and the water and flaming oil washed into Dronka, a village of 10,000 people.

== Effects ==
Reports from the flooding in the four governorates show a total of almost 600 people were killed, and 11,148 houses destroyed and a further 11,085 damaged making 110,660 people homeless. In addition, 23,531 feddans (approx. 12,000ha) of agricultural land were devastated, and total damage exceeded $140 million.

The losses were concentrated in the village of Durunka, Asyut, where the Egyptian Ministry of Health and Population report noted that 469 bodies were recovered from there alone, and the World Meteorological Organization (WMO) considers this figure to be the death toll. More than 200 houses in Durunka were destroyed and 20,000 residents of the village and surrounding area fled to Assiut. One of the tanks remained ablaze into the night as firefighters decided it was best to let it burn out; there were fears it could ignite some of the surviving five oil tanks. The governor of Assiut declared a state of emergency due to the storm and lightning strike.

The WMO attributes the death toll of 469 to the lightning strike and notes the disaster is the highest mortality event as a result of a lightning strike on record (dating back to 1873). The highest death toll directly caused by a single lightning strike is 21 people killed while sheltering in a hut in Rhodesia (now Zimbabwe) in 1975.
