= List of governorates of Egypt by Human Development Index =

Overview of Egyptian governorates by HDI

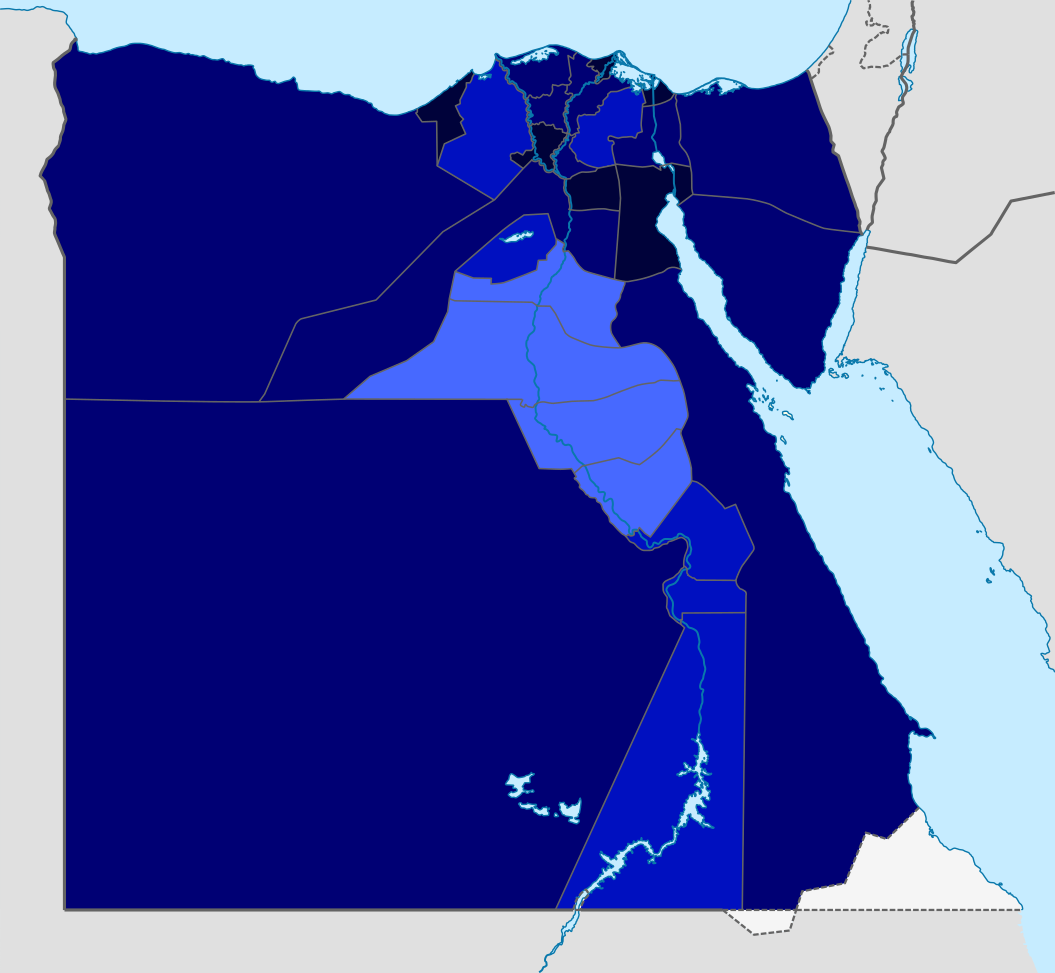
Map of governorates of Egypt by Human Development Index in 2021. Legend: 0.750-0.799 0.730-0.750 0.700-0.730 <0.700

This is a list of the governorates of Egypt by Human Development Index as of 2025 with data for the year 2023.

Rank	Governorate	HDI (2023)
Very high human development
1	Port Said	0.835
2	Suez	0.820
3	Alexandria	0.816
4	Cairo	0.816
High human development
5	Damietta	0.791
6	Monufia	0.785
7	Dakahlia	0.781
8	Ismailia	0.779
9	Gharbia	0.777
10	Frontier governorates ( Red Sea, New Valley, Matruh, North Sinai, South Sinai)	0.772
11	Qalyubia	0.768
12	Kafr El Sheikh	0.767
13	Giza	0.766
–	Egypt (average)	0.764
14	Sharqia	0.762
15	Aswan	0.758
16	Beheira	0.749
17	Qena (with Luxor)	0.739
18	Faiyum	0.732
19	Beni Suef	0.728
20	Minya	0.719
21	Sohag	0.715
22	Asyut	0.705

== See also ==
- List of countries by Human Development Index
