= Mostafa Madbouly =

Prime Minister of Egypt since 2018

- مصطفى مدبولي
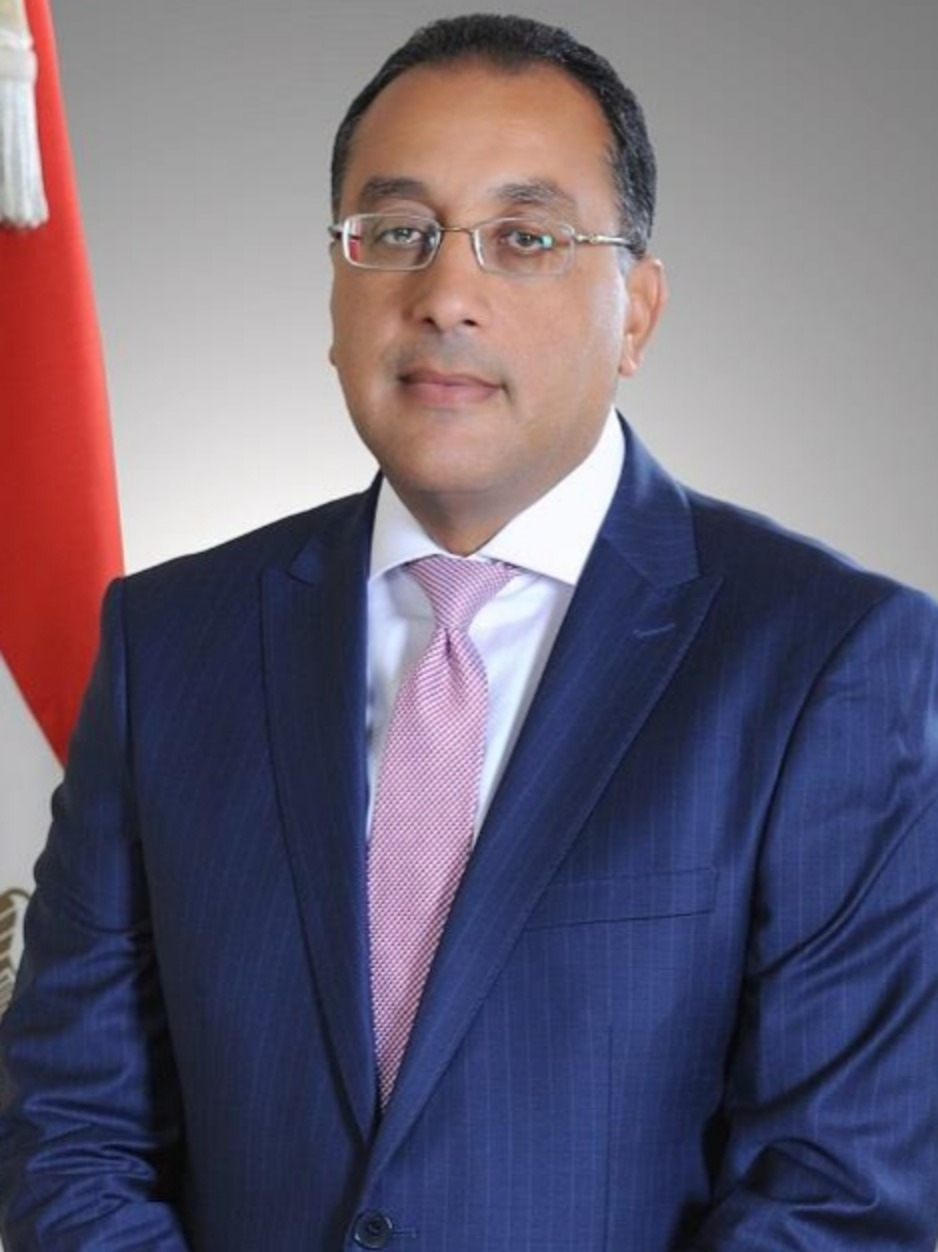
- Official portrait, 2018

54th Prime Minister of Egypt
- Incumbent
- Assumed office 14 June 2018; Acting: 7 June 2018 – 14 June 2018
- President: Abdel Fattah el-Sisi
- Deputy: Hussein Eissa
- Preceded by: Sherif Ismail

Minister of Housing, Utilities & Urban Communities
- In office 1 March 2014 – 14 February 2019
- Prime Minister: Ibrahim Mahlab; Sherif Ismail; Himself
- Preceded by: Ibrahim Mahlab
- Succeeded by: Assem el Gazzar

Personal details
- Born: 28 April 1966 (age 60) Qena, Egypt
- Party: Independent
- Education: Cairo University

Mostafa Kamal Madbouly (Note: Arabic: مصطفى كمال مدبولي, romanized: Muṣṭafā Kamāl Madbūlī, [mosˤˈtˤɑfɑ kæˈmæːl mædˈbuːli]) (born 28 April 1966) is an Egyptian politician who has served since 2018 as the 54th Prime Minister of Egypt. He was appointed by President Abdel Fattah el-Sisi to succeed Sherif Ismail following his government's resignation in the wake of el-Sisi's re-election. Madbouly also served in Sherif Ismail's cabinet as minister of housing, and had also briefly served as acting prime minister.

== Career ==
Madbouly graduated from Cairo University, receiving a master's degree and PhD from the Faculty of Engineering in 1988 and 1997, respectively.

=== Housing and Building Research Center ===
Madbouly started his career at the government's Housing and Building National Research Center (HBRC), becoming the director of the Training and Urban Studies Institute there.

=== General Organisation for Physical Planning ===
From September 2009 to November 2011, Madbouly was the chairman of the urban planning authority, the General Organisation for Physical Planning (GOPP) affiliated to the ministry of housing.

=== United Nations Human Settlements Program ===
From November 2012 until February 2014 he was the regional director for Arab countries at the United Nations Human Settlements Program.

=== Minister of Housing ===
In March 2014 Madbouly was appointed Minister of Housing, Utilities and Urban Communities succeeding Ibrahim Mahlab, who became prime minister. Madbouly remained in the post following the appointment of Sherif Ismail as prime minister in September 2015. During his tenure as housing minister, he oversaw the Social Housing Project (also known as the Million Housing Units project).

As housing minister, Madbouly was also chairman of a number of affiliated organisations including the New Urban Communities Authority (NUCA), Egypt's largest real estate developer and administrator of its New Cities program. There he oversaw key projects such as the New Administrative Capital.

=== Acting prime minister ===
In November 2017, Madbouly was appointed acting prime minister following Sherif Ismail's departure to Germany for medical treatment.

== Prime minister ==
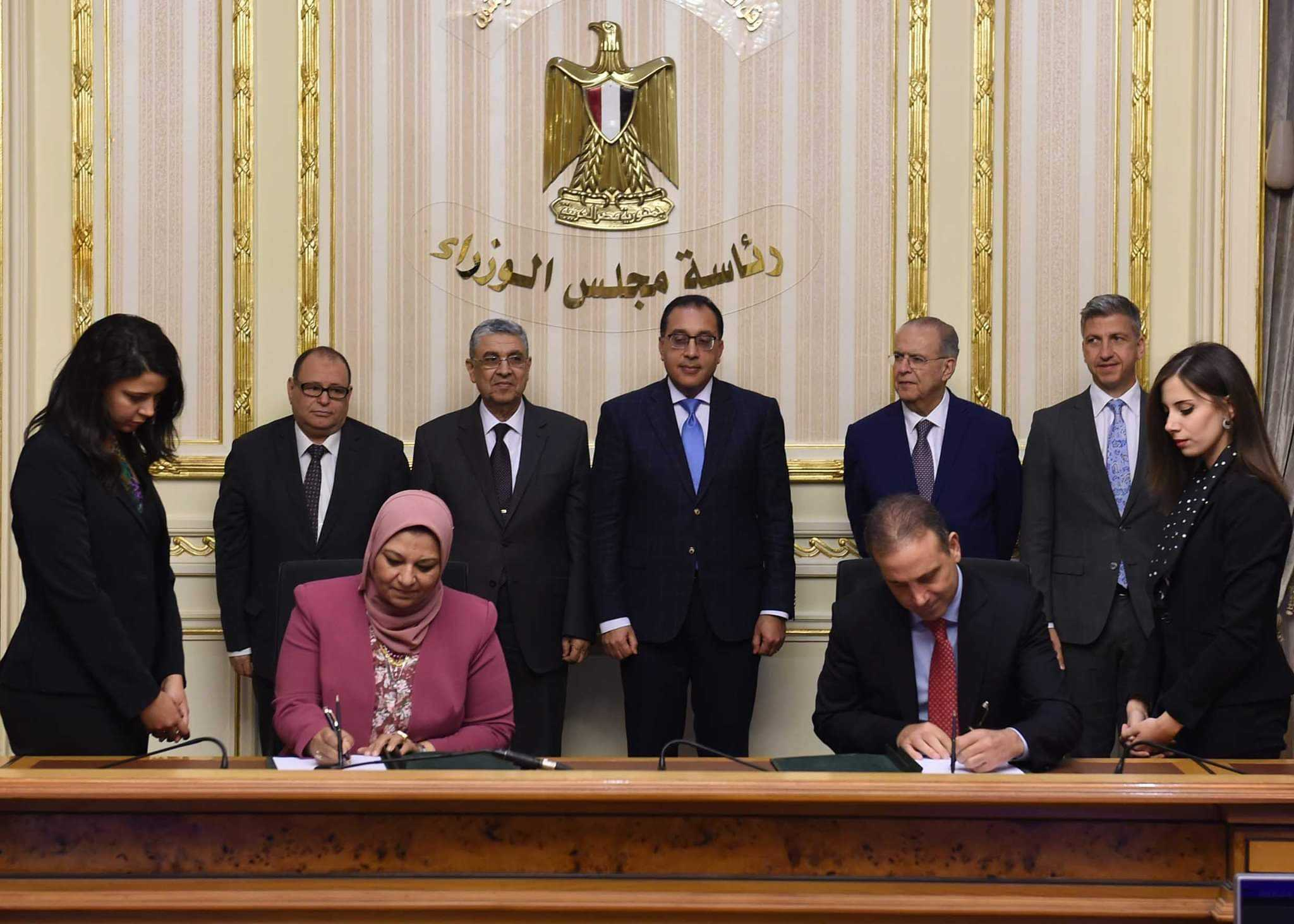
EuroAfrica Interconnector CEO Nasos Ktorides signed historic InterConnector agreement between Egypt and Cyprus in presence of Moustafa Madbouly, the Prime Minister of Egypt, Minister of Electricity, and Ioannis Kasoulides, Chairman of the EuroAfrica Strategic Council

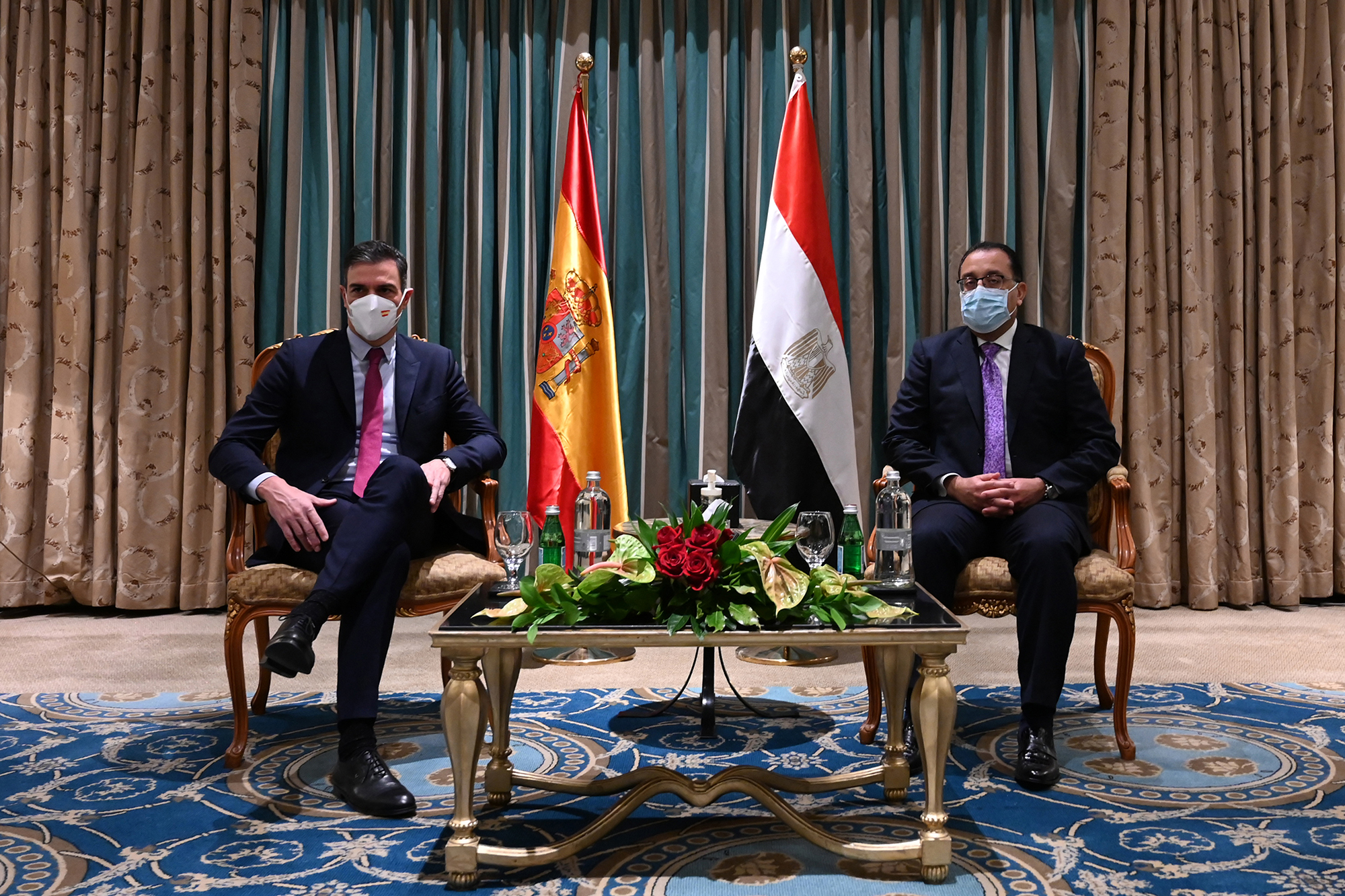
Madbouly with Spanish Prime Minister Pedro Sánchez in Cairo, 1 December 2021

On 7 June 2018, President Sisi appointed Madbouly as prime minister, succeeding Sherif Ismail who had resigned in the wake of Sisi's re-election in the controversial presidential election. On 9 June, Prime Minister Madbouly reshuffled Egypt's cabinet, replacing eight ministers. It was also reported the same day that the Egyptian Parliament had agreed to his new list of Cabinet Ministers. On 10 June, it was revealed that eight women would serve in his Cabinet, breaking the previous administration's record number of six. On 13 June, it was reported that Madbouly had selected 13 to 16 deputy ministers and that Madbouly and his government would be sworn in by Sisi on 14 June. Madbouly and his cabinet were sworn in by Sisi on 14 June. He will also maintain his position as Housing Minister. It was reported that government would issue its policy statement on 23 June, but parliamentary spokesman Salah Hassaballah stated these reports to be incorrect. On 23 June, Hassaballah stated that while no date was now scheduled to present the policy statement before Parliament, he expected the Madbouly government to present it in the next week but that the government was unable to prepare it in time for the planned date. On 30 June it was announced that Madbouly would present its policy statement on 3 July, in order to comply with the Constitutional 20-day deadline upon Cabinet formation.

On 3 July 2018, Madbouly officially issued his policy statement to the Egyptian parliament. In the statement, he declared that 85% of his economic reform programme had been accomplished. The statement was then sent to a parliament committee chaired by a House deputy speaker, which will afterwards be followed by a vote of confidence. Article 146 of the constitution stipulates that a newly appointed prime minister must deliver a policy statement before parliament, after which MPs should vote on the policy, in a process that ends within 30 days. On 11 July 2018, First deputy speaker of Egypt's parliament Al-Sayed Al-Sherif, who headed the parliamentary committee tasked with reviewing the Madbouly's policy statement, announced that his committee had completed its review of the statement and recommended a vote of confidence in favor for 15 July. On 25 July 2018, ten days after the intended date, the Egyptian parliament approved both Madbouly's cabinet and his policy statement in a vote of confidence.

== Notes ==
Political offices
Preceded by Sherif Ismail	Prime Minister of Egypt; 2018–present	Incumbent
