= Economic regions of Egypt =

Non-administrative regions for planning purposes

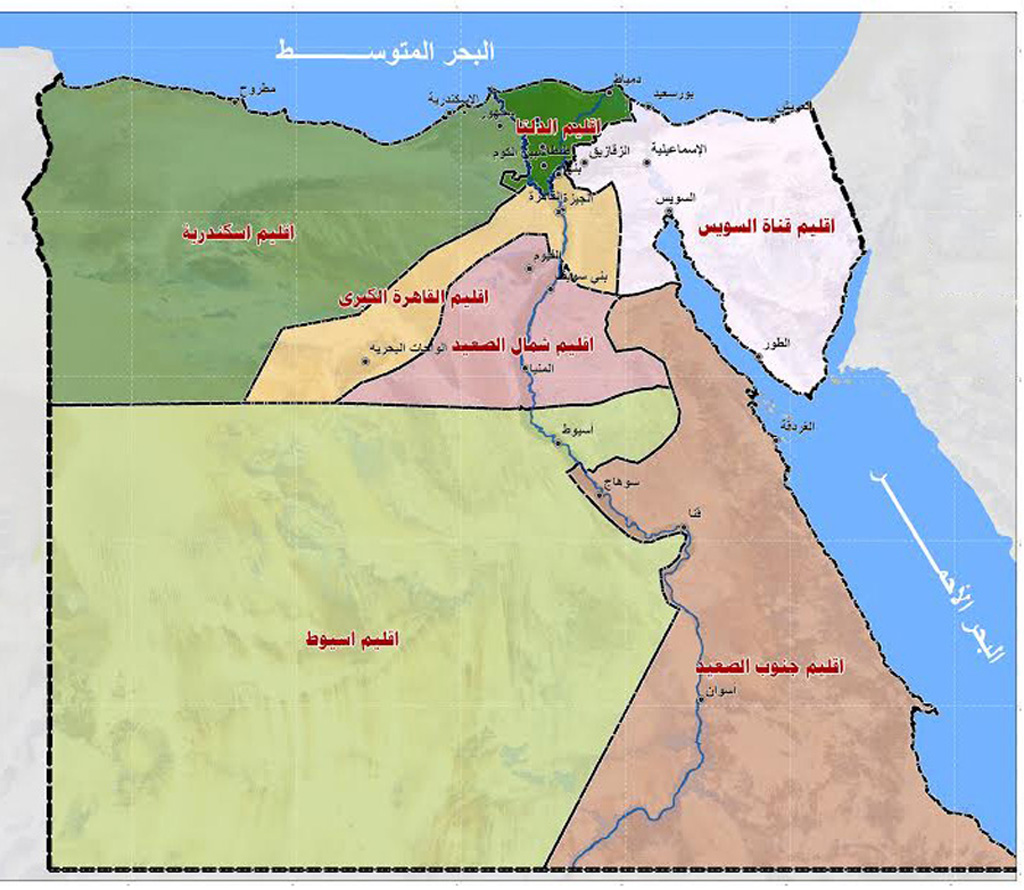
Economic regions of Egypt

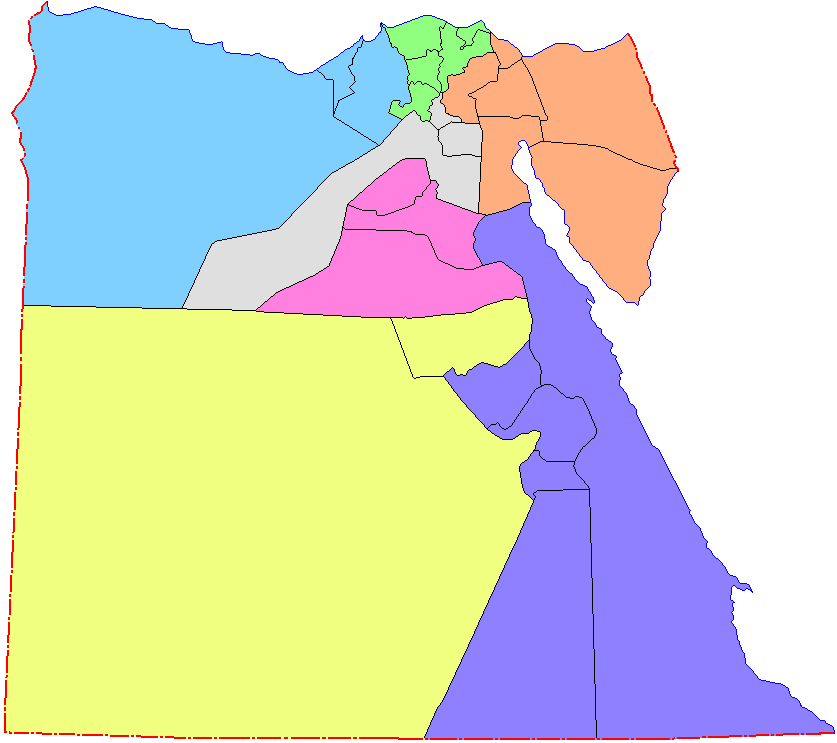
Economic regions overlapping with the old governorate borders

Egypt is divided into seven economic regions for economic and physical planning purposes. They were formally established by Presidential Decree 495/1977, which originally partitioned the country into seven economic regions, which were later reduced to seven after the Matrouh region merged with Alexandria. These regions do not have any new administrative representation in the local government hierarchy.

Instead, each region is composed of a number of contiguous governorates, with one designated as the capital of the region (that governorate's capital city).

Art. 2 established a Higher Committee for Regional Planning in each region, headed by the governor of the region's capital governorate. The committee comprises the governors, the heads of the Local Executive Councils, and the head of the national-level General Organization for Physical Planning (GOPP) as secretary-general.

Art. 3 set out a Planning Administration for each region, originally affiliated with the Ministry of Planning. In 2008, this was changed to a Regional Center for Urban Planning and Development affiliated to the GOPP. However, it was later believed that planning based on these units was unrealistic, thus decentralisation efforts were put in place.

Economic region	Area (km^{2})	Population (2015)	GDP (billion EGP)	GDP (billion US$)
Greater Cairo	17,342	21,969,529	2,986.037	190.211
Alexandria	224,076	11,064,294	970.284	61.807
Suez Canal	90,020	9,555,718	902.566	57.493
Delta	12,357	19,145,755	886.439	56.467
South Upper Egypt	216,212	10,573,686	386.923	24.647
North Upper Egypt	47,970	11,183,684	351.674	22.402
Central Upper Egypt	402,431	4,470,631	143.106	9.116
Egypt	1,010,408	94,798.827	6,627.028	422.142

== Economic regions ==
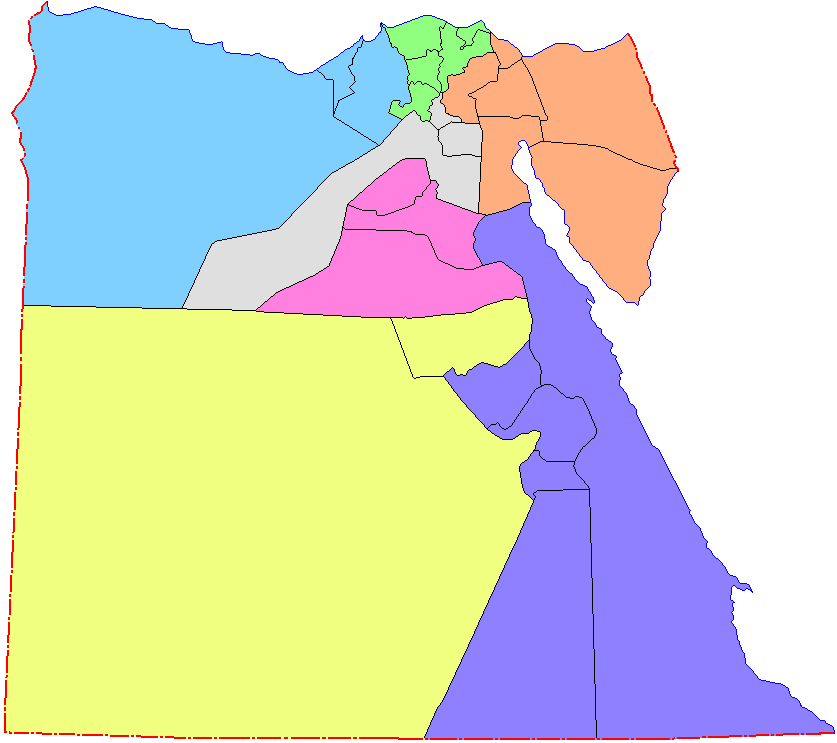
Map of Egypt's regional units for physical planning purposes. Greater Cairo Region Alexandria Region Delta Region Suez Canal Region North Upper Egypt Region Central Upper Egypt Region Southern Upper Egypt Region

There are seven regional units, containing the following governorates. In 2014, there were discussions to expand them to eleven regions, but those plans never happened.

The current structure is as follows:

Economic Region	Governorates	Capital
Greater Cairo	Cairo, Giza, Qalyubiyya	Cairo
Alexandria	Alexandria, Beheira, Matrouh	Alexandria
Delta	Dakahlia, Damietta, Gharbia, Kafr El Sheikh, Monufia	Tanta
Suez Canal	Ismailia, North Sinai, Port Said, Sharqia, Suez, South Sinai	Ismailia
North Upper Egypt	Beni Suef, Faiyum, Minya	Minya
Central Upper Egypt	Asyut, New Valley	Asyut
South Upper Egypt	Aswan, Luxor, Qena, Red Sea, Sohag	Aswan

== Gallery ==
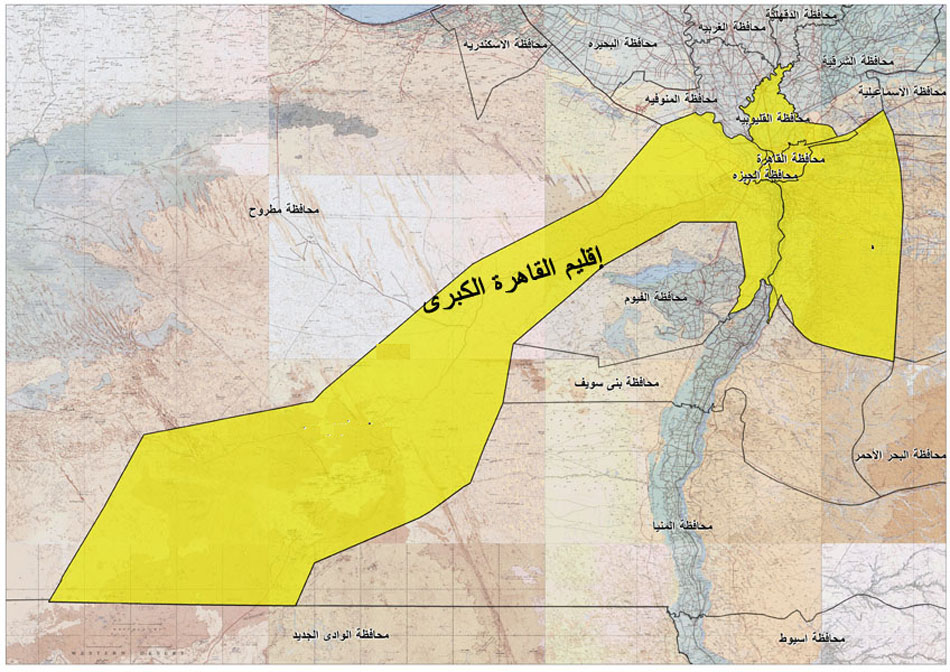
Greater Cairo Region

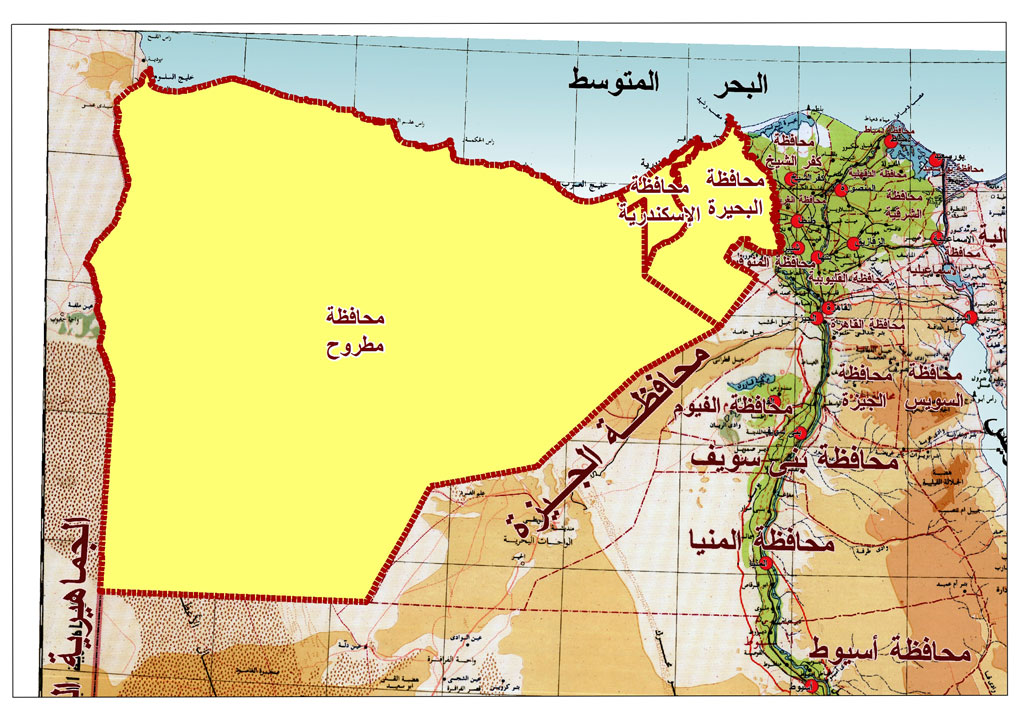
Alexandria Region

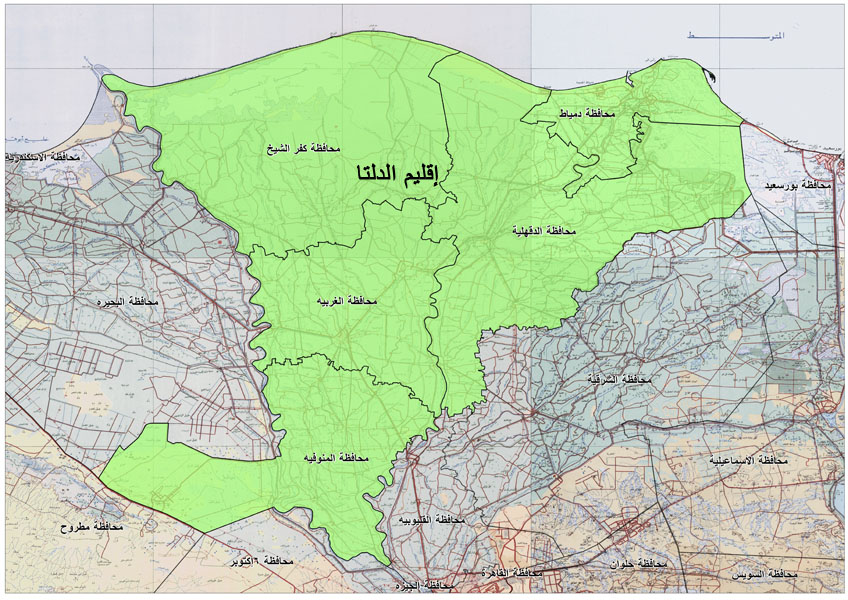
Delta Region

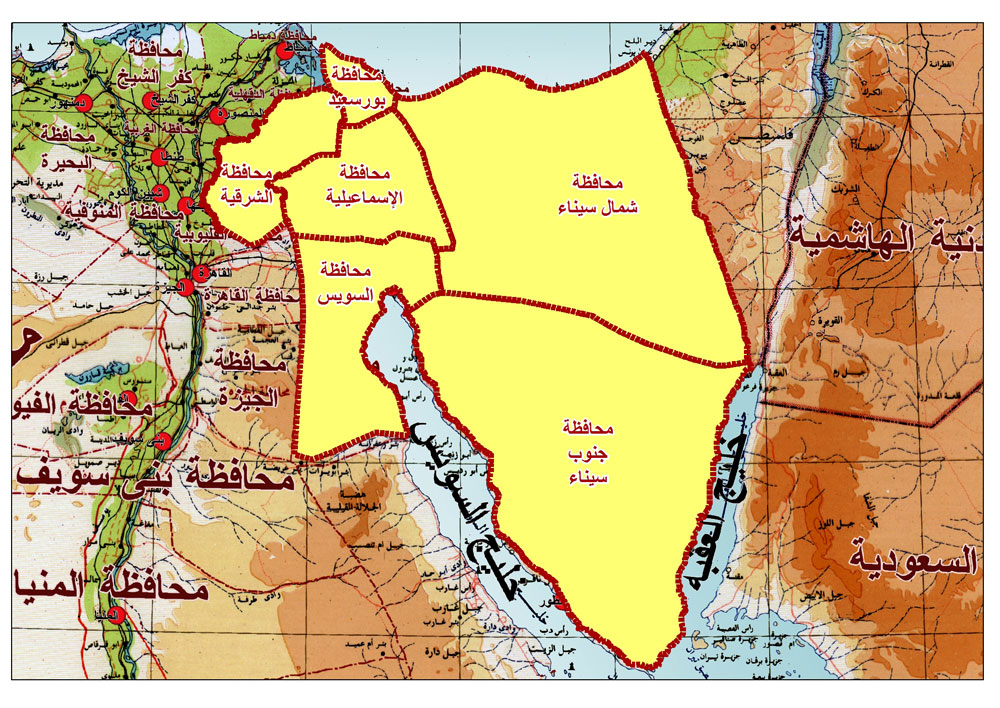
Suez Canal Region

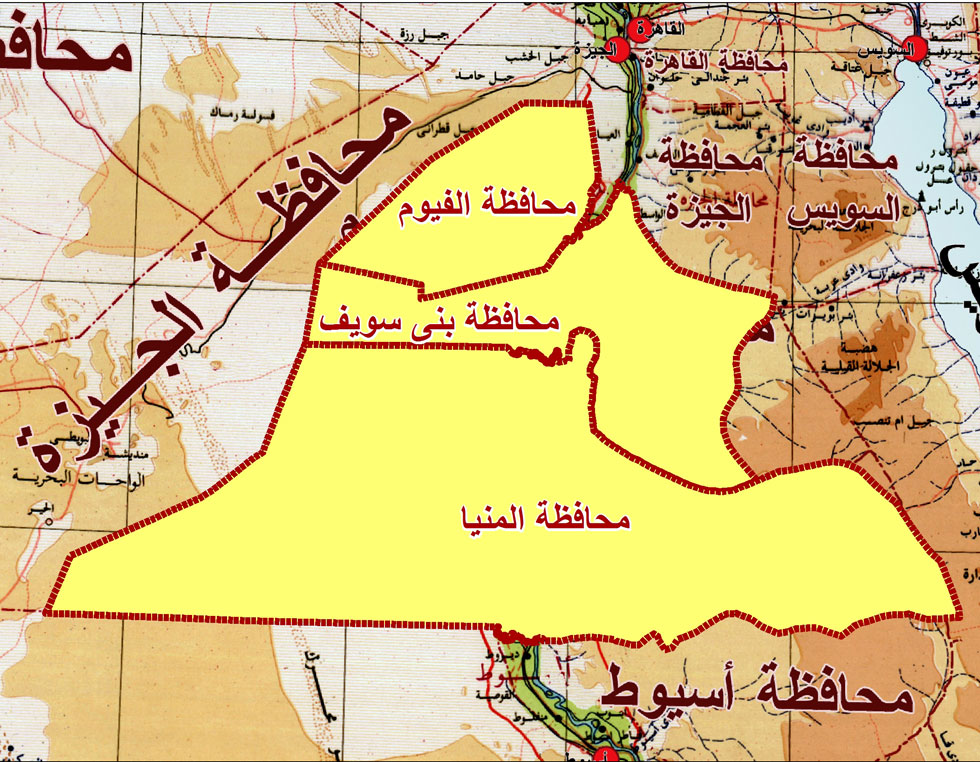
North Upper Egypt Region

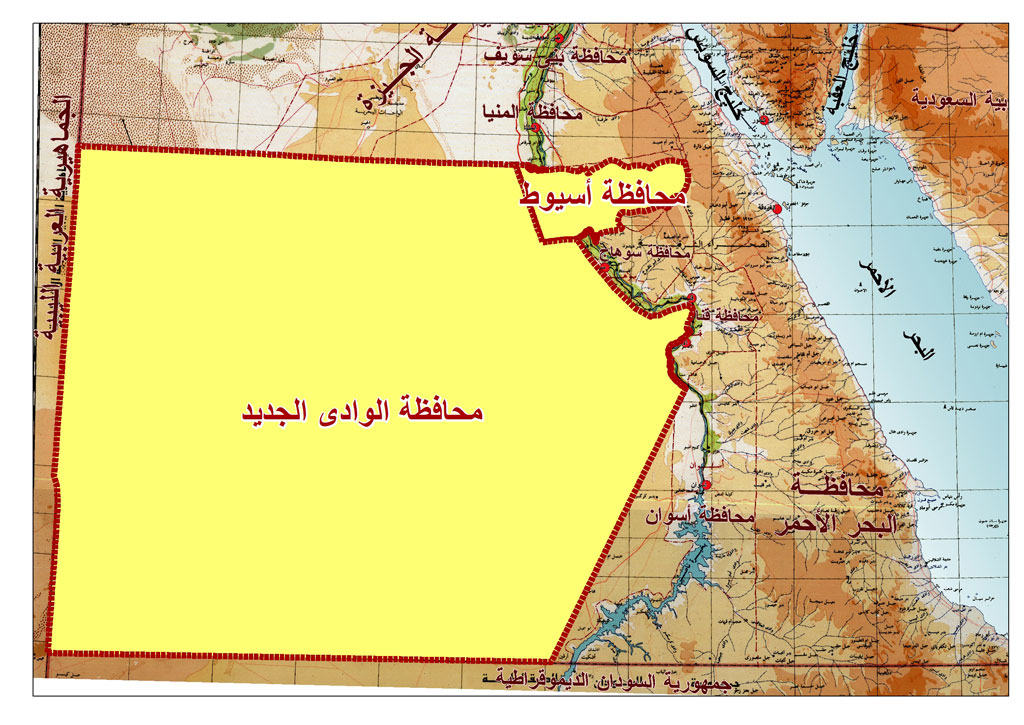
Central Upper Egypt Region

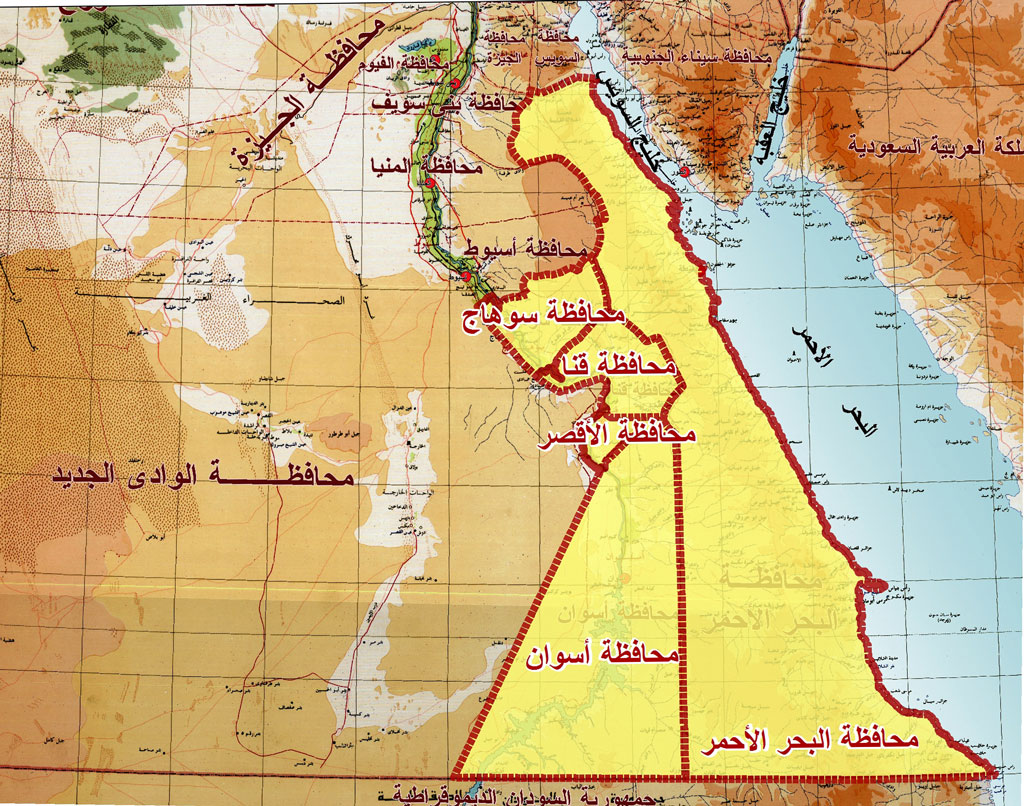
South Upper Egypt Region

== See also ==
- Economy of Egypt
- Local Government of Egypt
- Subdivisions of Egypt
