= Shiyakha =

Administrative unit in Egypt

A shiyakha (Note: Also spelled shiyakhah or sheyakha(h).) (Arabic: شياخة, romanized: šiyāḵa, lit. 'sheikhdom, jurisdiction of a sheikh') is the Arabic language term for a fourth-layer subdivision of Egypt.

== Sources ==
- Horwood, Chris (2011). Cairo.
