= Teil tree =

Historical name for some trees

The Easton's Bible Dictionary (1897) says that Teil tree is an old name for the linden tree, the tilia (also known as "lime tree" in the UK).

The Oxford English Dictionary gives the etymology of teil as Latin tilia and Old French (13th to 15th centuries) til. In Modern French it is tilleul. The French and Latin word cognates appeared amongst the English literate classes starting in the 14th century. Most names of trees, however, kept their Germanic origins, hence linden and lime (a deformation of lind according to the OED). The linden or til tree is native to northern Europe and Asia. In various versions of Protestant Bibles the til is sometimes confused with the terebinth, which is a tree native to southern Europe, North Africa, and the Middle East. One variety of terebinth furnishes the pistachio nut and the thick bark of the tree is a source of a highly valued varnish and particular turpentine (Modern French, térébenthine). The English and French translations in the Roman Catholic Douay Bible from the Vulgate do not confuse the two trees.

The name was used in the King James Version of the Bible for the Hebrew word "elah", a word that more modern translations translate as "terebinth" or "oak" – this seems to be the chief source of Web references to the name, but the linden tree does not grow in the Middle East in present-day where the Bible verses are describing. The translators of this version may have used "teil tree" rather than "linden" as an intention to distinguish this Middle Eastern tree (identified as a pistachio tree by Israeli philologist Avi Gold) from the similar European linden tree.
