= Plan International Egypt =

Non-governmental organization for children's rights

Plan International Egypt, also known locally as Plan Egypt, is a child right's non-governmental organization. It is part of the larger Plan International" children's rights INGO headquartered in the UK. It has no political or religious affiliations. Funding in Plan Egypt comes from a mixture of Sponsorship and grants (approximately 70% and 30% respectively). The Egypt country office is located in El-Manial al-Roda, Cairo, Egypt

Plan Egypt has been working in Egypt since 1981. In Egypt, it works directly with about 40,000 children. However, because Plan Egypt has adopted a holistic approach to child-centered community development (CCCD), it also believes in development/aid through women's empowerment, youth empowerment, education, awareness of rights, inclusion of all, in order to create an enabling environment for children.

Plan Egypt works in approximately 25 communities throughout Egypt. Specifically, the organization works in communities in 6th of October, Alexandria, Assiut, Beheira, Cairo East (al-Marg district), Cairo South, and Qalyubia.

Plan Egypt has 4 programs, more than 10 different interventions, and two campaigns which it actively implements in Egypt in various communities.

== Programs ==
=== Girls' and Women's Empowerment ===
Interventions promote gender equity communities and societies. They are designed to increase the capacity of girls and women to act collectively to address their issues and participate in community decisions; increase influence and access to services; and address discriminatory practices towards girls and women. Examples include VSLA, REFLECT literacy groups, and Girls' Education.

=== Youth Development and Leadership ===
Interventions build confidence and capacity of youth as key actors in community development and encourages them to become active citizens. Child and Youth Organizations strengthen youth's capacity to act collectively to address their own and their community's issues. Examples of interventions include Child/Youth Media, and the Forsa youth employability intervention.

=== Participation and Protection of Least Advantaged Children ===
The most marginalized and vulnerable children are the first priority for programs. Strategies mobilize communities to include and support their development, such as street and working children and children with disabilities. Local organizations are strengthened to work with the least advantaged and to link with institutional stakeholders as duty bearers to provide services.

=== Active Citizenship and Civil Society Strengthening ===
Holistic development strategies strengthen local organizations and unite them to address community-wide issues and to advocate for increased service and investment from government institutions and the business sector.

== Program Interventions ==
=== Community Based Rehabilitation (CBR) ===
The Community Based Rehabilitation intervention aims to ensure that empowered people with disabilities are actively contributing to the community and building their capacity by accessing regular services and opportunities. The program is established in all Plan areas and expanding to every community.

=== Progressive Elimination of Child Labor ===
Plan Egypt's Child Labor intervention aims to progressively eliminate the worst forms of, and reduce child labor through advocacy and enhancing the capacity of government district authorities and other non- governmental stakeholders.

=== Protection of the Rights of Street Children ===
This intervention aims to reintegrate street children back into their families of communities after they have decided to live on the street. Its four main components are prevention, outreach, transition, and reintegration of street children.

=== Youth Development and Leadership ===
In 2010, approximately 7,200 youth participated in the youth organization related activities. This intervention is designed to encourage youth to take actions which promote their rights

=== Forsa Youth Employability ===
"Forsa" means "opportunity" in Arabic. Forsa is a program which is designed to train youth with the skills they need to find employment in the current Egyptian labor market conditions. Forsa is implemented by Plan Egypt staff and provides youth with skills in English reading and writing, computer literacy, nursing, cleaning, and generally, the skills that all employers look for such as reliability, responsibility, commitment, and punctuality.

Forsa was created for any youth who wish to join regardless of them being or having been part of the Plan Child Sponsorship program. It was created as an extension of the rights-based interventions for children, yet has a more practical, hands-on approach.

=== Girls' and Women's Empowerment ===
This intervention address issues like Harmful Traditional Practices (HTP) and Female Genital Mutilation/Cutting (FGM/C) which is a common practice against girls in Egypt. Generally speaking, it advocates for women's rights at a local and national level. It can be partnered through/with interventions such as VSLA and REFLECT.

=== Community Learning ===
Plan Egypt's Community Learning program seeks to ensure that children, youth, and adults acquire basic learning and life skills. This can be achieved by introducing forms of community based education for all community members, especially those who are not enrolled in the formal education system or have dropped out of it. In 2008 Plan Egypt started the implementation of this intervention and has been able to support more than 29 Community schools in Kalubeya, Cairo South, Cairo East, Beheira, and 6 October. This has enabled more than 1,000 dropout girls –who live in rural and slum areas– to have a second chance to continue their education.

=== REFLECT – Literacy ===
The REFLECT methodology combines group literacy classes with community empowerment. By strengthening people's ability to communicate, REFLECT improves their meaningful decision making in issues relevant to their lives. In 2010 56 REFLECT circles were initiated. A total number of 600 women have been participating in these circles. Plan Egypt has trained over 40 REFLECT facilitators from local communities. The main partners of Plan Egypt in implementing the REFLECT intervention has been local Community Development Associations in every REFLECT community. The Adult Education Agency has also participated in facilitator trainings and provided for the payment of local facilitators.

=== Village Savings and Loan Associations (VSLA) or "Zeyada" ===
The VSLA, or "Zeyada" intervention is based on group self-empowerment through savings and loans. It uses microfinance concepts in order to provide marginalized groups with access to loans and credit. In Plan Egypt communities, groups (73% women) will gather once a week or more, in order to buy shares (adding money to the pool of potential loans), discuss issues in their communities, discuss potential income Generating Projects. These activities have been carried out in Egypt in partnership with Barclays Bank and CARE (another NGO working in Egypt).

Since 2008, more than 1,400 VSLA groups have been formed (about 14,000 members) in all Plan working areas. Total savings is currently over E£900,000 with more than 2,500 loans.

=== Early Childhood Care and Development (ECCD) ===
The ECCD intervention provides activities serving mothers and children aged 5 or less. These activities aim to improve the knowledge and capabilities of caregivers and service providers, specifically, information concerning children's health, nutrition, and socio-emotional development.

=== Aflatoun ===
Aflatoun aims to create awareness about the social and economic rights of children, facilitate the inclusion of child social and financial education into formal and informal education, and to create a culture of savings and financial management among children. By 2010, the Aflatoun curriculum was operating in 7 governorates with over 160 children groups. Plan Egypt succeeded in developing a strategy with the NCCM for their collaboration in the implementation of the program.

=== Advocacy ===
Advocacy constitutes a key strategy for Plan Egypt in order to influence policy change and resource allocation in the promotion of children's rights. Most of our advocacy strategies start at the community level by creating awareness of children's rights issues, promoting alliances with local organizations that will develop a plan and a strategy that identifies channels to claim those rights.

=== Child Protection ===
This policy puts forth the commitment of all staff, stakeholders, and partners to protect children and adolescents through its program interventions as well as through its organization.

== Campaigns ==
=== Learn Without Fear ===
Learn Without Fear is campaign led by children and youth in communities aiming to promote child friendly schools where they are able to learn and enjoy their rights to protection and participation. Unfortunately, beating corporal punishment is still widespread in Egyptian schools. Plan Egypt works with teachers, parents and district education authorities towards positive and non-harmful ways of disciplining children. Plan Egypt also participated in the piloting of the Child Helpline for denouncing violence in Egypt.

=== Because I am a Girl (BIAAG) ===
BIAAG is a campaign designed to fight gender inequality, promote girls’ rights and lift millions of girls out of poverty.
