= Housing and Building National Research Center =

Government housing agency in Egypt

Coordinates: 30.036848°N 31.206705°E

The Housing and Building National Research Center (HBRC; in Arabic: المركز القومي لبحوث الإسكان والبناء) is an Egyptian agency affiliated to the Ministry of Housing, Utilities & Urban Communities.

== History ==
On 21 June 1954, a cooperation agreement on the establishment of the Institute for building research in cooperation with the Department of Foreign Affairs of the United States of America government was signed. Act No. 495 was issued on 23 September 1954 to establish the Institute for building research in Egypt as an independent organization.
In 1971, decision number 1871 was issued from the Prime Minister stating the affiliation of the Institute to the Ministry of Housing, Utilities and Urban Development.
On 16 February 2005, two presidential decrees No. 63 and No. 64 for the year 2005 were issued to reorganize the Housing and Building Center and its name become Housing and Building National Research Center affiliated to the Minister of Housing, Utilities and Urban Development.

== HBRC institutes ==
- Building Materials and Quality Control Research Institute
- Concrete Construction Research Institute
- Structure and Metallic Construction Research Institute
- Soil Mechanics and Geo-technical Engineering Research Institute
- Sanitary and Environmental Engineering Research Institute
- Construction Engineering and Construction Management Research Institute
- Architecture and Housing Research Institute
- Raw Materials and Technological Processing Research Institute
- Building Physics and Environment Research Institute
- Electro-mechanical Research Institute
- The Urban Training and Studies Institute (UTI)
