= Basil El-Baz =

Egyptian businessman

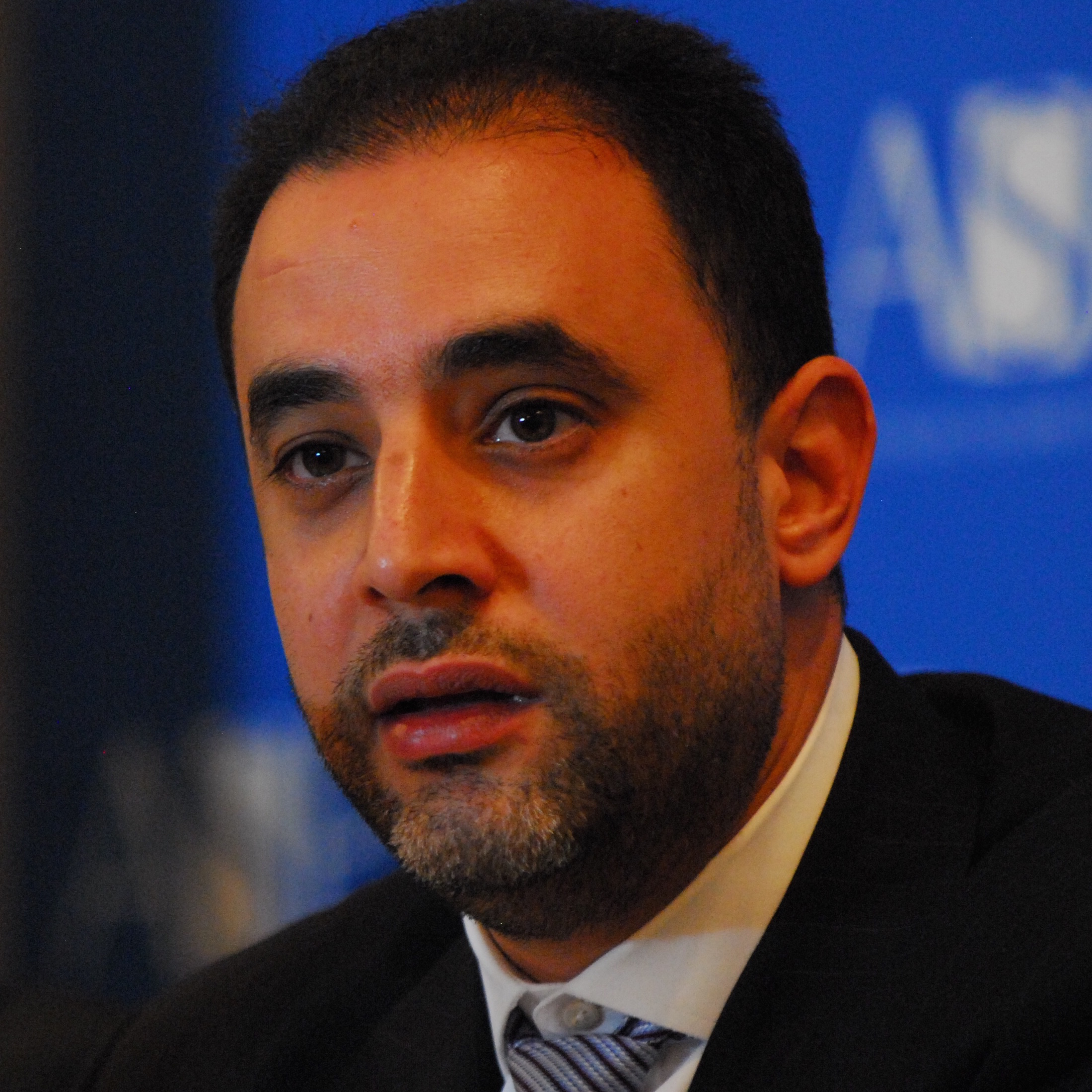
- Education: Harvard University
- Occupation: Industrial entrepreneur
- Employer: Carbon Holdings

Basil El-Baz is an Egyptian industrialist, entrepreneur and business executive serving as chairman and chief executive officer of Carbon Holdings, a mid-to-downstream oil and gas development company.

== Background ==
While studying government and economics at Harvard University, El-Baz developed the concept for building an ammonia plant in Egypt, which ultimately became Egypt Basic Industries Corporation (EBIC). He submitted a feasibility study on this concept and was awarded a grant by the United States Trade and Development Agency to conduct further studies.

El-Baz has developed and financed two major industrial greenfield projects in Egypt, Egypt Basic Industries Corporation (EBIC) and Egypt Hydrocarbon Corporation (EHC). EBIC is the only project to receive a comprehensive loan guarantee from the Export – Import Bank of the United States. Furthermore, EBIC is one of a select number of projects in Egypt to be financed entirely by consortium of international banks. The project had an approximate value of US$650 million at closing. EBIC is the 6th largest global exporter of ammonia. EBIC was eventually sold to Orascom Construction Industries.

Carbon Holdings’ second project, Egypt Hydrocarbon Corporation (EHC), with a transaction value of approximately US$550 million is considered as the first major industrial project to close in post-revolution Egypt. Construction of the second project commenced in August 2011.

Carbon Holdings is developing the approximate of US$11 billion Naphtha Cracker and Polyethylene Complex project named Tahrir Petrochemicals Corporation (TPC). Originally the project was expected to be completed in 2017, but was delayed for different reasons. The work has started in July 2019.

== Awards ==
- El-Baz was awarded Africa Entrepreneur of the Year 2016. He is the first Egyptian entrepreneur to receive such an honor. The award was announced at the Africa-France Economic Forum at the 27th Africa-France Summit held in Bamako, Mali on 13 January 2017. The Business Africa Entrepreneur Awards, in connection with Business Africa, and in partnership with MEDEF (Mouvement Des Enterprise De France) and Institut Choiseul.
- Ranked by Institut Choiseul as the 12th in their annual top 100 African business leaders in 2016, which is an annual study independently carried out by Paris-based Institut Choiseul that identifies and ranks the young African business economic leaders aged 40 years old and below. The study by Choiseul intends to highlight those women and men who play a major role in the continent's economic development.

== Appointments and memberships ==
- Member of the board of trustees for the “Tahya Misr” (Long Live Egypt) Fund / 2014–present
- Co-chair – Energy Committee – American Chamber of Commerce in Egypt (AmCham)
