= Ministry of Housing, Utilities & Urban Communities =

Government ministry of Egypt

Arab Republic of Egypt Ministry of Housing, Utilities & Urban Communities
- وزارة الاسكان والمرافق والمجتمعات العمرانية
- Emblem of Egypt

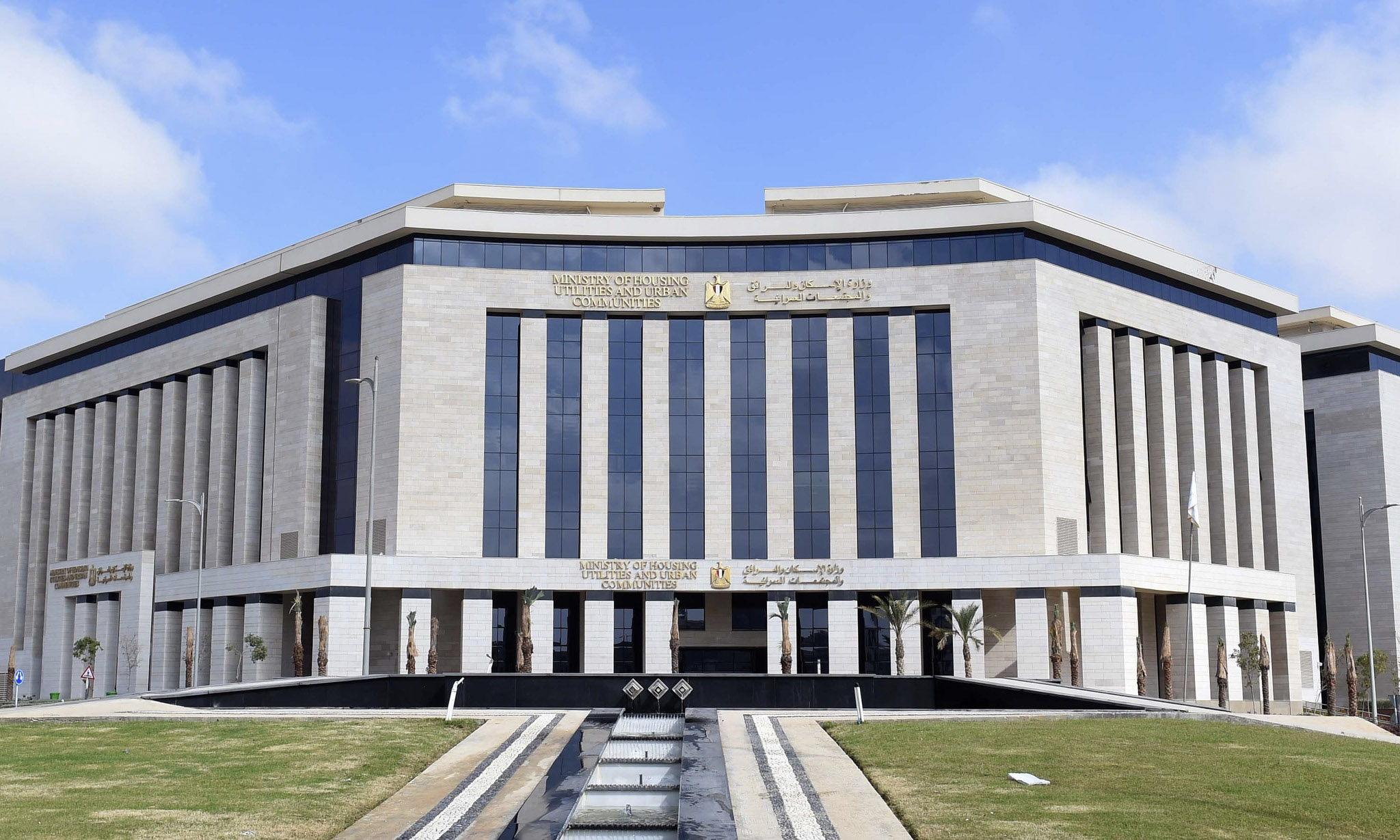
- The Ministry building in The New Capital

Agency overview
- Jurisdiction: Government of Egypt
- Headquarters: The New Capital
- Agency executive: Randa El-Menshawy, Minister
- Website: Official website

Ministry of Housing, Utilities and Urban Communities (MoHUUC) is responsible for addressing Egypt's housing issues, with a mandate to provide public housing, drinking water and wastewater treatment utilities, and the planning and subdivision of new urban communities. It is headquartered in Cairo since its inception in 1961, and administers the nation's largest real estate developer, the New Urban Communities Authority, and the largest contractor, the Arab Contractors.

== History ==
=== 1950-1961 ===
As the government started taking a serious interest in public housing in the later 1940s, on 17 August, 1950, the first official office for housing, the Department of Popular Homes (Idarat al-masakin al-sha'biya), was established within the Ministry of Social Affairs. When public housing production expanded in the 1950s, it was renamed as the Department of Housing and moved to the Ministry of Municipal and Village Affairs. It was only in 1961, after a large scale restructuring of government offices, was the Ministry of Housing and Utilities established as an independent office.

=== 1974-1980 ===
In the wake of the 1973 October War, efforts to rebuild the Suez Canal cities were put in motion by establishing the Ministry of Reconstruction (wizarat al-ta'mir), in parallel to the Ministry of Housing and Utilities. However, they would be merged within months to become the Ministry of Housing and Reconstruction.

With the expansion of official policy in establishing new communities all over Egypt, and not just the canal region, a Ministry of Reconstruction and New communities was spun off in 1978, in addition to a Ministry of State for Housing, as well as keeping the Ministry of Housing, though the Ministry of State was scrapped within a year. In 1979, the New Urban Communities Authority, or NUCA, was established as a state owned enterprise to implement these activities and its chairman is appointed by the president. NUCA was originally affiliated to the cabinet, and its board included the ministers of economics, finance, housing and reconstruction, electricity, irrigation, land reclamation, and industry and natural resources.

In 1980, with the devolution of public housing to the local administration, and expansion in desert agriculture, the cabinet level office was restructured as the Ministry of Reconstruction, State for Housing, and Land Reclamation.

=== 1996- Present ===
In 1996, the office was restructured yet again, and the two ministries merged into the Ministry of Housing, Utilities and Urban Communities, while its roles were defined as:

- Oversee town and village planning, and housing projects in accordance with the policies of the state
- Plan and implement public utility (water and wastewater) projects
- Prepare comprehensive regional plans, prioritizing economic and social benefits to the Egyptian people
- Work in the development of new cities and villages

This set up has remained much the same since, with the exception of a brief renaming as the Ministry of Housing, Utilities and Urban Development, and then a three year split into the Ministry of Housing and Urban Communities and the Ministry of Utilities responsible for the water and wastewater portfolio. Though on the 19 of September 2015, they were again merged into the Ministry of Housing, Utilities and Urban Communities.

== Ministers ==
- Randa El-Menshawy (since 2026)
- Sharif El-Sherbini (2024 – 2026)
- Assem al-Gazzar (2019 — 2024)
- Mostafa Madbouly (2014 — 2019)
- Ahmed aboelenein (2013 — 2014)
- Tarek Wafiq (2012 — 2013)
- Mohamed Fathy al-Baradie (2011 — 2012)
- Ahmed al-Maghraby (2006 — 2011)
- Mohamed Ibrahim Soliman (1993 — 2006)
- Hassaballah al-Kafrawy (1977 — 1993)
- Osman Ahmed Osman (1974 — 1977, Minister of Reconstruction from 1973 until merger with housing)
- Ali al-Sayid Mohamed (1971 — 1974)
- Hassan Hassan Mostafa (1970 — 1971)
- Mohamed Abu Nosseir (1964 — ?), and Ibrahim Naguib Ibrahim as deputy.
- Ali al-Meligi Massoud (1952 — 1961, as Department of Popular Homes)
- Mahmoud Riad (1950 — 1952, as Department of Popular Homes)

== Affiliate Organisations ==
=== Housing Agencies ===
- Social Housing and Mortgage Finance Fund (SHMFF)
- General Organisation for Cooperative Housing (GOCH)
- Cooperative Housing Central Union (CHCU)
- Executive Agency for Joint Projects
- Ministry of Reconstruction Housing Fund

=== Real Estate and Construction ===
- Arab Contractors
- Central Agency for Reconstruction
- New Urban Communities Authority
  - City Edge Developments (84%)
  - Hyde Park Developments (78%)
  - Housing and Development Bank (Listed, 50%)
  - Saudi Egyptian Developers (50%)
  - Administrative Capital for Urban Development - ACUD (49%)

=== Utilities ===
- Holding Company for Water and Wastewater (HCWW)
- National Authority for Potable Water and Wastewater (NOPWASD)
- Executive Agency for Water and Wastewater (EAWW)

=== Think Tanks and Oversight Bodies ===
- General Organisation for Physical Planning (GOPP)
- Housing and Building National Research Center (HBRC)
- Technical Oversight on Construction Agency
- Egyptian Water Regulatory Agency (EWRA)

== See also ==
- Cabinet of Egypt
- Construction industry in Egypt
- Economic Regions of Egypt
- Greater Cairo Planning Commission
