= General Organization for Physical Planning =

The General Organization for Physical Planning (GOPP) is Egypt's national level regional planning body and is affiliated to the Ministry of Housing, Utilities and Urban Communities.

== History ==
The GOPP started life in 1965 as the Greater Cairo Planning Commission or GCPC as a planning body for the Greater Cairo metropolis.

It has been said the body has often set unrealistic goals such as to "halve the population of a city".

As the government gave more importance to planning outside of the capital, the GCPC was elevated from a regional to a national planning body in 1973, becoming the General Organization of Physical Planning (GOPP) by Presidential Decree 1093/1973, making it responsible for drawing national policies for sustainable urban planning and development.

In 2008, with the founding of the Cabinet level Supreme Council for Planning and Urban Development (SCPUD), the GOPP became its technical office, furnishing it with expertise, though still being a part of the ministry of housing.

== Examples of work ==
The GOPP works on preparing national plans, regional plans, strategic masterplans for cities, as well as urban plans for towns and villages across the country.

It has produced a series of masterplans for Greater Cairo, including the infamous Cairo 2050/2052 plan, that faced immediate criticism for its top-down mandates delivered as megaprojects that promised to displace large numbers of residents in an effort to turn Cairo into a "global city."

On a regional level, the GOPP produced the Egypt 2052 Urban Development Plan, chief among its aims is doubling the size of inhabited land to 14% by building more new towns and land reclamation schemes in the desert, as a measure to curb what it believes to be high population densities in the existing cities and villages on the Nile Valley and Delta.

The GOPP also partners with international organisations working to support urban planning and housing in Egypt including the United Nations Development Program (UNDP).
