= First Madbouly Cabinet =

Government of Egypt from 2018 to 2024

Madbouly Cabinet
- Cabinet of Egypt

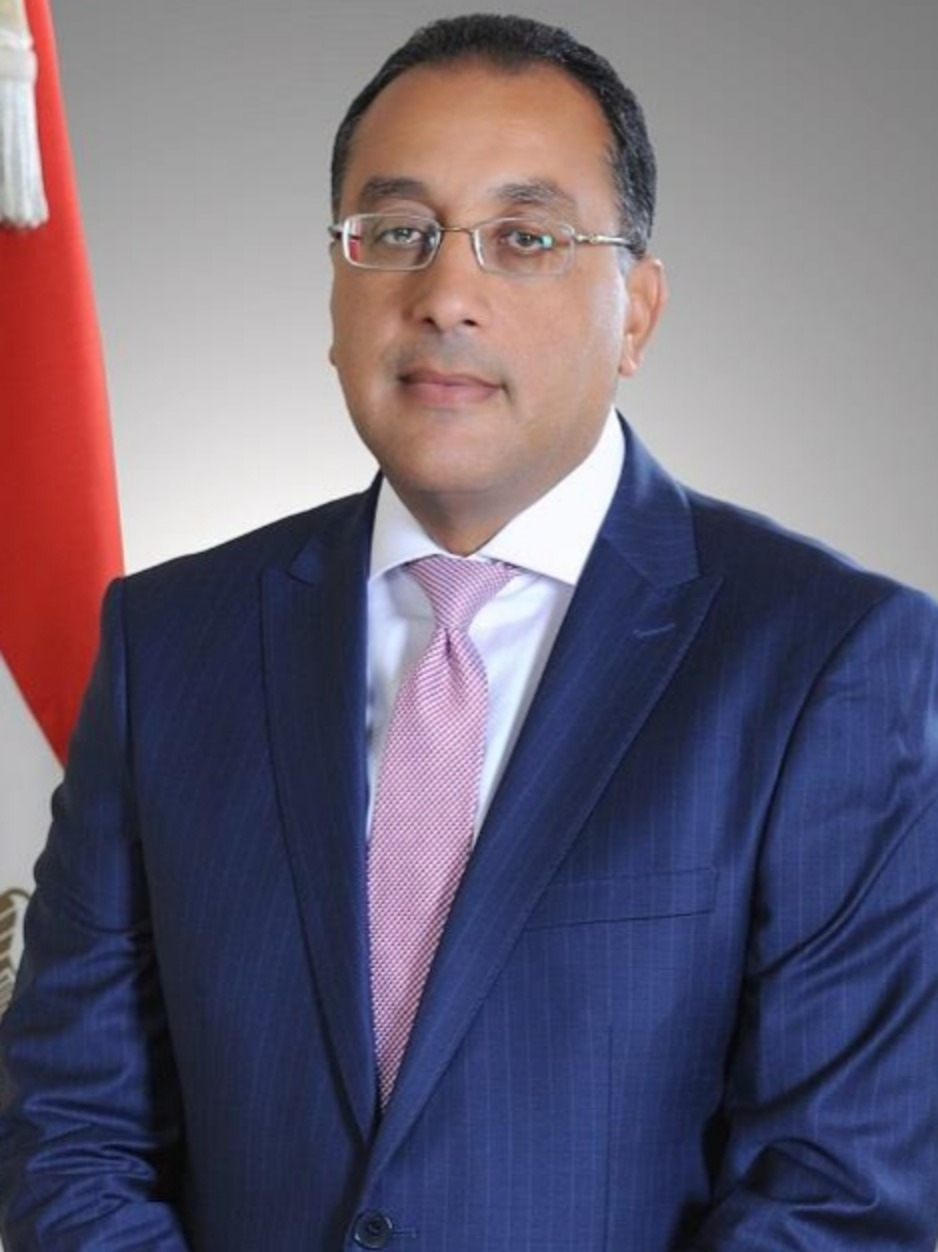
- Date formed: 7 June 2018
- Date dissolved: 3 July 2024

People and organisations
- President: Abdel Fattah el-Sisi
- Prime Minister: Mostafa Madbouly
- Member party: Independent; Supported by: Nation's Future Party
- Status in legislature: Majority

History
- Election: 2020 parliamentary election
- Predecessor: Ismail Cabinet
- Successor: Second Madbouly Cabinet

The cabinet of Egyptian prime minister Mostafa Madbouly was sworn in on 14 June 2018, a week after Madbouly was chosen to head it.

== Composition ==
| Portfolio | Minister | Took office | Left office | Party |
|---|---|---|---|---|
| Prime Minister | Mostafa Madbouly | 7 June 2018 | 3 July 2024 | Independent |
| Deputy Prime Minister; Minister of Transportation; Minister of Industry | Kamel al-Wazir | 7 June 2018 | 3 July 2024 | Independent |
| Ministry of Defense | Mohamed Ahmed Zaki | 7 June 2018 | 3 July 2024 | Military |
| Minister of Investment and International Cooperation | Rania Al-Mashat | 7 June 2018 | 3 July 2024 | Independent |
| Minister of Education | Tarek Shawki | 7 June 2018 | 3 July 2024 | Independent |
| Minister of Higher Education and Scientific Research | Mohamed Ayman Ashour | 7 June 2018 | 3 July 2024 | Independent |
| Ministry of Interior | Mahmoud Tawfik | 7 June 2018 | 3 July 2024 | Independent |
| Minister of Foreign Affairs | Badr Abdelatty | 7 June 2018 | 3 July 2024 | Independent |
| Minister of Finance | Mohamed Maait | 7 June 2018 | 3 July 2024 | Independent |
| Minister of Environment | Manal Awad | 7 June 2018 | 3 July 2024 | Independent |
| Minister of Culture | Nevine El Kelany | 7 June 2018 | 3 July 2024 | Independent |
| Minister of Legal and Parliamentary Affairs | Alaa Fouad | 7 June 2018 | 3 July 2024 | Independent |
| Minister of Justice | Omar Marwan | 7 June 2018 | 3 July 2024 | Independent |
| Minister of Electricity and Energy | Mohamed Shaker El-Markabi | 7 June 2018 | 3 July 2024 | Independent |
| Minister of Agriculture and Land Reclamation | El Sayed El Quseir | 7 June 2018 | 3 July 2024 | Independent |
| Minister of Communications and Information Technology | Amr Talaat | 7 June 2018 | 3 July 2024 | Independent |
| Minister of Petroleum and Mineral Resources | Tarek El-Molla | 7 June 2018 | 3 July 2024 | Independent |
| Minister of Water Resources and Irrigation | Hani Sewilam | 7 June 2018 | 3 July 2024 | Independent |
| Minister of Housing and Urban Development | Mostafa Madbouly | 7 June 2018 | 14 February 2019 | Independent |
| Minister of Housing and Urban Development | Assem el Gazzar | 14 February 2019 | 3 July 2024 | Independent |
| Minister of Supply and Internal Trade | Ali al-Moselhi | 7 June 2018 | 3 July 2024 | Independent |
| Minister of Military Production | Mohamed Salah Mostafa | 7 June 2018 | 3 July 2024 | Military |
| Minister of Planning and Economic Development | Rania Al-Mashat | 7 June 2018 | 3 July 2024 | Independent |
| Minister of Higher Education | Mohamed Ayman Ashour | 7 June 2018 | 3 July 2024 | Independent |
| Minister of Supply and Internal Trade | Mohamed Abou Zeid | 7 June 2018 | 3 July 2024 | Independent |
| Minister of Manpower | Hassan Mohamed Shehata | 7 June 2018 | 3 July 2024 | Independent |
| Minister of Emigration and Expatriates Affairs | Soha Gendi | 7 June 2018 | 3 July 2024 | Independent |
| Minister of Religious Endowments | Osama al-Azhari | 7 June 2018 | 3 July 2024 | Independent |
| Minister of Health and Population | Khaled Abdel Ghaffar | 7 June 2018 | 3 July 2024 | Independent |
| Minister of Civil Aviation | Mohamed Abbas Helmy | 7 June 2018 | 3 July 2024 | Military |
| Minister of Social Solidarity | Nevine el-Kabbaj | 7 June 2018 | 3 July 2024 | Independent |
| Minister of Tourism and Antiquities | Ahmed Issa | 7 June 2018 | 3 July 2024 | Independent |
| Minister of State for Youth and Sports | Ashraf Sobhy | 7 June 2018 | 3 July 2024 | Independent |
| Minister of State for Military Production | Mohamed Salah Mostafa | 7 June 2018 | 3 July 2024 | Independent |
| Minister of State for Local Development | Hisham Amna | 7 June 2018 | 3 July 2024 | Independent |
| Minister of the Public Sector | Mahmoud Esmat | 7 June 2018 | 3 July 2024 | Independent |
