= Ismail Cabinet =

Egyptian government (2015–2018)

Sherif Ismail Cabinet
- Cabinet of Egypt
- Incumbent
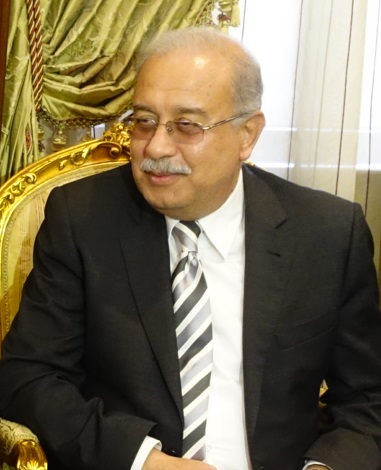
- Date formed: 19 September 2015
- Date dissolved: 7 June 2018

People and organisations
- Head of state: Abdel Fattah el-Sisi
- Head of government: Sherif Ismail
- Member party: Independent; Supported by: Egypt Party

History
- Predecessor: Third Mahlab Cabinet
- Successor: Madbouly Cabinet

The cabinet of Egyptian Prime Minister Sherif Ismail was formed on 19 September 2015.

== Cabinet members ==
Office	Name	Party
Prime Minister	Sherif Ismail	Independent
Minister of Defence	Sedki Sobhy	Military
Minister of International Cooperation	Sahar Nasr	Independent
Minister of Higher Education and Scientific Research	Khaled Abdel-Ghaffar	Independent
Minister of Interior	Magdi Abdel-Ghaffar	Independent
Minister of Foreign Affairs	Sameh Shoukry	Independent
Minister of Finance	Hani Qadri Demian	Independent
Minister of Environment	Khaled Fahmy	Independent
Minister of Culture	Helmy Namnam	Independent
Ministry of Legal and Parliamentary Affairs	Magdy al-Agaty	Independent
Minister of Justice	Mohamed Hossam	Independent
Minister of Transportation	Saad el Geyoushi	Independent
Minister of Electricity and Energy	Mohamed Shaker	Independent
Minister of Tourism	Hisham Zazou	Independent
Ministry of Agriculture and Land Reclamation	Essam Fayed	Independent
Minister of Communications and Information Technology	Yasser el Qady	Independent
Minister of Petroleum	Tareq el Molla	Independent
Minister of Water Resources and Irrigation	Hossam Moghazy	Independent
Minister of Housing, Utilities and Urban Development	Mostafa Madbouly	Independent
Minister of Supply and Internal Trade	Khaled Hanafy	Independent
Minister of Manpower	Gamal Sorour	Independent
Minister of Immigration and Expatriates Affairs	Nabila Makram	Independent
Minister of Religious Endowment (Awqaf)	Mukhtar Gomaa	Independent
Minister of Health and Population	Ahmed Rady	Independent
Minister of Civil Aviation	Mohammed Hassan Kamal	Independent
Minister of Social Solidarity	Ghada Waly	Independent
Minister of Planning and Administrative Reform	Ashraf El-Araby	Independent
Minister of Industry, Trade and Small Industries	Tareq Qabil	Independent
Minister of Investment	Ashraf Salman	Independent
Minister of Technical Training and Education	El Helali el Sherbini	Independent
Minister of State for Youth and Sports	Khaled Abdel Aziz	Egypt Party
Minister of State for Military Production	Mohammed el Assar	Independent
Minister of State for Local Development	Ahmed Zaki Badr	Independent
Minister of State of Antiquities	Mamdouh Eldamaty	Independent
