= Beso =

Beso may refer to:

- "Beso" (Elvana Gjata song), 2013
- "Beso" (song)", by Rosalía and Rauw Alejandro, 2023
- Beso, or beso-beso, a form of cheek kissing in the Philippines
- Beso, nickname of Georgian revolutionary and Soviet politician Vissarion Lominadze
- Beso (footballer), nickname of Egyptian footballer Mohamed Ahmed

== See also ==
- "Un Beso", a 2005 single from Aventura
- El Beso (disambiguation)
