= Yasmine Fouad =

Egyptian politician

- ياسمين فؤاد
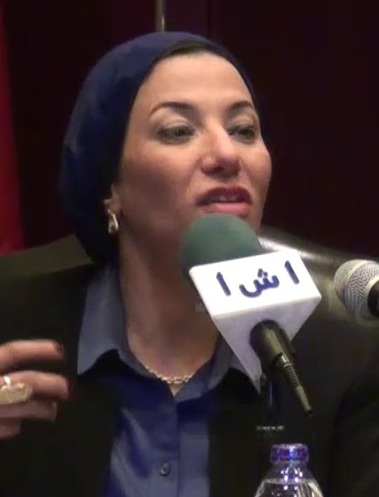

UNCCD Executive Secretary
- Incumbent
- Assumed office 2025
- Preceded by: Ibrahim Thiaw

Minister of Environment
- In office 18 June 2018 – 2025
- President: Abdel Fattah el-Sisi
- Prime Minister: Mostafa Madbouly

Personal details
- Born: March 1975
- Education: Cairo University

Yasmine Salah El-Din Fouad Abdel Aziz is an Egyptian politician who has been serving as Executive Secretary of the United Nations Convention to Combat Desertification (UNCCD) since 2025. She previously was the Minister of Environment in Mostafa Madbouly's ministry from 2018 to 2025.

== Early life and education ==
Fouad holds a PhD in Euro-Mediterranean studies from Cairo University and a MSc in environmental science from Ain Shams University.

== Political career ==
During her time as minister, Fouad co-chaired the New Partnership for Africa's Development (NEPAD) Regional Flagship Programmes steering committee including Sustainable Land Management, Desertification, Biodiversity and Ecosystems-based Adaptation to Climate Change.

Fouad chaired the fourteenth Conference of the Parties to the Convention on Biological Diversity (2018–2021) and the 2022 United Nations Climate Change Conference in Sharm el-Sheikh (2021–2022).
