= Arrawda =

Al-rawda الروضة
- city
- Location in Egypt
- Coordinates: 31.32336°N 31.76122°E
- Country: Egypt
- Governorate: Damietta

Population (2018)
  - Total: 29,592
- Time zone: UTC+2 (EET)
  - Summer (DST): UTC+3 (EEST)

Arrawda (Arabic: الروضة) is a city in the Damietta Governorate, Egypt. Its population was estimated at 29,600 people in 2018. It was formerly known as 'Ezbet El-Hagah' before it changed to Al-Rawdah in 1931 and was converted to a city in 1990. The majority of its residents work in agriculture, as well as fishing, trade, and handicrafts. One of its most notable figures is Diaa El-Din Dawood, a former minister and politician.
