= Ministry of Health and Population =

Ministry of Health and Population may refer to:

- Ministry of Health and Population (Egypt)
- Ministry of Health and Population (Nepal)
