= Assarw =

Assarw السرو
- City
- Location in Egypt
- Coordinates: 31.23867°N 31.65379°E
- Country: Egypt
- Governorate: Damietta

Population (2018)
  - Total: 27,743
- Time zone: UTC+2 (EET)
  - Summer (DST): UTC+3 (EEST)

Assarw (Arabic: السرو) is a city in the Damietta Governorate, Egypt. Its population was estimated at 27,700 people in 2018.

The old name of the city is Bejaja (Arabic: بججا).
