= Farag Foda =

Egyptian writer, professor, and human rights activist

Farag Foda فرج فودة
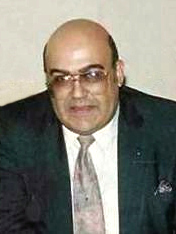
- Farag Foda in the 1980s
- Born: 20 August 1945; El Zarqa, Kingdom of Egypt
- Died: 8 June 1992 (aged 46); Nasr City, Cairo, Egypt
- Cause of death: Assassination by al-Jama'a al-Islamiyya
- Occupations: Professor, writer

Farag Foda (Arabic: فرج فودة [ˈfɑɾɑɡ ˈfoːdæ, ˈfuːdæ]; 20 August 1945 – 8 June 1992) was a prominent Egyptian professor, writer, columnist, and human rights activist.

He was assassinated on 8 June 1992 by members of the Islamist group al-Jama'a al-Islamiyya after being accused of blasphemy by a committee of scholars (ulama) at al-Azhar University.

Farag Foda was one of 202 people killed by "Islamist motivated assaults" in Egypt between March 1992 and September 1993. In December 1992, his collected works were banned.

== Biography and background ==
Farag Foda was born in El Zarqa near Damietta in the Nile Delta. He worked as professor of agriculture. He wrote numerous books, and contributed as a columnist to the Egyptian magazine October. Foda wrote during a time of Islamic revival and growing influence of Islamism, both violent and non-violent. In Iran, Islamists had overthrown the Shah in 1979.

In 1983, Hezbollah suicide bombers destroyed the barracks of the American and French troops stationed in Beirut, killing hundreds. In Egypt, some who were claiming that they had been Marxist intellectuals (such as Muhammad Imara or Tariq al-Bishri) who converted to Islamism. Long beards became common and the hijab became an obligatory norm rather than the exception in universities and government offices. In the early 1980s, Islamic radicals assassinated president Anwar Sadat and attacked Coptic Orthodox churches, homes, and shops. In some villages in which the government lacks power or authority, Copts reported extortion by way of jizya; from 1992-1998, Islamists including Islamic Group that assassinated Foda fought an insurgency against the Egyptian government during which at least 796 Egyptian policemen, soldiers, and civilians including dozens of foreign tourists were killed.

=== Views and opinions ===
Among the few who defended secularism and ‘Western’ human rights, was Farag Foda. Foda was noted for his critical articles and satires of Islamic fundamentalism in Egypt. In many newspaper articles, he pointed out (what he believed to be) weak points in Islamist ideology and its demand for Sharia law, asking how it would deal with specific problems such as the housing shortage. He specifically criticized leading Islamist figures such as Anwar al-Jundi—who had praised the secularist, anti-Muslim Brotherhood regime of Gamal Abdel-Nasser in a 1965 book—and Muhammad al-Hayyawan—a Muslim Brotherhood leader who had attributed the 1988 Armenian earthquake to God's punishment of the 'atheist' Soviet Union, but offered no explanation for the equally deadly 1990 earthquake in the Islamic Republic of Iran.

Though accused of apostasy, Foda argued he was defending Islam against its distortion by Islamists, stating "Islam is a religion and Muslims are human beings; religion is blameless, while humans make mistakes". After an Islamist periodical condemned as immoral the broadcast of the ballet Swan Lake on television, he argued that the problem lays within "the onlooker or viewer (mushahid) rather than the looked upon view or what is viewed (mushahad)" and quoted passages from a 1979 book, The Jurisprudence of Looking in Islam, which directs men to avoid looking at both women and men and, "in particular, smooth-faced boys". In a column in October magazine shortly before his death, he lamented that "the world around us is busy with the conquest of space, genetic engineering and the wonders of the computer," while Muslim scholars concern themselves with sex in paradise.

== Assassination ==
On 8 June 1992, Foda, after leaving his office, was shot dead by two assassins. His son and other bystanders were seriously wounded in the attack. The two gunmen had reportedly been "monitoring Farag Foda’s movements and watching his house in al-Nuzha area in Heliopolis for several weeks". The jihadist group Al-Gama'a al-Islamiyya announced responsibility.

Before his death, Farag Foda had been accused of blasphemy by Al-Azhar. The Al-Azhar ulama had thereby adopted a previous fatwā by Sheikh al-Azhar, Jadd al-Haqq, accusing Foda and other secularist writers of being "enemies of Islam".

In a statement claimed responsibility for the killing, Al-Gama'a al-Islamiyya accused Foda of being an apostate from Islam, advocating the separation of religion from the state, and favouring the existing legal system in Egypt rather than the application of sharia. The group explicitly referred to a religious fatwa of Al-Azhar when announcing responsibility. Eight of the thirteen Islamists brought to trial for the murder were subsequently acquitted.

One of those involved in Foda's murder, Abu El'Ela Abdrabu (Abu Al-'Ela Abd Rabbo), was released from prison in 2012 having served his sentence. In an interview which aired on Al-Arabiya TV on June 14, 2013 (as translated by MEMRI), Abdrabu defended Foda's murder, stating that "The punishment for an apostate is death, even if he repents" and that "[if] the ruler does not implement the shari'a, any of the citizens is entitled to carry out punishment of Allah." Abdrabu also stated that "Farag Foda is dead, and will receive his just desserts [sic] in the Hereafter." When asked about the feelings of Foda's children, Abdrabu accused the interviewer of using "venomous methods" against him, and then stated "let me ask you if you were not harmed by someone who cursed the Prophet and his wives? What gives you greater pain and sorrow? If you say that Farag Foda is a believer, then you should reexamine your faith."

Foda's eldest daughter Samar has rebutted the claims about her father's alleged apostasy, stating: "My father was a thinker in the full sense of the word and wholeheartedly defended moderate religion. I challenge his killers if they could spot a single text in his writings against religion."

== Published works ==
Foda wrote 12 books in Arabic:

- The Absent Truth
- Dialogue About Sharia
- The Harbinger
- Sectarianism To Where?
- Before The Fall – 1st Print 1985. 2nd Print 1995
- Dialogue About Secularism – 1st Print 1993. 2nd Print 2005
- The Warning – 1st Print 1989. 2nd Print 2005
- The Played – 1st Print 1985. 2nd Print 2004
- To Be or Not to Be – 1st Print 1988. 2nd Print 2004
- Pleasure Marriage – 1st Print 1990. 2nd Print 2004
- The Ponzi Scheme
- So the Words Will Not Be in the Air

== See also ==
- Apostasy in Islam
- Human rights in Egypt
- Terrorism in Egypt
