= Mohamed Ayman Ashour =

Egyptian politician and engineer (born 1960)

- محمد أيمن عاشور
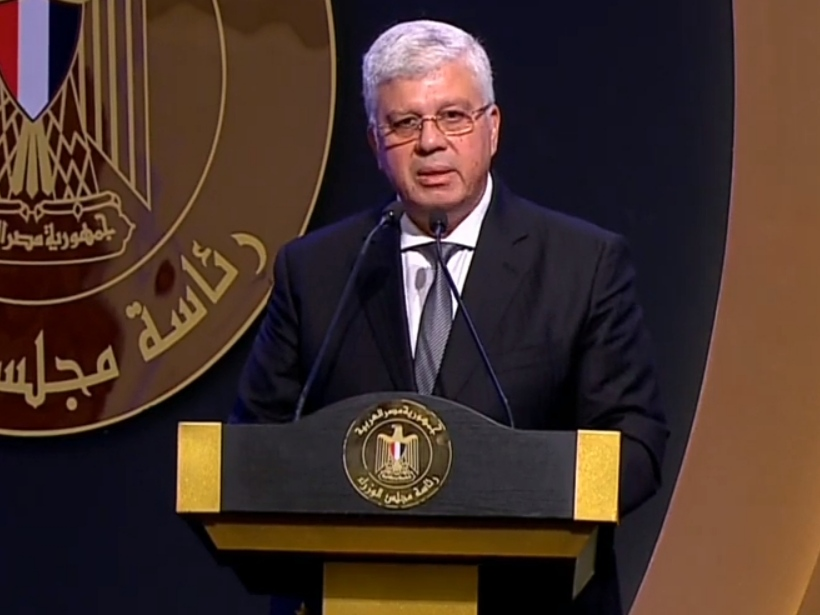

Minister of Higher Education and Scientific Research
- In office 13 August 2022 – 11 February 2026
- President: Abdel Fattah el-Sisi
- Prime Minister: Mostafa Madbouly
- Preceded by: Khaled Abdel Ghaffar
- Succeeded by: Abdul Aziz Qansouh

Personal details
- Born: 12 December 1960 (age 65) Egypt
- Education: Ain Shams University

Mohamed Ayman Ashour (Arabic: محمد أيمن عاشور; born 12 December 1960) was an Egyptian Minister of Higher Education and Scientific Research in the cabinet headed by Mostafa Madbouly.

Before appointing, Ashour had held the position of Deputy Minister of Higher Education for University Affairs. He also served as Dean of the Faculty of Engineering at Ain Shams University.
