= Ministry of Legal and Parliamentary Affairs =

Government ministry of Egypt

Arab Republic of Egypt Ministry of Legal and Parliamentary Affairs
- Emblem of Egypt

Agency overview
- Jurisdiction: Government of Egypt
- Agency executive: Omar Marwan, Minister

The Ministry of Legal and Parliamentary Affairs is the ministry in charge of transitional justice in Egypt.

== Ministers ==
- Magdy Al-Agaty from September 2015.
- Omar Marwan from February 2017

== See also ==
- Cabinet of Egypt
