= Second Madbouly Cabinet =

Egyptian government since 2018

Madbouly Cabinet
- Cabinet of Egypt

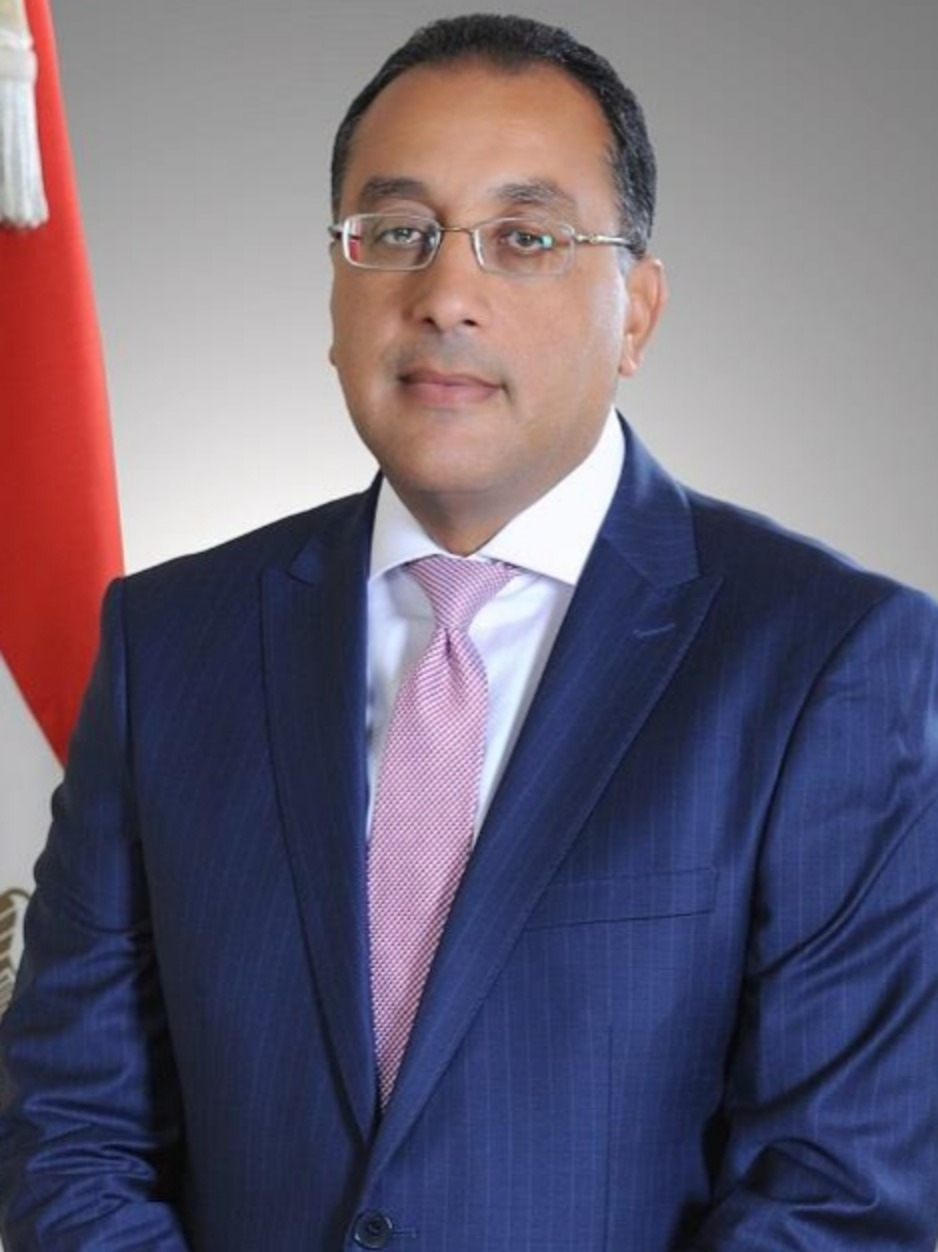
- Date formed: 3 July 2024

People and organisations
- Head of state: Abdel Fattah el-Sisi
- Head of government: Mostafa Madbouly
- Member party: Independent; Military
- Status in legislature: Majority

History
- Election: 2025
- Predecessor: First Madbouly Cabinet

The second cabinet of Egyptian prime minister Mostafa Madbouly was sworn in on 3 July 2024. The cabinet was reshuffled in February 2026.
