= Ministry of Water Resources and Irrigation =

Government ministry of Egypt

Coordinates: 30°5′29″N 31°13′35″E

Arab Republic of Egypt Ministry of Water Resources and Irrigation
- وزارة الموارد المائية والري
- Emblem of Egypt

Agency overview
- Jurisdiction: Government of Egypt
- Headquarters: Imbaba, Giza
- Agency executive: Hani Sewilam, Minister
- Website: www.mwri.gov.eg

The Ministry of Water Resources and Irrigation is the ministry in charge of managing the water resources of the Arab Republic of Egypt mainly the Nile. It also manages irrigation projects in Egypt, such as the Aswan Dam and Al-Salam Canal. Its headquarters are in Cairo.

== Ministers ==
- Prof. Dr. Hani Swilam - from August 2022 till now
- Mohamed Abdelmotaleb - from June 2013
- Hossam Moghazy - from June, 2014
- Muhammad Abdul Ati - from March, 2016

== Legislative acts ==
- Decree No. 108/1995 defines the standard and specification for clean drinking water
- Decree No. 338/1995, forbids drainage into the Nile river
- Decree No. 08/1983, protects potable and nonpotable waters
- Decree No. 649/1962, dictates the standards for liquid discharges into the river and public drainage

== Water scarcity ==
In 2014, the ministry wrote a paper titled "Water Scarcity in Egypt: The Urgent Need for Regional Cooperation among the Nile Basin Countries". In it, the ministry describes why the country doesn't have the water to meet the needs of its people.

In 2016 Egypt joined other countries in forming The Delta Coalition, an organization with the aim and purpose of dealing with climate change and water issues. The Third Delta Coalition Ministerial event was held in October, 2018 in Cairo, Egypt.

== Projects ==
The Improved Water and Sanitation Services Project (IWSP) has been ongoing, from 2008 and concludes in 2019, with aid received from France, Germany, The EU & EIB, and implemented by the Ministry of Housing, Utilities and Urban Development. This project addresses needs in Beheira, Sharqia, Gharbia, and Damietta governorates.

== See also ==
- Cabinet of Egypt
