= Manal Awad Mikhail =

Egyptian politician

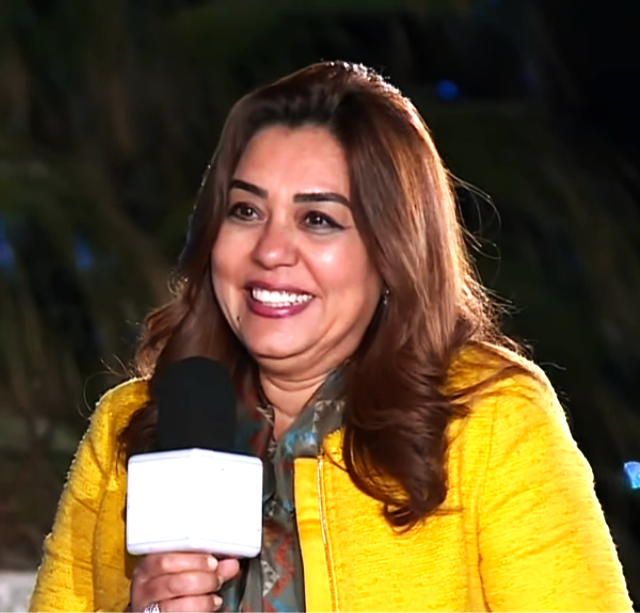
Manal Awad Mikhail in 2022

Manal Awad Mikhail is Egyptian politician who is the first female Minister of Local Development in Egypt. Before, she was the governor of Damietta, Egypt, as the first female Coptic Christian governor and second female governor in Egypt. Mikhail was the deputy governor of Giza.

== Education ==
Mikhail is a graduate of Veterinary Science from Benha University. She has a master's degree and a PhD in Natural Sciences from the University of Alexandria in 1999.
