= Muhammad Awad Tag al-Din =

Egyptian politician (born 1945)

- محمد عوض تاج الدين
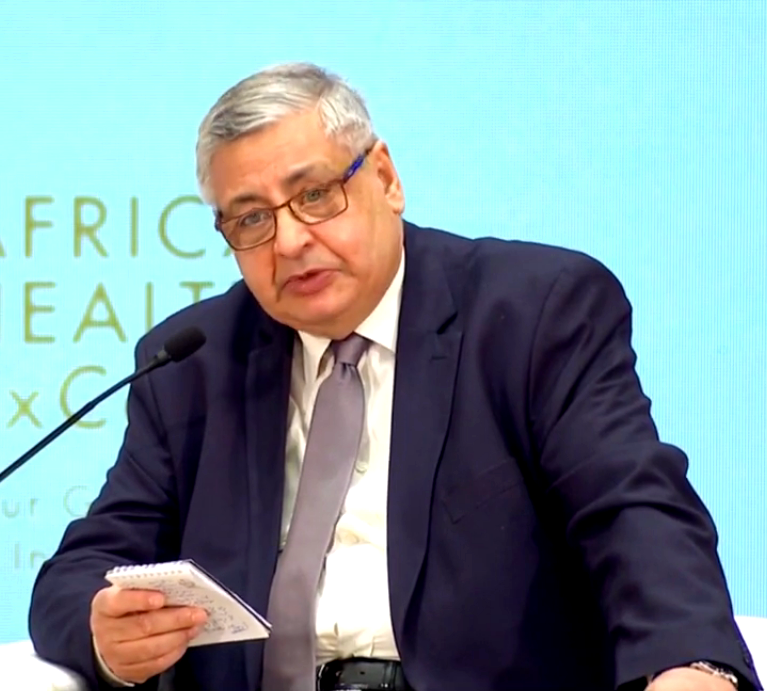

Ministry of Health and Population
- In office 3 November 2002 – 31 December 2005
- President: Hosni Mubarak
- Prime Minister: Atef Ebeid
- Preceded by: Ismail Sallam
- Succeeded by: Hatem al-Jabali

Personal details
- Born: 23 October 1945 (age 80)
- Education: Ain Shams University, faculty of Medicine

Muhammad Awad Tag al-Din (Arabic: محمد عوض تاج الدين; born 23 October 1945) was the Egyptian Minister of Health and Population from 3 November 2002 to 31 December 2005. He was also appointed as President Sisi's advisor for health and prevention affairs on 21 March 2020.
