= Hani Sewilam =

Egyptian academic

Hani Atif Nebhan Sewilam
- هاني عاطف نبهان سويلم
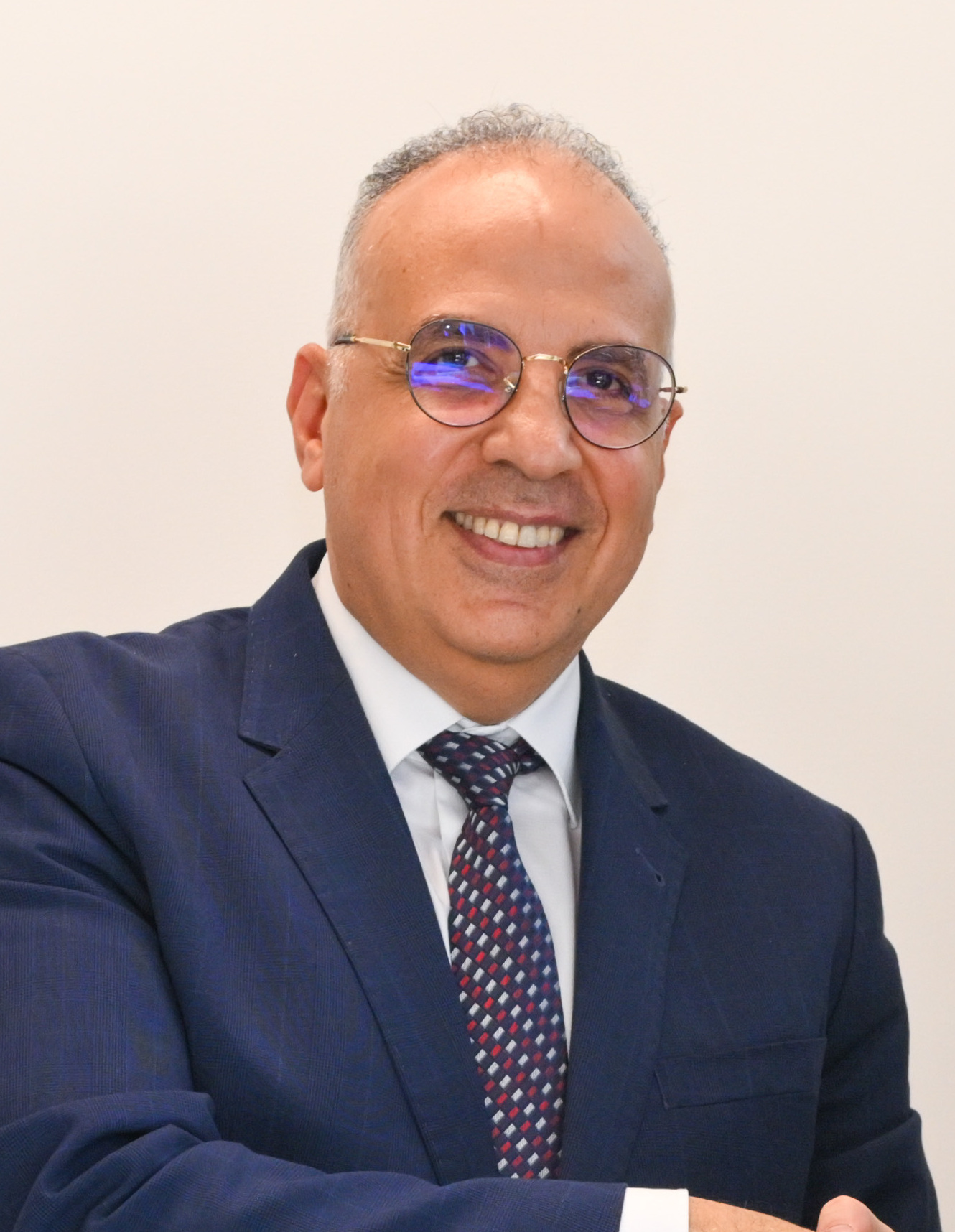
- Hani Sewilam in 2023

Minister of Water Resources and Irrigation
- Incumbent
- Assumed office 13 August 2022
- President: Abdel Fattah el-Sisi
- Prime Minister: Mostafa Madbouly
- Preceded by: Muhammad Abdul Ati

Personal details
- Born: Egypt
- Education: Faculty of engineering, Zagazig University

Hani Sewilam is an Egyptian academic and professor of Water Resources currently serving as minister of Irrigation. He was elected president of African Ministers’ Council of Water in 2023 for a two-year term. He was Deputy Head of the Academic and Research Department Engineering Hydrology and Managing Director of the UNESCO Chair of Hydrological Change and Water Resources Management at RWTH Aachen University, Germany.

== Education and career ==
Sewilam studied for a Diploma in Water Engineering and a bachelor's degree in Environmental and Irrigation Engineering in Zagazig University, Egypt. He then proceeded to University of Southampton, United Kingdom where he earned an MSc in Environmental and Irrigation Engineering and a PhD in Water Resources Management from Aachen University, Germany. His academic interest focuses on water management, hydrology, desalination and sustainable development.

Sewilam was managing director of the UNESCO Chair of Hydrological Change and Water Resources Management at RWTH Aachen University, Germany and Deputy Head of the Academic and Research Department Engineering Hydrology. Sewilam is the head of the Center for Applied Research on the Environment and Sustainability (CARES) at the American University in Cairo (AUC).

He was appointed Egyptian minister of Irrigation on 13 August 2022. On 27 February 2023, African Ministers’ Council on Water elected Sewilam president of the organization for a term of two years. he took over form Carl Hermann Schlettwein, minister of Agriculture, Water and Land Resources of Namibia.

== Award ==
Water-Energy-Food-Ecosystems (WEFE) Nexus award 2022.
