= Hatem al-Jabali =

Egyptian politician

- حاتم الجبلي

Ministry of Health and Population
- In office 31 December 2005 – 31 January 2011
- President: Hosni Mubarak
- Prime Minister: Ahmed Nazif
- Preceded by: Muhammad Awad Tag al-Din
- Succeeded by: Ahmad Samih Fareed

Personal details
- Education: Cairo University, faculty of Medicine

Hatem Mustafa al-Jabali (Arabic: حاتم مصطفى فريد) was the Egyptian Minister of health from 31 December 2005 to 31 January 2011.
