= Abdul Aziz Qansouh =

Egyptian politician

- عبد العزيز قنصوة

Minister of Higher Education and Scientific Research
- Incumbent
- Assumed office February 2026
- President: Abdel Fattah el-Sisi
- Prime Minister: Mostafa Madbouly
- Preceded by: Mohamed Ayman Ashour

Personal details
- Born: 26 September 1969 (age 56) Egypt
- Education: Alexandria University

Abdul Aziz Qansouh (Arabic: عبد العزيز قنصوة; born 26 September 1969) is an Egyptian academic and politician who serves as the current Minister of Higher Education and Scientific Research.
