= Hala Zayed =

Egyptian politician (born 1967)

- هالة زايد
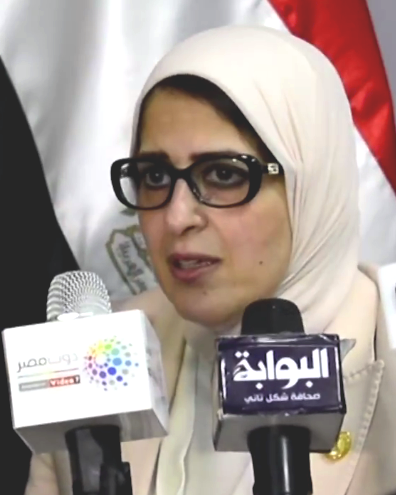

Ministry of Health and Population
- In office 14 June 2018 – 13 August 2022
- President: Abdel Fattah el-Sisi
- Prime Minister: Mostafa Madbouly
- Preceded by: Ahmed Emad El-Din Radi
- Succeeded by: Khaled Abdel Ghaffar

Personal details
- Born: 13 December 1967 (age 58)
- Education: Zagazig University, faculty of Medicine

Hala Mustafa Zayed (Arabic: هالة مصطفى زايد; born 13 December 1967) was the former Egyptian Minister of Health and Population in a cabinet headed by Mostafa Madbouly.
