= Beso (footballer) =

Egyptian footballer (born 1999)

Personal information
- Full name: Mohamed Ahmed
- Date of birth: 14 July 1999 (age 27)
- Position: Midfielder

Youth career
- Ittihad El Shorta
- 2010–2021: Al Ahly

Senior career*
| Years | Team | Apps | (Gls) |
| 2021–2022 | Al Ahly | 0 | (0) |
| 2021–2022 | → Viktoria Žižkov (loan) | 1 | (0) |
| 2022 | → Zemplín Michalovce (loan) | 0 | (0) |
| Total | | 1 | (0) |
- * Club domestic league appearances and goals

Mohamed Ahmed (Arabic: محمد أحمد; born 14 July 1999), known as Beso (Arabic: بيسو), is a former Egyptian professional footballer who played as a midfielder.

== Club career ==
Beso began his career with Ittihad El Shorta, before being scouted by Egyptian giants Al Ahly in 2010. Although negotiations initially stopped, Al Ahly came back with another offer, and Beso made the switch to the Cairo-based club.

After ten years in Cairo, Beso was loaned out to Czech National Football League side Viktoria Žižkov in 2021, alongside teammates Mido Hossam and Mostafa Fawzy. However, after only two appearances, Beso was recalled, and instead loaned to Slovak side Zemplín Michalovce. In completing this move, he became the first Egyptian to play for the club.

== Career statistics ==
=== Club ===
As of 2 May 2022.

| Club | Season | League | | | National Cup | | League Cup | | Continental | | Other | | Total | |
| Club | Season | Division | Apps | Goals | Apps | Goals | Apps | Goals | Apps | Goals | Apps | Goals | Apps | Goals |
|---|---|---|---|---|---|---|---|---|---|---|---|---|---|---|
| Al Ahly | 2021–22 | Egyptian Premier League | 0 | 0 | 0 | 0 | 0 | 0 | 0 | 0 | 0 | 0 | 0 | 0 |
| Viktoria Žižkov (loan) | 2021–22 | Fortuna národní liga | 1 | 0 | 1 (Note: Appearances in the Czech Cup) | 0 | – | | – | | 0 | 0 | 2 | 0 |
| Zemplín Michalovce (loan) | 2021–22 | Slovak Super Liga | 0 | 0 | 0 | 0 | – | | – | | 0 | 0 | 0 | 0 |
| Career total | | | 1 | 0 | 1 | 0 | 0 | 0 | 0 | 0 | 0 | 0 | 2 | 0 |
