= Alaa Fouad =

Egyptian lawyer, judge and minister of parliamentary affairs

Alaa El-Din Fouad (born 1965) is an Egyptian lawyer, judge and current minister of Parliamentary Affairs. He served as executive director of the National Elections Authority from 2017 until his appointment as minister.

== career ==
Fouad, a trained lawyer, began his legal career as a deputy to the public prosecutor and rose through the ranks to become head of public prosecution in Cairo. He was promoted to the position of a judge and appointed the head of Appeals Court serving concurrently as a member of the Judicial Inspection Unit in 2017. In same 2017, he was appointed executive director of the National Electoral Commission (NEC). He remained in this position until 13 August 2022 when he was appointed mister of Parliamentary Affairs. He succeeded Omar Marwan.
