= El Rahamnah =

El Rahamnah الرحامنة
- City
- Location in Egypt
- Coordinates: 31.296052°N 31.7484°E
- Country: Egypt
- Governorate: Damietta

Population
  - Total: 100,000
- Time zone: UTC+2 (EET)
  - Summer (DST): UTC+3 (EEST)

El Rahamnah (Arabic: الرحامنة) is a small city in Damietta Governorate, Egypt.

The ancient village Pihormes Tamoul (Coptic: ⲡⲓϩⲟⲣⲙⲉⲥ ⲧⲁⲙⲟⲩⲗ, Arabic: دمول, romanized: Damūl) was located in the vicinity of the city.
