= Kafr El Battikh =

Kafr El Battikh كفر البطيخ
- City
- Location in Egypt
- Coordinates: 31.32336°N 31.76122°E
- Country: Egypt
- Governorate: Damietta

Population (2018)
  - Total: 44,716
- Time zone: UTC+2 (EET)
  - Summer (DST): UTC+3 (EEST)

Kafr El Battikh (Arabic: كفر البطيخ) is a city in the Damietta Governorate, Egypt. Its population was estimated at 44,700 people in 2018.

== History ==
The older name of the town was Bura (Arabic: بوره), which comes from a Coptic name for grey mullet (Coptic: ⲫⲟⲣⲓ, romanized: phori).

The city was an important fishing town and got a new name when its production changed to watermelons in the Ottoman times. Yaqut mentions, aside from the fish, turbans as its other claim to fame. Bura was for a short time captured by the Crusaders in 1213.
