= Nevine El Kelany =

Egyptian academic and minister of culture

- نيفين الكيلاني
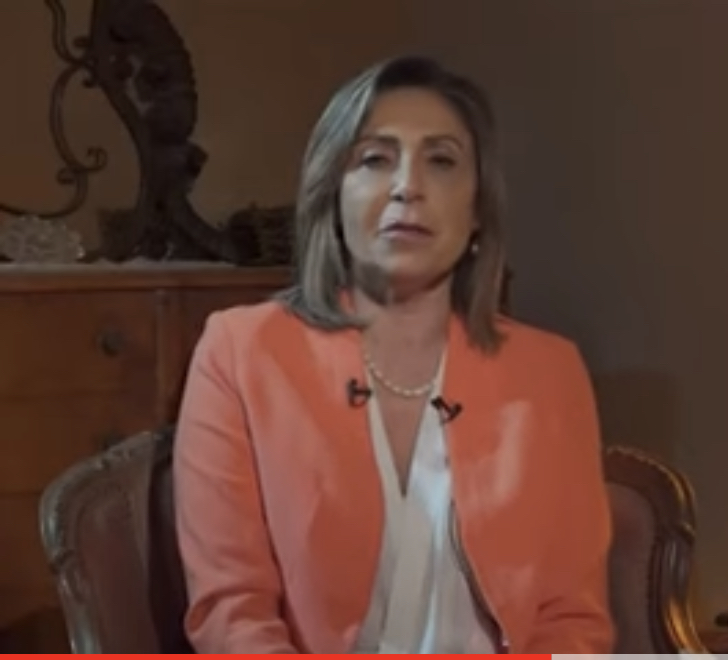
- Image of Nevine

Minister of Culture
- In office 13 August 2022 – 3 July 2024
- President: Abdel Fattah el-Sisi
- Prime Minister: Moustafa Madbouly
- Preceded by: Ines Abdel-Dayem
- Succeeded by: Ahmed Hanno

Personal details
- Born: June 26, 1964 (age 62) Cairo, Egypt
- Education: Higher Institute of Ballet (B.A., M.S., Ph.D.); Cairo University (Diploma)
- Occupation: Academic, politician
- Profession: University professor, art critic

Nevine Youssef El Kelany (Arabic: نيفين الكيلاني) (born 26 June 1964) is an Egyptian academic, art critic, and politician. She served as the Minister of Culture in the Cabinet of Egypt from August 2022 to July 2024. Prior to her ministerial appointment, she served as Dean of the Higher Institute of Art Criticism at the Academy of Arts in Cairo.

== Career ==
El Kelany earned her first degree in arts in 1989 and a PhD in Art Criticism in 1995 from same institution. She began her academic career as a teaching assistant at the Higher Institute of Ballet in 1989 and became an associate professor in same institution in 1997. From October 2000 to February 2007, she was an associate professor at The Kinetic Performing Arts Criticism at the Higher Institute of Artistic Criticism and became a full professor of same course and institution in 2012. El Kelany served twice as the dean of the Higher institute of Artistic Criticism at the Arts Academy from 2014 to 2015 and then from 2017 to 2022 when she was appointed minister of Culture in a cabinet reshuffle on 13 August 2022. She succeeded Ines Abdel-Dayem.
