= Kafr Saad =

Kafr Saad كفر سعد
- City
- Location in Egypt
- Coordinates: 31.359427°N 31.686452°E
- Country: Egypt
- Governorate: Damietta
- Time zone: UTC+2 (EET)
  - Summer (DST): UTC+3 (EEST)

Kafr Saad (Arabic: كفر سعد) is a city in Damietta Governorate, Egypt. It lies North East of the Nile Delta.

== See also ==
- List of cities and towns in Egypt
