= Ali al-Moselhi =

Egyptian politician (1949–2025)

Ali El-Sayed Ali Al-Moselhi
- علي السيد علي مصيلحي
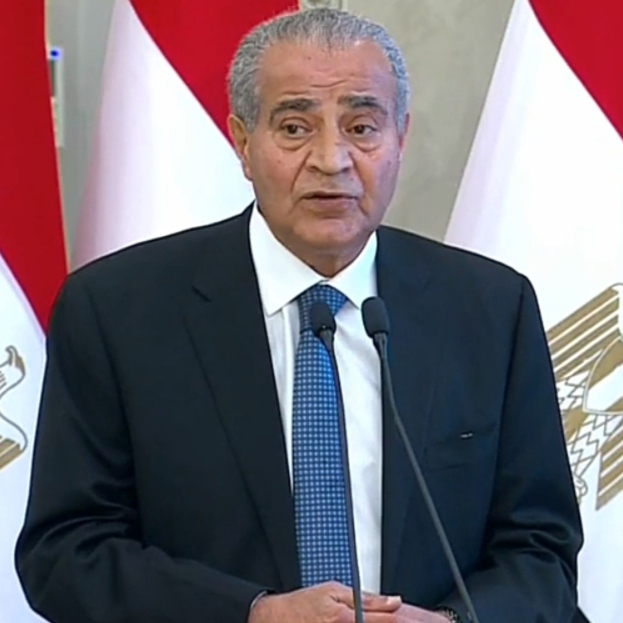

Minister of Supply and Internal Trade
- In office 16 February 2017 – 12 August 2025
- President: Abdel Fattah el-Sisi
- Prime Minister: Sherif Ismail; Mostafa Madbouly

Minister of Social Solidarity and Supply
- In office 31 December 2005 – 23 February 2011
- President: Hosni Mubarak
- Prime Minister: Ahmed Nazif; Ahmed Shafik

Personal details
- Born: 1949
- Died: 12 August 2025 (aged 76)

Ali El-Sayed Ali Al-Moselhi (1949 – 12 August 2025) was an Egyptian politician who was minister of Supply and Internal Trade in the cabinet of Mostafa Madbouly and a member of the Parliament, the People's Assembly, for the constituency Abu Kabeer, Ash Sharqiyah Governorate.

Al-Moselhi was the directing manager of "Standardata" (a software company based in Roxy, Heliopolis, Cairo).

Al-Moselhi died on 12 August 2025, at the age of 76 after a battle with brain tumor.
