= Muhammad Abdul Ati =

Egyptian Minister of Irrigation and Water Resources

- محمد عبد العاطي
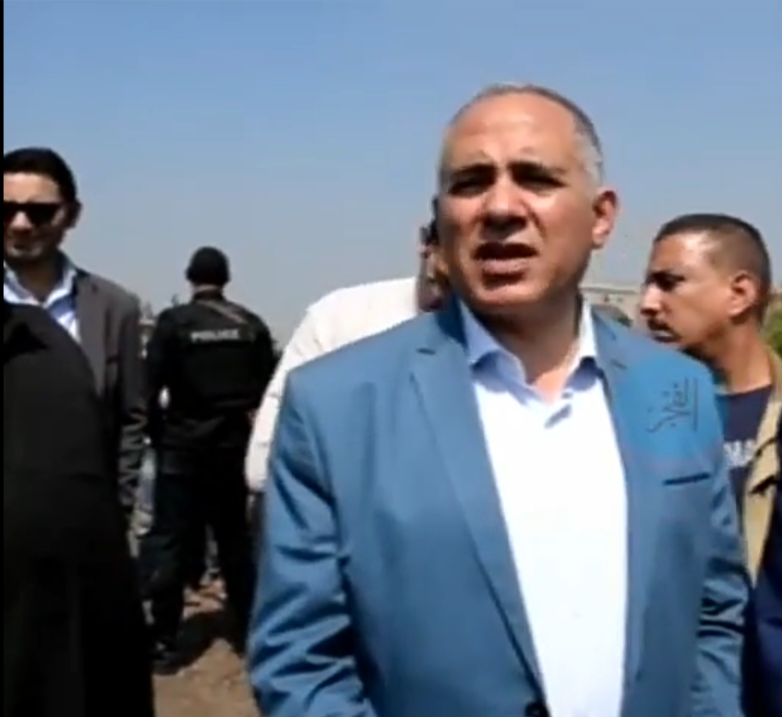

Egyptian Minister of Irrigation and Water Resources
- In office 23 March 2016 – 13 August 2022
- President: Abdel Fattah el-Sisi
- Prime Minister: Sherif Ismail, Mostafa Madbouly

Personal details
- Born: Muhammad Abdul Ati Sayyid Muhammad Khalil; 27 December 1963 (age 62) Egypt
- Education: Ain Shams University

Muhammad Abdul 'Ati (Arabic: محمد عبد العاطي; born 27 December 1963) is an Egyptian civil engineer, and a former Egyptian Minister of Irrigation and Water Resources.

== Early life and career ==
Muhammad Abdul Ati received his Bachelor of Engineering from Cairo University in 1986 and his PhD from Ain Shams University. He worked as head of the projects sector at the National Bank, lived for a time in Ethiopia, and participated in a study committee for the Renaissance Dam project.

== Awards ==
Abdul Ati won the Le prix Gaïa International Prize in Water Resources.
