= Salah Hasaballah =

Egyptian politician

- صلاح حسب الله
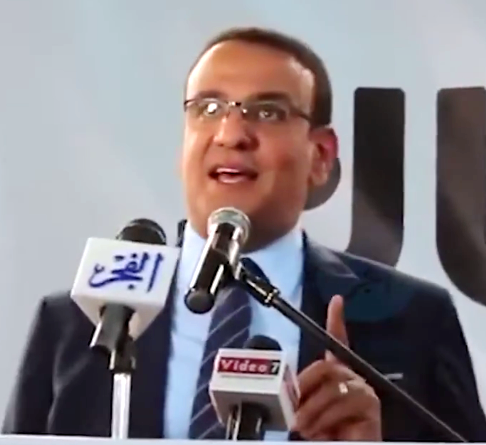
- Leader: Spokesperson for Egypt's House of Representatives

Personal details
- Born: Salah Mohammed Hasaballah Ahmed Qalyubiyya Governorate

Salah Hasaballah is an Egyptian government official and media spokesperson for Egypt's House of Representatives.

== Biography ==
Hasballah was a member of parliament for the National Democratic Party, which was the ruling party in Egypt.

He was a member of the Congress Party, though he announced in August 2015 that he resigned from the party and founded the Freedom Party.

Hasaballah is a member of the Egyptian Parliament, elected by the first district of Shubra El Kheima in Qalyubia Governorate. He was chosen as media spokesperson by Ali Abdel Aal, Speaker of the House of Representatives, to respond to criticisms of the House, control the representation of the House in media and cooperate with journalists and media professionals to convey accurate information about the House's activities.

Hasaballah was head of the Freedom Party until he announced that he was stepping down due to his preoccupation with the House of Representatives' upcoming elections. He was formerly the director of sports activity at Katameya Shooting Club.

Hasaballah is also the official spokesman for the Egyptian Support Coalition.

== Education ==
Salah obtained a PhD degree in Sports Administration from Helwan University and a Bachelor of Laws from Cairo University before obtaining a postgraduate diploma in international politics.

== Awards ==
Salah was selected as one of the 50 best MPs in the Egyptian Parliament.
