= Hisham Amna =

Egyptian military officer and politician

- Born: 10 December 1962 (age 63)
- Occupations: Army general, Politician

Major General Hisham Abdel Ghani Abdulaziz Amna (born 10 December 1962 in Menoufia Governorate) is an Egyptian army general and politician and current minister of Local Development. He was appointed in a cabinet reshuffle in August 2022 replacing major general Mahmoud Shaarawi.

== Career ==
Amna holds bachelor's degrees in military science and in Commerce. He held several positions in military operation commands including commander of the Republican Guard Police, Commander of Rocket Artillery battalion, and director of Republican Guard. He also served as head of the cities of Al-Qusayr and Safaga, and later governor of Beheira from 2018 until his appointment as minister of Local Development.

== Military medals ==
Long Service and Good idol Medal.

Medal of January 25.

Military Duty Medal of the first class
