= Ministry of Environment (Egypt) =

Government ministry of Egypt

Arab Republic of Egypt Ministry of Environment
- Emblem of Egypt

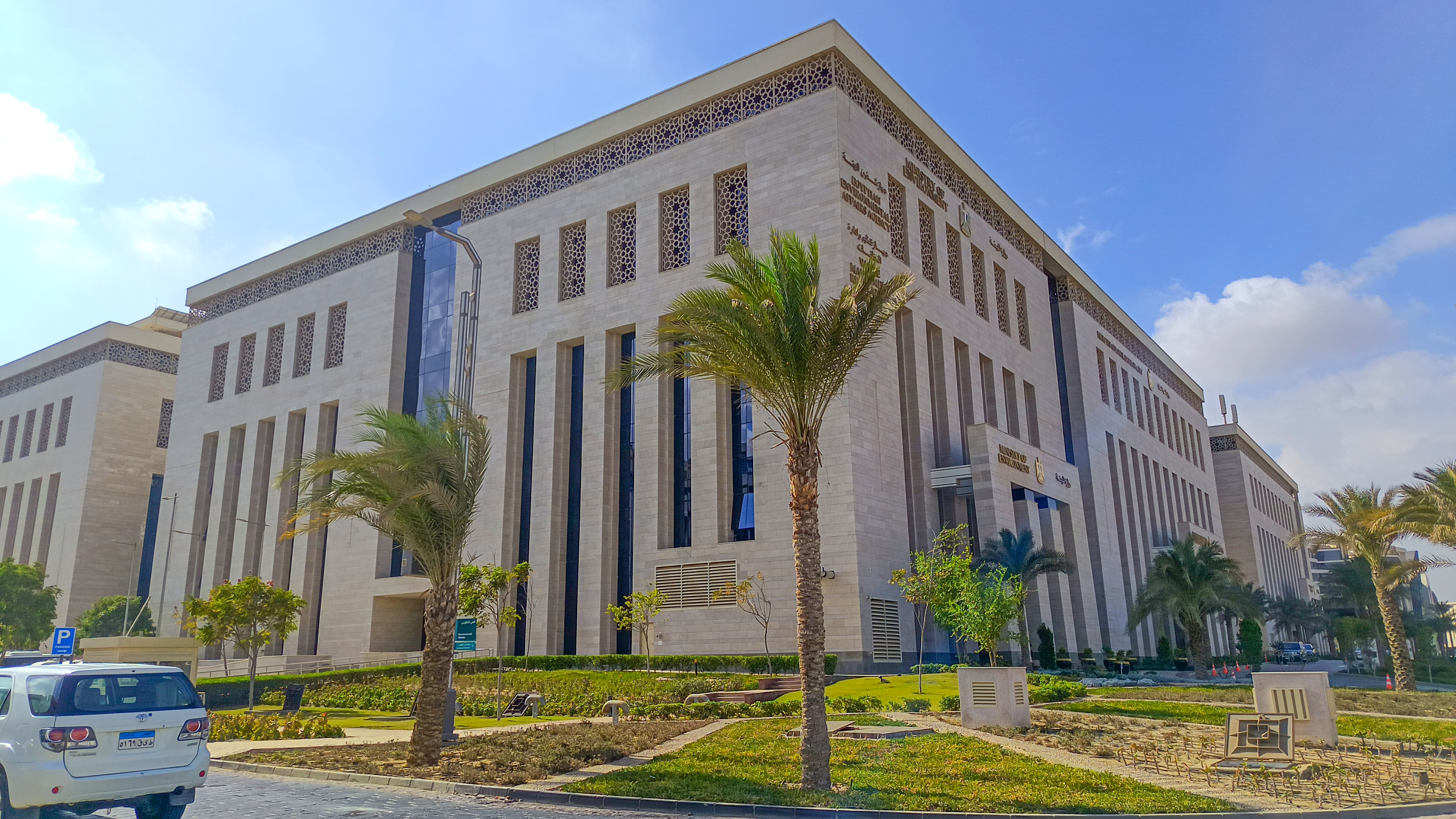
- The Ministry building in The New Capital

Agency overview
- Formed: 1997; 29 years ago
- Jurisdiction: Egypt
- Headquarters: The New Capital
- Agency executive: Manal Awad Mikhail, Minister
- Child agency: Egyptian Environmental Affairs Agency
- Website: www.eeaa.gov.eg

The Ministry of Environment is the ministry is responsible for environmental affairs in the Arab Republic of Egypt. As of 2015 the minister was Yasmine Fouad.

== History ==
It was established in 1997, and has since focused ministry in cooperation with all development partners to identify environmental vision and outline of environmental policies in Egypt. The policies of the ministry are executed by the Egyptian Environmental Affairs Agency.

== Projects ==
In 2014, the Ministry and Italy signed an agreement to make El Gouna, a Red Sea City, carbon neutral.

In 2017, the European Union and Egypt finalized plans for environmental and other projects valued at 600 million Euros.

In late 2017, the Ministry announced they had seen a reduction of 13-15% in the burning of rice by rice farmers, a practice that causes a black toxic cloud.

In 2021, the Ministry became a member of GWCN (Global Waste Cleaning Network).

== See also ==
- Cabinet of Egypt
