= Ashraf El-Shihy =

Egyptian politician, diplomat and civil engineer

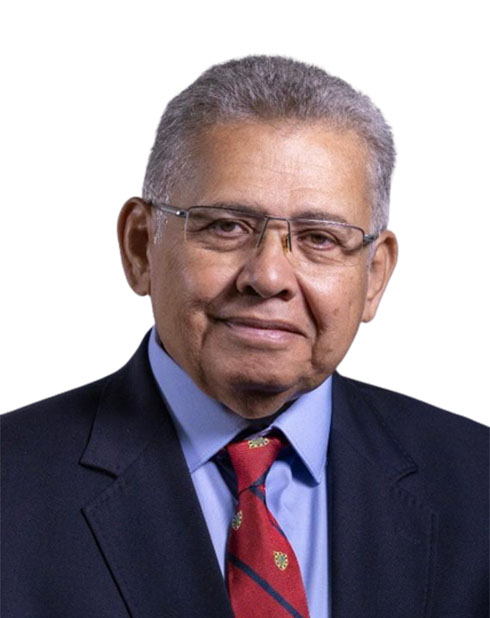

Minister of Higher Education and Minister of Scientific Research of Egypt
- In office 19 September 2015 – 19 February 2017
- President: Abdel Fattah el-Sisi
- Prime Minister: Sherif Ismail
- Preceded by: El-Sayed Ahmed Abdel Khaled (Minister of Higher Education). Sherif Aly Mohamed Hammad (Minister of Scientific Research)
- Succeeded by: Khaled Abd El Ghafar

Personal details
- Born: Ashraf Mohamed El-Shihy; 7 May 1955 (age 71) Cairo, Egypt
- Party: Independent
- Education: Cairo University (Alma mater) University of Southampton (Master of Science) University of Southampton (Doctorate)
- Website: www.egy-mhe.gov.eg

Ashraf Mohamed El Shihy (in Egyptian Arabic أشرف محمد عبد الحميد الشيحي), is an Egyptian politician, the Minister of Higher Education and Minister of Scientific Research, under President Abdel Fattah El-Sisi and the government of Sherif Ismail. He is currently the Chairman of the Education and Scientific Research Committee in the Egyptian House of Representatives as of January 2026.

== Early life, education, and career ==
Born in Cairo, Ashraf M. El Shihy graduated in 1977 from the Faculty of Engineering, Cairo University, receiving his Bachelor of Science in civil engineering. In 1980 he earned a master's degree in civil engineering from the University of Southampton, England, the United Kingdom. Then he got his doctorate degree in civil engineering also from the University of Southampton in 1986. He served in multiple prestigious positions in the higher education sector throughout Egypt. He rose in academic positions to the Dean of the Faculty of Engineering in May 2005, and Vice President for Graduate Studies and Research. In August to 2013, he served as Acting Chairman of the University of Zagazig and Vice President for Graduate Studies and Research. On 22 September 2014, President Abdel Fattah El-Sisi adopted a decision to assign El Shihy as the University President (Chancellor) of University of Zagazig, after all the professors at the university refused to stand in front of him in the elections of the presidency of the university. After removing the president of the university and the other two vice presidents as they belonged to the terrorist organization the "Muslim Brotherhood"; El Shihy is famous for working as a vice president for graduate studies and was in charge of the presidency of the university and the other vice presidents making him working the heaviest four jobs in the university alone for over a whole year; making the media and the press describe him as "the Four in One Man" or "4 in 1 Man". On 19 September 2015, Ahsraf El Shihy was assigned to the Ministry of Higher Education and Ministry of Scientific Research of Egypt. He is the former President of Egyptian Chinese University "ECU" 2017–2023, and the current President of Badr University in Cairo (BUC). Recognized for his deep academic expertise, Ashraf El Shihy is currently the Chairman of the Education and Scientific Research Committee in the Egyptian House of Representatives. providing his strategic oversight on national educational reforms as well as budget allocations.

== Minister of Higher Education and the Minister of Scientific Research ==
- 3 March 2015: The university team won the second place in the sports performances in the festival of unspecialized college students, where it was organized by the Ministry of Youth and Sports in Hurghada under the slogan "Sport brings us together in the love of Egypt,"
- 5 May 2015: In his reign at Zagazig University, he recommended the inclusion of an educational program to unite the graduate faculties of education programs at Egyptian universities, under the title "Special professional diplomas"
- The first of June 2015: intensive care unit emergency hospital opened the university as one of the steps to develop hospitals, Zagazig University, said at the time: "The project aims to create a hospital treatment research of stem cells is the first of its kind in the Middle East and the Red Sea level; to restore to Egypt its excellence and its leadership in the medical and therapeutic area and provide therapeutic and healthy outstanding service. "
- The same day, El Shihy said he is preparing a new Final Fantasy "Ahlia University"(in Egyptian Arabic: الجامعة الأهلية) of the branch of the university on 100 acres of the 380 acres owned by the university of 10th of Ramadan City, and began Statement hard and waiting for the Republican decision to start construction.
- 14 June 2015: El Shihy said that the University Council decided to terminate former President Dr. Mohamed Morsi service as a member of the faculty members of the faculty of Engineering at the university.
- 29 July 2015: announced the agreement in connection with its contract with the "COMESA" countries, to be a center for studies and research that supports the production and development in Africa, and you get the university under which $100 million over the next five years to achieve that purpose – it came during a celebration of the university excellence ninth day.

== Milestones as the Minister of Higher Education & the Minister of Scientific Research ==
- He took over the presidency of the Association for the Development of Education in Africa "ADEA", during his presidency of the 42 meeting in the capital of the Ivory Coast "Abidjan", and chaired the Technical Office of Education, Science and Technology of the African Union in Addis Ababa for two years, and the creation of stem cell research center and regenerative medicine and organ transplants.
- Minister of Higher Education that it decided to close the 46 institutes and placebo, and announced the establishment of the "University of Sphinx" in Asyut, "University of Motawaset" in Kafr El-Sheikh city, the "University of New Giza", "Egyptian Chinese University".
- Minister El Shihy chose conciliator Dr. Izz al-Din Abu State, as Secretary-General of the Council of Private and private universities.
- Among the most important achievements to its credit, the Minister of Higher Education and the Higher Education and Scientific Research, the budget has become in his 37 billion pounds rather than 27 billion pounds; and according to given the Egyptian government to the parliament, which in turn agreed to such an increase, according to the Constitution.
- Achieved some of the most prominent achievements of scientific research, headed by Dr. Mahmoud Sakr, President of the Academy of Scientific Research, currently four initiatives during 2016,
- Then he announced that 2016 is "the Year of Innovation", making March as "the Month of Sciences", and the declaration of a TV program titled "Cairo innovate," the initiative is the third to support graduation projects for students of Egyptian universities, where the number of submitted projects totaled 350 projects, with a total funding of about 3 million Egyptian pounds, and the initiative fourth is at the launch of innovators and inventors Egyptian universities League.
- He increased of number of students accepted to private universities set up in exchange for increased number of scholarships to students.
- Have implemented 11 projects during 2016 with a total funding of 8,000,945 thousand pounds, Hala'ib and Shalateen, including the application and development of an integrated farm in Hala'ib and Shalateen Model Project, an independent system for desalination wells 4,000-liter water on solar-powered, and the project design and manufacture of mobile small devices for the production of solar-powered ice to save the fish.
- Under Ashraf El Shihy, making student elections after being frozen for three years at the level of 23 universities, and the application of military education to students at private universities is also the Minister of Higher Education decided to stop printing agendas and notes allocated for offices and cultural centers and results; to rationalize spending on the allotted amount is used to support cultural activities offices.
- "El Shihy" declined the start of the study at the university of "New Giza" only after they cut their expenses, which would have exceeded the 120 thousand pounds per year for students, have also been developed mission system, according to the new standards, and based on that Saudi Arabia decided to send 2000 students to study in Egyptian universities during this year.
- The minister pointed out that the commission plan and budget the House of Representatives included an incentive to increase the quality of the faculty members at universities within the state budget.
- Among the most important achievements of the minister it has been in the custody of the approval of the opening of all colleges to students with special needs, and increase the income of missions abroad and doubled the national income of the arrivals, and change the rules committees promotions, in addition to the establishment of branches of universities of eligibility from the womb of public universities.
- He has restrengthened the relations between Azerbaijan and Egypt, a country which now has strong friendship developed in the fields of trade and culture.
- Egypts' representative member of UNESCO Executive Board Representatives of States Members to the Executive Board 2015–2019.
- Minister of Military Production Mohamed Al-Assar signed a cooperation protocol with the Minister of Higher Education Ashraf El Shihy.
- He opened the new UNESCO headquarters for the middle east on 14 February 2017 with the attendance of Irina Bokova the director general of UNESCO.

== Academic and practical career ==
- Heading the team that is responsible for laying out Egypt's strategic plans for sustainable development in the field of Higher Education & Scientific Research to the year 2030.
- Refereeing at the High committee of promoting professors in Structural & Construction Engineering for 20 years.
- Refereeing at the High Committee of promoting professors in Structural & Construction Engineering in some Arabic countries for 20 years.
- Supervision of a total number of 52 Ph.D. and M.Sc. Theses.
- Examination of over 100 Ph.D. and M.Sc. candidates in different Egyptian & Arabic universities.
- Over 150 published papers in a number of international journals & conferences in the field of (Composite Steel, Concrete structures, Finite Element Modeling of Structures, Soil-Structure Interaction, Repair and Strengthening of Structures, Bearing Walls and Reinforced Masonry Structures and Earthquake Analysis and Design).
- Four reference books (1-Structural Analysis 2-Structural Mechanics 3-Solved Problems in Structures 4-Computer Aided Structural Analysis and Design).
- He serves as the Head of the Education and Scientific Research Policies Committee in the Ministry of Higher Education & Scientific Research. He is also a member of the board of trustees for several higher education institutions in Egypt; a board member of the Egypt Academy of Scientific Research; a member of the committee responsible for recruiting and selecting the Egyptian Cultural and Educational Councilors/Attachés from Egypt who are assigned to serve in foreign countries; and a board member on the Holding Company for Investment & Development, Housing and Development Bank – Egypt.
- He has had extensive experience in developing international relations and is a much sought-after expert in the field of strategic planning for education and scientific research. To that end, he led two of the largest associations in the field of education and scientific research in Africa. In October 2015, he was elected in Addis Ababa to a 2-year term as Head of the Technical Bureau for Education, Science and Technology (STC) in Africa. He was also elected at Abidjan, Côte d'Ivoire in December 2015 to serve for two years as the Head of the Association for Developing Education in Africa (AFEA). During his tenure with STC and AFEA, his responsibilities included meeting on many occasions with the ministers of education representing all African nations.
- Structural Engineer in a number of international firms and design offices (American & British), in addition to, a number of Egyptian firms.
- Member of over ten scientific societies in the field of Structural Engineering.
- Over 40 years of experience in the field of Higher Education, Researches, Educational Planning, Strategy and Structural Engineering.
- Head of STC (The Scientific Bureau of Education, Science & Technology in Africa.
- Head of ADEA (Association for the development of education in Africa).
- In the International Conference of Traditional Chinese Medicine and Functional Medicine, the conference was attended by representatives of the ECU, China's Shanghai Jiao Tong University and the Chinese Embassy in Egypt, as well as Egyptian and Chinese professors. Ashraf ElShihy, and Bao Yong, dean of health management and service innovation center of Shanghai Jiao Tong University, signed an agreement to establish Egypt Hospital of Traditional Chinese Medicine. He stated that "the university deepens the Egypt-China cooperation and enhances learning from the Chinese experience in the fields of education and scientific research".

== Civil engineering career ==
Ashraf El Shihy has delivered delivered some critical infrastructure, masterplans, and public utility projects across different cities and governorates in Egypt in cooperation with premier international engineering construction and consultant firms.

- Ashraf has worked on the construction for the Headquarters for the Arab International Bank and the World Trade Center Complex in Cairo where he worked both in design and as site supervisor as a project engineer at Skidmore, Owings & Merrill (SOM) in the seventies. He coordinated the site analysis and construction alignment phases for the mixed-use towers masterplan on the Nile Corniche in Cairo. He also managed the relationship between international architectural concepts with the Egyptian engineering codes. Moreover, he supervised early-stage foundation works and subterranean site stabilization along the riverfront. This project has played a significant role in adding a premium commercial hub that transformed downtown Cairo's skyline and modernized its corporate vertical real estate.
- Ashraf El Shihy worked on the construction for Western New Nubaria Land Reclamation and Irrigation Project in the Western Nile Delta where he worked in design as a senior civil & water resources engineer in Halcrow–ULG Limited in the eighties. He managed the on-site engineering supervision, earthworks quality control, and structural layout for the state-led project for reclaiming the desert initiative "New Lands". He directed the installation of expansive water distribution networks. Moreover, he managed the construction of cross-desert canal networks, high-capacity pumping stations, as well as modern drip-irrigation systems. This project has transformed thousands of kilometers of arid lands into arable farmlands resulting in establishing sustainable infrastructure for tens of new agricultural villages.
- Furthermore, Ashraf El Shihy also worded on the construction of the Rod El Farag Water Treatment Plant Northern Cairo where he worked both in design and as site Utilities Specialist at Howard Humphreys & Partners (now operating under Jacobs) in the eighties. He provided civil engineering works, structure drawings, and site supervision for the major expansion of Greater Cairo's critical water utility grid. Also, he managed the civil engineering works for the establishment of modernized sedimentation tanks, advanced filtration bays, as well as high-capacity chlorination utilities. The project resulted in doubling the plant's daily clean water output which has secured a safe and reliable drinking water supply for millions of citizens of Greater Cairo.

== Current occupation ==
- He is the current President of Badr University in Cairo (BUC). He served in multiple prestigious positions in the higher education sector throughout Egypt to include as the former Ministry of Higher Education and Ministry of Scientific Research of Egypt., the former President of Egyptian Chinese University "ECU" 2017–2023, and the former President of Zagazig University. He serves as the Head of the Education and Scientific Research Policies Committee in the Ministry of Higher Education & Scientific Research. He is also a member of the board of trustees for several higher education institutions in Egypt; a board member of the Egypt Academy of Scientific Research; a member of the committee responsible for recruiting and selecting the Egyptian Cultural and Educational Councilors/Attachés from Egypt who are assigned to serve in foreign countries; and a board member on the Holding Company for Investment & Development, Housing and Development Bank – Egypt. He had extensive experience in developing international relations and is a much sought-after expert in the field of strategic planning for education and scientific research. To that end, El Shihy led two of the largest associations in the field of education and scientific research in Africa. In October 2015, he was elected in Addis Ababa to a 2-year term as Head of the Technical Bureau for Education, Science and Technology (STC) in Africa. He was also elected at Abidjan, Côte d'Ivoire in December 2015 to serve for 2 years as the Head of the Association for Developing Education in Africa (AFEA). During his tenure with STC and AFEA, his responsibilities included meeting on many occasions with the ministers of education representing all African nations. Recognized for his deep academic expertise, Ashraf El Shihy is currently the Chairman of the Education and Scientific Research Committee in the Egyptian House of Representatives. providing his strategic oversight on national educational reforms as well as budget allocations.
