= Ministry of Local Development =

Government ministry of Egypt

Arab Republic of Egypt Ministry of Local Development
- وزارة الدولة للتنمية المحلية
- Emblem of Egypt

Agency overview
- Jurisdiction: Government of Egypt
- Headquarters: Giza
- Agency executive: Mahmoud Youssry Shaarawy, Minister
- Website: http://mld.gov.eg

The Ministry of Local Development is the Egyptian government body responsible for local development. It is currently headed by Major General Hesham Amna.

The ministry was established by the decision of the President of Egypt with decree No. 325 of 1999. One of its objectives is to coordinate various efforts for the development of local communities and administration units in partnership with the governorates of Egypt.

== Initiatives ==
The ministry's goals are to decentralize power and to provide employment for youth and women especially.

Their projects include decreasing illiteracy in Egypt, improving public services, generating more civic engagement, preparing local leaders, and in unison with other ministries, providing the land for the building of new housing units.

In 2018, the ministry requested that restrictions on Tuk Tuk licensing be lifted in order to ease congestion in cities.

== See also ==
- Cabinet of Egypt
