= Mahmoud Esmat =

Egyptian politician

Mahmoud Mostafa Kamal Esmat
- محمود مصطفى كمال عصمت

Minister of Electricity and Renewable Energy
- Incumbent
- Assumed office July 2024

Minister of Public Business Sector
- Incumbent
- Assumed office 13 August 2022
- Preceded by: Hisham Tawfiq

Personal details
- Born: 1954 (age 71–72) Cairo Governorate, Egypt
- Education: B.Sc. in Electrical Engineering, Cairo University; Ph.D. in Electrical Power Engineering, Dalhousie University, Canada
- Occupation: Engineer; academic; government minister
- Known for: Leading Egypt’s electricity and renewable energy sector; overseeing development of public enterprises and infrastructure

Mahmoud Mostafa Kamal Esmat is an Egyptian politician and the current minister of Public Enterprise since August 2022.

== Career ==
Esmat holds a PhD in engineering from Daehaus University, Canada. He served as chairman of various agencies including Cairo Glass Manufacturing Company, Cairo Airport Company and chairman of the board of directors of Airports Holding Company. He was appointed on 13 August 2022 by President Abdel Fattah El-Sis and confirmed by the House of Representatives. Esmat appointment was with terms of reference to oversee the construction of El Nasr Automotive Manufacturing Company plant for production of electric cars in Egypt and completion of spinning and weaving companies. He took over from Hesham Tawfiq.
