= Ahmed Emad El-Din Radi =

Egyptian politician (1955–2023)

Minister of Health
- In office 19 September 2015 – 14 June 2018
- Preceded by: Adel Adawy
- Succeeded by: Hala Zayed

Personal details
- Born: 8 June 1955 Cairo, Egypt
- Died: 5 June 2023 (aged 67) Nasr City, Egypt
- Education: Ain Shams University Faculty of Medicine
- Occupation: Doctor

Ahmed Emad El-Din Radi (Arabic: أحمد عماد الدين راضي; 8 June 1955 – 5 June 2023) was an Egyptian doctor and politician. He served as Minister of Health from 2015 to 2018.

Radi died of complications from surgery in Nasr City on 5 June 2023, at the age of 67.
