= Hassan Mohamed Shehata =

Egyptian trade unionist and politician

Hassan Mohamed Shehata (born in 1964, in Cairo Governorate) is an Egyptian trade unionist, politician and a former minister of Manpower in the Egyptian cabinet. He was elected secretary-general of the Federation of the Egyptian Trade Union in 2022 for a term of four years.

== Career ==
Hassan Mohamed Shehata, born in 1964 in Cairo Governorate earned a bachelor's degree and Post Graduate Diploma in Marketing from Institute of Cooperative Studies. He served concurrently as a member of the board of directors of the EgyptAir holding company and Egyptian Academy of Aviation Sciences in 2013. He was elected vice president of the General Federation of Egyptian Trade Unions in 2013 and later elected to the presidency of General Union of Air Transport in 2018. In 2021, he assumed the position of President of the General Federation of Egyptian Trade Unions following the passing of the union's president Mohamed Wahballah. He was elected president of the union for a term of four years (2022–2026) in June 2022 after polling 245 votes to beat his opponent Adel Abdel-Fadil who scored 170 votes.

He was appointed minister of Manpower on 13 August 2022 in a cabinet reshuffle that saw the exit of Mohamed Saafan from the ministry. Following assumption of office, Shehata presented to the Egyptian cabinet a proposal and secured approval on 1 June 2023 for the change of the name of Ministry of Manpower to Ministry of Labour to widen the scope of the ministry's responsibilities to cover all labour related issues in line with the Labour Law 12 of 2013.
