= El Zarqa =

El Zarqa الزرقا
- City
- Location in Egypt
- Coordinates: 31.208177°N 31.635046°E
- Country: Egypt
- Governorate: Damietta

Population
  - Total: 30 000
- Time zone: UTC+2 (EET)
  - Summer (DST): UTC+3 (EEST)

El Zarqa (Arabic: الزرقا, lit. 'the blue one') is a city in Damietta Governorate, Egypt. Its population in 2005 was 17,741.

== See also ==
- List of cities and towns in Egypt
