= El Beso =

El Beso may refer to:

- El Beso (sculpture), a sculpture in the Miraflores district of Lima, Peru
- El Beso (Mon Laferte song)
- El Beso (Pablo Alborán song)
