= Cabinet of Egypt =

Chief executive body of the Republic of Egypt

- Coat of arms of Egypt
- Formation: August 28, 1878 (148 years ago)
- Location: Government District, The New Capital, Egypt
- Prime Minister of Egypt: Mostafa Madbouly
- Membership: 20+ members
- Website: www.cabinet.gov.eg

The Cabinet of Egypt (Egyptian Arabic: مجلس وزراء مصر) is the chief executive body of the Arab Republic of Egypt. It consists of the prime minister and the cabinet ministers. The government has a leading role in shaping the agenda of the houses of Parliament. It may propose laws to Parliament, as well as amendments during parliamentary meetings. It may make use of some procedures to speed up parliamentary deliberations. The government is responsible only to Parliament, specifically the House of Representatives of Egypt.

The House of Representatives may pass a motion of censure, forcing the resignation of the cabinet. Ministers have to answer questions from Members of Parliament, both written and oral; this is known as Inquiries to the Government Requests for information (Talebat Alihata).

In addition, ministers attend meetings of the two houses of Parliament when laws pertaining to their areas of responsibility are being discussed.

The details of the cabinet's organisation are set down in articles 153 to 160 of the constitution. Article 155 states that the members of the cabinet have to be sworn in when taking office.

== 21st century ==
The interim cabinet of Essam Sharaf was sworn in on Monday 7 March 2011 by Field Marshal Hussein Tantawi, head of the Supreme Council of the Armed Forces & Minister of Defense. In July 2011, Sharaf fired several ministers although the Supreme Council of the Armed Forces said he did not have that power. On 21 November 2011, the entire Cabinet offered to resign in the face of the second wave of protests. On 24 November 2011, Egypt's military rulers appointed former prime minister Kamal Ganzouri to form a new government. His government resigned on 26 June 2012 after the election of Mohamed Morsi as president of Egypt to make way for the new government.

On 7 June 2018, the Minister of Housing and Urban Utilities Mostafa Madbouly was appointed to succeed previous prime minister Sherif Ismail. It was also reported the new government had dropped eight cabinet ministers, including Minister of Antiquities Khaled Al-Anany, Minister of Manpower Mohamed Saafan, Minister of Irrigation Mohamed Abdel Aty, Minister of Health Ahmed Emaddin, Minister of Agriculture Abdel Moniem al-Banna, and Minister of Higher Education Khaled Abdel Ghaffar. The proposed Cabinet has been accepted by the Egyptian Parliament. The final list of candidates for ministerial posts in the Madbouly government was published on 10 June 2018, and includes Assem El-Gazar as minister of housing; Hala Zayed as minister of health; Yasmeen Fouad as minister of environment; Mohamed Eissa as minister of manpower; Amr Nassar as minister of trade and industry; Magdy Abo El-Ela as minister of justice, Hala El-Khatib or Ashraf Sobhy as minister of youth and sports; Mahmoud Shaarawy as minister of state for local development; and Mohamed Moiet as new minister of finance. Eight women will serve as ministers of investment, planning, health, environment, social solidarity, immigration, tourism, and culture and the following ministers of Ismail's cabinet will remain in their positions: the ministers of petroleum, transportation, education, higher education, foreign affairs, interior, defence, military production, tourism, and parliamentary affairs

On 13 June, it was reported that Madbouly had selected 13 to 16 deputy ministers and that the new government would be sworn in on 14 June. On 14 June, a new government consisting of 12 new ministers and 15 new deputy ministers was sworn in by Sisi. Madbouly was also sworn in as Prime Minister and will retain his role as Housing Minister as well. It was reported that his government would issue its policy statement on 23 June. but parliamentary spokesman Salah Hassaballah later confirmed this to be incorrect. On 23 June, Hassaballah stated that while no date was now scheduled to present the policy statement before Parliament, he expected the Madbouly government to present it in the next week and that the government was unable to prepare it in time for the planned date. Madbouly delivered his policy statement before the parliament on 3 July. The House of Representatives, the only legislative body in Egypt's unicameral parliament, afterwards referred the matter to a special committee chaired by first deputy speaker Al-Sayed Al-Sherif, which completed its review of the statement recommended a vote of confidence. Following weeks of debate, the House approved Madbouly's Cabinet in a vote of confidence on 25 July.

== List of cabinets ==
=== President Anwar Sadat (1970 — 1981) ===
1. First Mahmoud Fawzi Cabinet (October 1970 — November 1970)
2. Second Mahmoud Fawzi Cabinet (November 1970 — May 1971)
3. Third Mahmoud Fawzi Cabinet (May 1971 — January 1972)
4. Aziz Sidqi Cabinet (January 1972 — April 1974)
5. First Anwar Sadat Cabinet (April 1974 — September 1974)
6. Abdel Aziz Mohamed Higazi Cabinet (September 1974 — 1975)
7. First Mamdouh.Salem Cabinet (1975 — March 1976)
8. Second Mamdouh Salem Cabinet (March 1976 — November 1976)
9. Third Mamdouh Salem Cabinet (November 1976 - February 1977)
10. Forth Mamdouh Salem Cabinet (February 1977 — October 1977)
11. Fifth Mamdouh Salem Cabinet (October 1977 — May 1978)
12. Sixth Mamdouh Salem Cabinet (May 1978 — October 1978)
13. First Mostafa Khalil Cabinet (October 1978 — June 1979)
14. Second Mostafa Khalil Cabinet (June 1979 — May 1980)
15. Second Sadat Cabinet (May 1980 — October 1981), first limited reshuffle, second limited reshuffle.

=== President Hosni Mubarak (1981— 2011) ===
1. Hosni Mubarak Cabinet (October 1981 - 1982)
2. Fuad Mohiedin Cabinet (1982 — 1984)
3. Kamal Hassan Ali Cabinet (1984 — 1985)
4. Ali Lutfi Cabinet (1985 — 1986)
5. Atef Sedki Cabinet (Three cabinets, 1986 – 1996)
6. First Ganzouri Cabinet (1996 – 1999)
7. Atef Ebeid Cabinet (1999 — 2004)
8. Ahmed Nazif Cabinet (2004 — 2011)
9. Ahmed Shafik Cabinet (January 2011 — March 2011)

=== Supreme Council of the Armed Forces (2011 — 2012) ===
1. Essam Sharaf Cabinet (2011 — 2011)
2. Second Ganzouri Cabinet (2011 — 2012)

=== President Mohamed Morsi (2012 — 2013) ===
1. Hisham Qandil Cabinet (2012 — 2013)

=== Interim president Adly Mansour (2013 — 2014) ===
1. Hazem al-Beblawi Cabinet (2013 — 2014
2. First Mahleb Cabinet (2014 — 2014)

=== President Abdel Fattah Al-Sisi (2014 — ) ===
1. Second Mahleb Cabinet (2014 — 2015)
2. Third Mahlab Cabinet (2015 — 2015)
3. Sherif Ismail Cabinet (2015 — 2018)
4. First Madbouly Cabinet (2018 — 2024)
5. Second Madbouly Cabinet (2024 — )

== See also ==
- Politics of Egypt
