= Soha Gendi =

Egyptian diplomat and politician

Soha Samir Nashed Gendi
- سهى سمير ناشد جندي
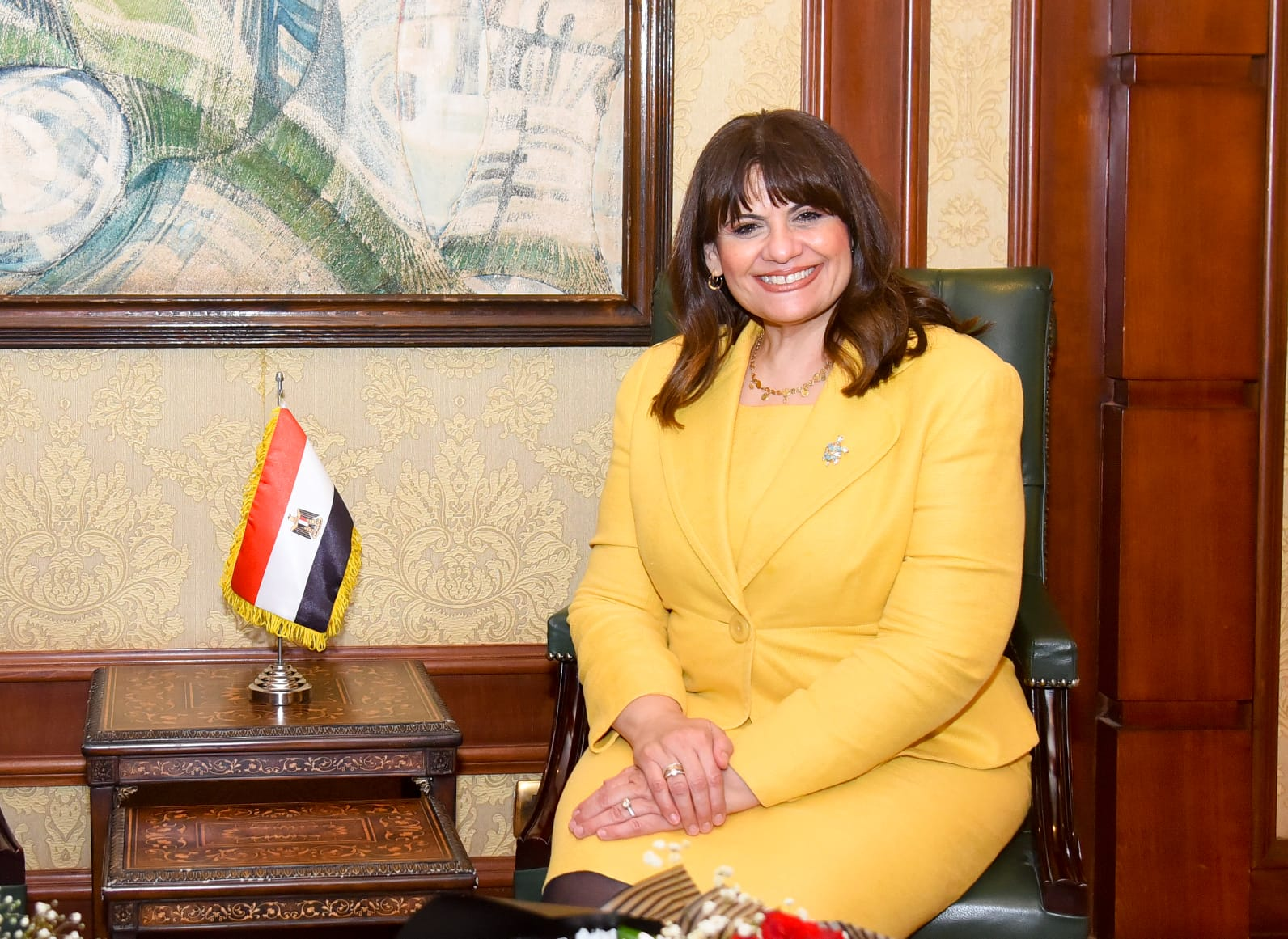

Minister of State for Emigration and Expatriate Affairs (Egypt)
- Incumbent
- Assumed office 13 August 2022

Personal details
- Education: B.A., English Language, Ain Shams University (1988); M.A., Euro-Mediterranean (Mediterranean) Studies, Cairo University (2010); Diploma, International Relations, German Development Institute (1990)
- Occupation: Diplomat, politician
- Known for: Egyptian diplomacy; leading ministry for emigrants and expatriates

Soha Samir Nashed Gendi is an Egyptian diplomat and politician. She is the current minister of Emigration and Expatriate Affairs. She was appointed on 13 August 2022 in a cabinet reshuffle.

== Career ==
Gendi was Egypt's deputy head of the permanent diplomatic mission to the United Nations in New York from 2006 to 2010 when she was appointed Egyptian ambassador to Ireland and served in this position until 2019. She was appointed assistant foreign minister and director of the African communities and organisations and remained in this position until her appoint her appointment as minister of Emigration and Egyptian Expatriate affairs in a cabinet reshuffle on 13 August 2023.
