= Mido Hossam =

Egyptian footballer (born 2000)

Personal information
- Full name: Mohamed Hossam El Nagar
- Date of birth: 12 January 2000 (age 26)
- Height: 1.87 m (6 ft 2 in)
- Position: Defender

Team information
- Current team: FK Viktoria Žižkov

Youth career
- Port Fouad
- 2011–2021: Al Ahly

Senior career*
Years	Team	Apps	(Gls)
2021– 2024	Al Ahly	0	(0)
2021	→ FK Viktoria Žižkov (loan)	5	(0)
2022	→ Teplice B (loan)	10	(0)
2022–2023	→ El Dakhleya (loan)	0	(0)
2024	FK Viktoria Žižkov	0	(0)
- * Club domestic league appearances and goals as of 17 April 2024

Mohamed Hossam El Nagar (Arabic: محمد حسام النجار; born 12 January 2000), known as Mido Hossam, is an Egyptian professional footballer who plays as a defender for FK Viktoria Žižkov

== Club career ==
Hossam started his career with local side Port Fouad, before joining Egyptian giants Al Ahly in 2011. He was named on the bench once for Al Ahly, in an Egyptian Premier League game against ENPPI, but did not feature. After ten years in Cairo, Hossam was loaned out to Czech side Viktoria Žižkov in August 2021.

After three months, in which he played five games in the Czech National Football League, and two in the Czech Cup, Hossam was recalled by Al Ahly, and sent on loan again, this time to Czech First League side Teplice.

== Career statistics ==
=== Club ===
As of 9 June 2022.

Club	Season	League			National Cup		League Cup		Continental		Other		Total	
Club	Season	Division	Apps	Goals	Apps	Goals	Apps	Goals	Apps	Goals	Apps	Goals	Apps	Goals
Al Ahly	2021–22	Egyptian Premier League	0	0	0	0	0	0	0	0	0	0	0	0
Al Ahly	Total		0	0	0	0	0	0	0	0	0	0	0	0
Viktoria Žižkov (loan)	2021–22	Fortuna národní liga	5	0	2 (Note: Appearances in the Czech Cup)	0	–		–		0	0	7	0
Viktoria Žižkov (loan)	Total		5	0	2	0	0	0	0	0	0	0	7	0
Teplice B (loan)	2021–22	ČFL	10	0	–		–		–		0	0	10	0
Teplice B (loan)	Total		10	0	–		–		–		0	0	10	0
El Dakhleya (loan)	2022–23	Egyptian Premier League	0	0	0	0	0	0	–				0	0
El Dakhleya (loan)	Total		0	0	0	0	0	0	–				0	0
Career total			15	0	2	0	0	0	0	0	0	0	17	0
