= Khaled Abdel Ghaffar =

Egyptian politician (born 1962)

- خالد عبد الغفار
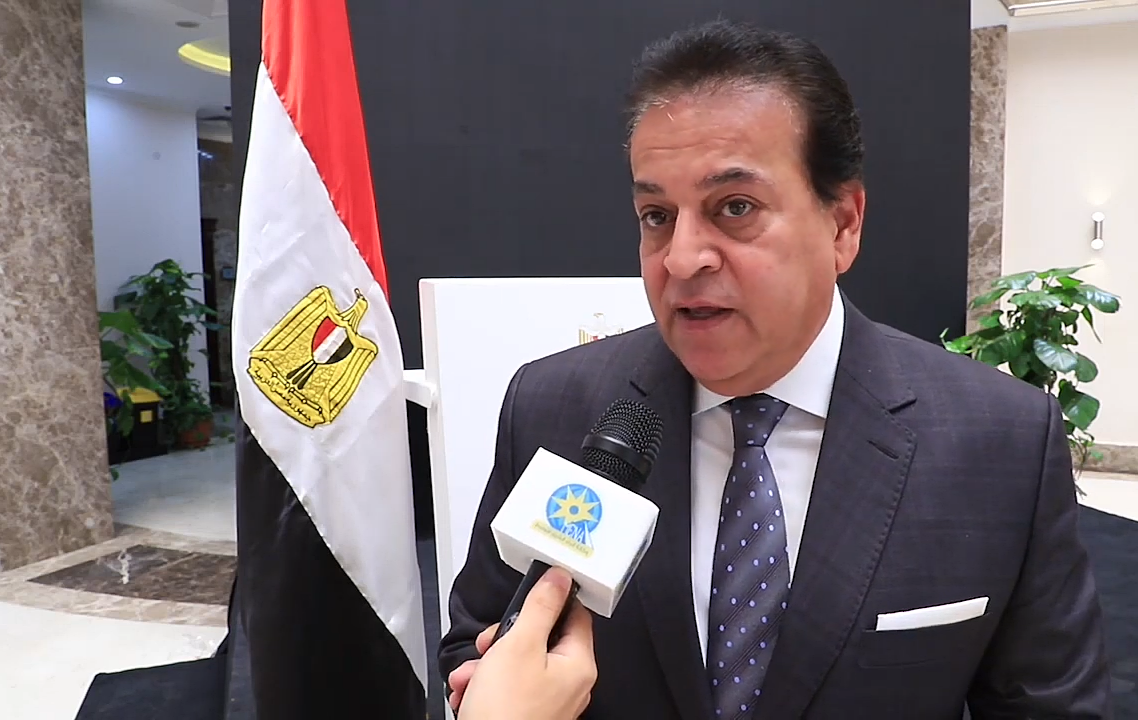

Ministry of Health and Population
- Incumbent
- Assumed office 30 October 2021; Acting: 30 October 2021 – 14 August 2022
- President: Abdel Fattah el-Sisi
- Prime Minister: Mostafa Madbouly
- Preceded by: Hala Zayed

Minister of Higher Education and Scientific Research
- In office 16 February 2017 – 13 August 2022
- President: Abdel Fattah el-Sisi
- Prime Minister: Sherif Ismail; Mostafa Madbouly
- Preceded by: Ashraf El-Shihy
- Succeeded by: Mohamed Ayman Ashour

Personal details
- Born: 24 November 1962 (age 63)
- Education: Cairo University

Khalid Atef Abdul Ghaffar (Arabic: خالد عاطف عبد الغفار; born 24 November 1962) is the former Minister of Higher Education and Scientific Research, and the current Minister of Health and Population in Egypt. He was appointed Acting Minister of Health and Population in October 2021.

== Career ==
He headed the Department of Oral Medicine, Periodontology, Diagnosis and Radiology at the Faculty of Dentistry, Ain Shams University, from 2009 to November 2015. He was appointed Dean of Dentistry in Ain Shams in 2014, contributing to the introduction of state-of-the-art dental equipment. He was appointed Vice President for Graduate Studies and Research and was awarded the State Encouragement Prize in Medical Sciences and published 20 research papers in international journals and magazines.
