= Ministry of Health and Population (Egypt) =

Government ministry of Egypt

Coordinates: 30°2′21″N 31°14′14″E

Arab Republic of Egypt Ministry of Health and Population
- وزارة الصحة والسكان

Agency overview
- Formed: 1936
- Jurisdiction: Government of Egypt
- Headquarters: Cairo
- Agency executive: Khaled Abdel Ghaffar, Minister
- Website: www.mohp.gov.eg

The Ministry of Health and Population (MoHP) has its headquarters in Cairo. Khaled Abdel Ghaffar, the current Health Minister, was appointed in October 2021.

== Ministers ==
- Muhammad Awad Tag al-Din (3 November 2002 - 31 December 2005)
- Hatem al-Jabali (31 December 2005 – 31 January 2011)
- Ahmed Sameh Farid (31 January 2011 – 22 February 2011)
- Ashraf Hatem (22 February 2011 – 21 July 2011)
- Amr Helmy (21 July 2011 – 7 December 2011)
- Fouad El-Nawawy (7 December 2011 – 30 June 2012)
- Mohamed Mostafa Hamed (2 August 2012 – 8 July 2013)
- Maha El-Rebbat (16 July 2013 – 1 March 2014)
- Adel Adawy (1 March 2014 – 19 September 2015)
- Ahmed Emad El-Din Radi (19 September 2015 – 14 June 2018)
- Hala Zayed (14 June 2018 – 30 October 2021)
- Khaled Abdel Ghaffar (30 October 2021 (Acting to 14 August 2022) – Present)

== See also ==
- Cabinet of Egypt
