= Ashraf Sobhy =

Egyptian Minister of Youth and Sports

- أشرف صبحي
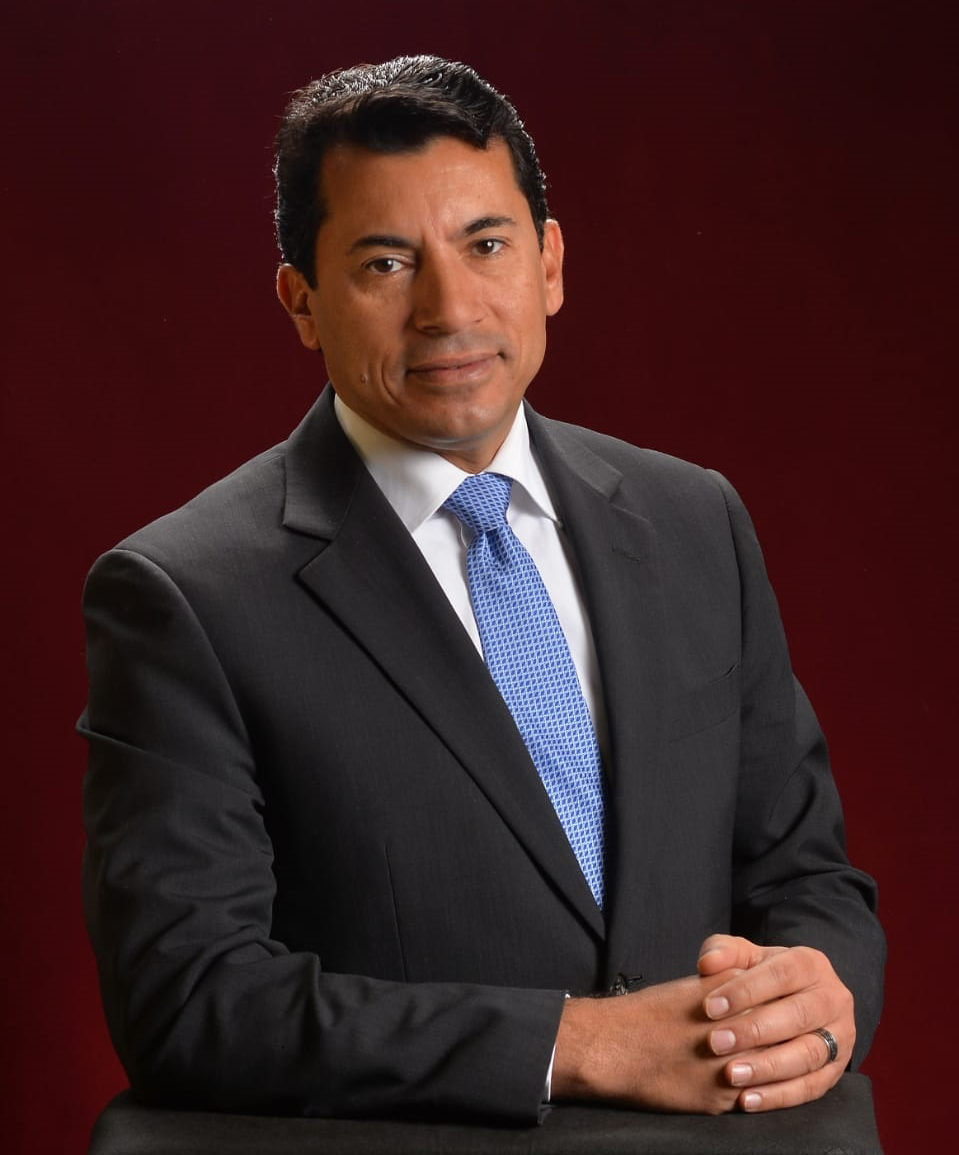

Egyptian Minister of Youth and Sports
- Incumbent
- Assumed office 14 July 2018
- President: Abdel Fattah el-Sisi
- Prime Minister: Mostafa Madbouly

Personal details
- Born: Ashraf Sobhy Muhammad Hussain Aamir; 14 April 1968 (age 58) Sharqia Governorate, Egypt
- Education: Helwan University, Iowa University

Ashraf Sobhy (Arabic: أشرف صبحي; born 14 April 1968) is the current Egyptian Minister of Youth and Sports, and a professor of Sports Department at Helwan University.

Ashraf Sobhi was assigned to work as an assistant to the Minister of Youth and Sports in the government of Ibrahim Mahlab since August 2014 until March 2016, but he submitted his resignation without reasons. On 14 June 2018, Sobhi was appointed Minister of Youth and Sports in the government of Mostafa Madbouly.

== Education ==
Sobhi holds the following degrees:

- Bachelor of Physical Education from the Faculty of Physical Education at Helwan University.
- Master in Sports Public Relations from Helwan University. - 1994
- Ph.D. in Sports Administration from Helwan University and Iowa University as well- 2000.

== Sport career ==
Sobhy played Karate and won the Karate Republic Championship.
