= Ministry of Higher Education and Scientific Research (Egypt) =

Government ministry of Egypt

- Emblem of Egypt

Agency overview
- Formed: 9 November 1961; 65 years ago
- Jurisdiction: Government of Egypt
- Headquarters: Cairo
- Agency executive: Abdul Aziz Qansouh, Minister
- Website: mohesr.gov.eg

The Ministry of Higher Education and Scientific Research is one of the governmental ministries of Egypt and part of the cabinet. It was formed in 1961.

== History ==
The ministry was established on 9 November 1961, when university education in Egypt became free.

The ministry employed seven different ministers between March 2011 and June 2013. Amr Ezzat Salama was one of the ministers during this period.

Mostafa Mussad served as minister of higher education from August 2012 to July 2013 when Hossam Eisa replaced him in the post. The ministry was headed by El Sayed Abdel Khalek between June 2014 and September 2015. He was replaced by Ashraf El-Shihy in the post. In February 2017, Khaled Abdel Ghaffar was appointed to head the ministry.

== Organization and activities ==
The major function of the ministry, based in Cairo is to introduce, develop and monitor all the higher education-related policies. The ministry is responsible for the educational activity in Egyptian universities, both public and private. The ministry realizes this function through three executive bodies, namely the Supreme Council of Universities, the Supreme Council of Private Universities and the Supreme Council of Technical Institutions.

In addition, the ministry supervises the Academy of the Arabic Language and the National Committee of UNESCO. The ministry has international bureaus, including the Egyptian Cultural and Educational Bureau in Washington, D.C.

In early 2018, the ministry with Minya University, spearheaded a week-long sports event for people with disabilities. It was the first of its kind in Egypt's history, as Egypt works to include the disabled in social activities.

In 2018 it was announced that starting from Kindergarten, Egyptian children would be learning English.
