= Tarek El-Molla =

Egyptian engineer and politician

Tarek El Molla
- طارق الملا
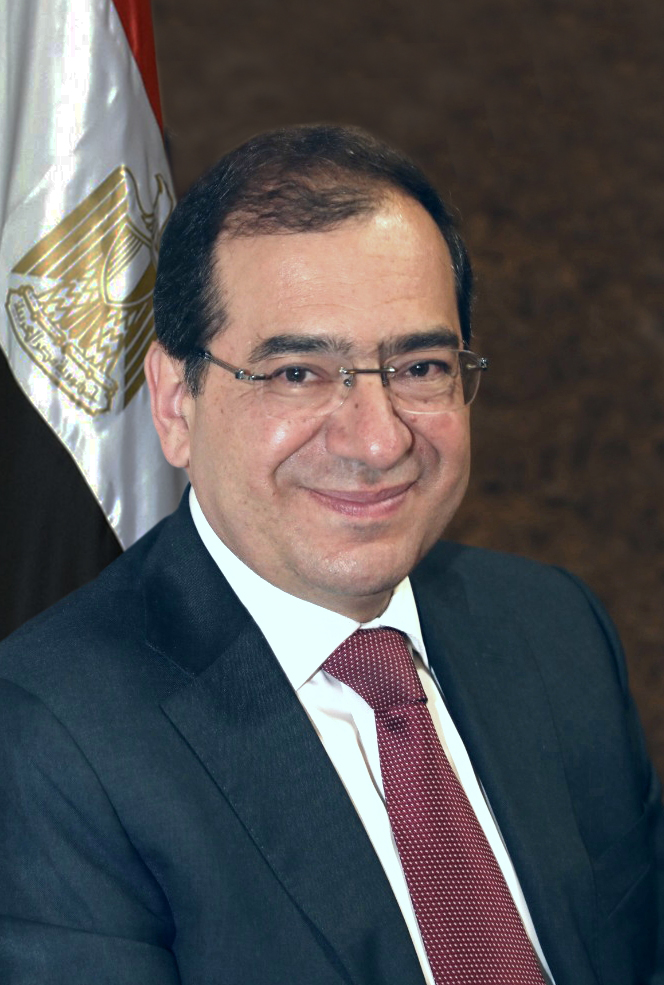
- Tarek El Molla, 2021

Minister of Petroleum
- Incumbent
- Assumed office 19 September 2015
- President: Abdel Fattah el-Sisi
- Prime Minister: Moustafa Madbouly
- Preceded by: Sherif Ismail

Personal details
- Born: June 1962 (age 64)
- Education: Cairo University
- Occupation: Engineer, Minister of Petroleum and Mineral Resources (Egypt)

Tarek El-Molla (Arabic: طارق الملا) (born June 1962) is an Egyptian engineer and a former Minister of Petroleum & Mineral Resources.

== Career ==
El-Molla graduated with a Bachelor of Mechanical Engineering from Cairo University in 1986. He worked for international oil company Chevron Corporation in 1987–2010. In 2011 he joined Egyptian General Petroleum Corporation, which he headed from August 2013 to September 2015.

On 19 September 2015, he was sworn in as the Minister of Petroleum & Mineral Resources, and he remained in his post until 3 June 2024.

== C.V. ==
- Received his B.Sc. in Mechanical Engineering from the Cairo University in 1986.
- Joined Chevron (Egypt) in Jan. 1987.
- Worked in different fields and held various positions in Engineering, Operations, Planning, Sales and Marketing.
- In 1998, he became Sales Manager and Member of the Board of Directors of Chevron Egypt S.A.E.
- During the period from 2002 until 2008, he got several Chevron assignments and managed projects in Dubai, Kenya & Singapore.
- In 2008, he became Managing Director–Marketing of Chevron Egypt.
- From 2008 until the end of 2010, he moved to Chevron South Africa, held the position of Regional Manager in charge of South & Central Africa's Commercial & Industrial Business.
- In Jan. 2011, he joined EGPC as the Deputy CEO for Foreign Trade. During this period of time (2011–2013), he was also assigned as Deputy CEO for both Internal Trade & Operations.
- He was appointed as EGPC's CEO in Aug. 2013.
- On 19 September 2015, he was appointed as Minister of Petroleum and Mineral Resources.
- On 14 June 2018, Eng. Tarek El Molla has sworn in as Minister of Petroleum and Mineral Resources, in the new Government of the Prime Minister, Dr. Mostafa Madbouly.

== Accolades ==
On 10 May 2017, the French President awarded him the Legion of Honor Medal with the rank of Knight, in recognition of his efforts in advancing Egyptian-French relations in the oil and gas industry.

On 10 November 2020, the President of the Hellenic Republic awarded him the "Grand Commander of the Order of Phoenix".

Political offices
Preceded by Sherif Ismail	Minister of Petroleum of Egypt; 2015–present	Incumbent
