= Omar Marwan =

Egyptian minister of justice

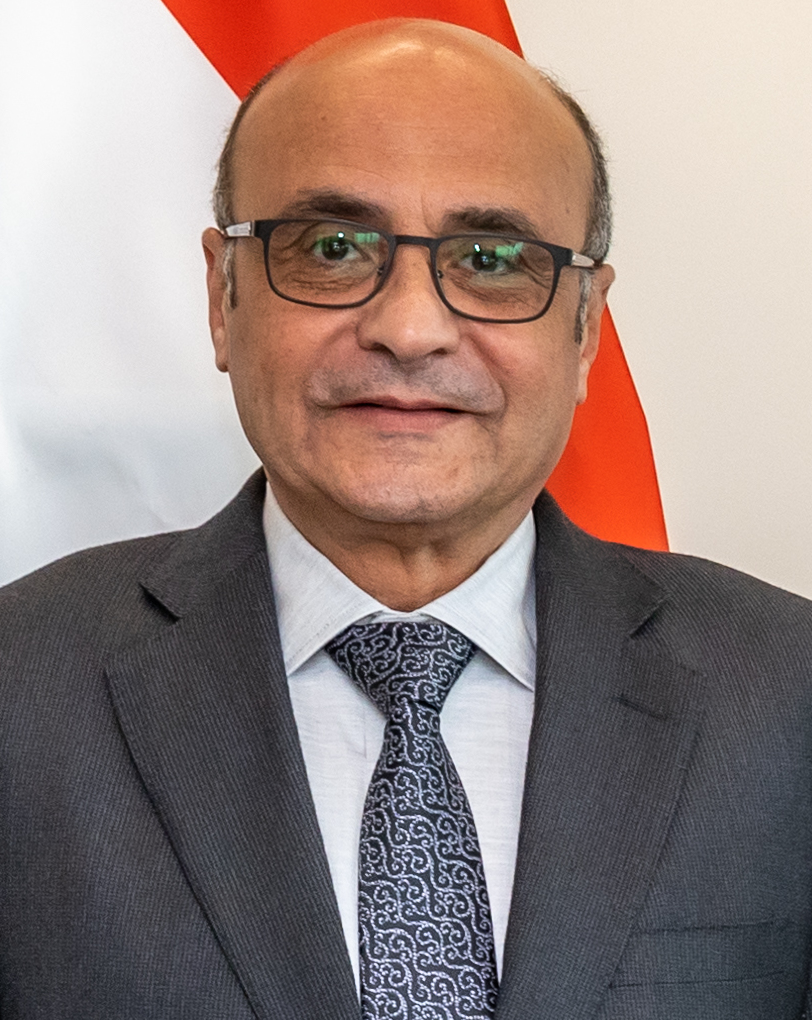
Image of Omar Marwan

Omar Marwan is an Egyptian judge currently serving as Director of the Egyptian presidential office. Previously, he served as Minister of Justice. He also served as minister of Legal and Parliamentary Affairs before being redeployed to the Ministry of Justice in a cabinet reshuffle in 2022.

== Education and career ==
Omar Marwan earned his first degree in law from Ain Shams University in 1979. He trained in humanitarian law, justice administration, electoral system and human rights. During his judicial practice, he served in the office of Prosecutor General and at the Court of Appeal. He chaired fact-finding committee of the Supreme council of the Armed Forces that investigated human rights abuses during the January 2011 revolution that ousted President Hosni Mubarak. He also chaired the fact-finding committee that investigated the overthrow of the Muslim Brotherhood government led by President Mohamed Morsi on 30 June 2013. He served as the secretary-general and spokesman of the High Elections Committee (HEC) in 2015 and was appointed assistant Justice Minister for forensic affairs in 2016. In 2017, he was appointed a substantive minister of Legal and Parliamentary Affairs. He was redeployed to the Justice ministry on 12 December 2019 in a cabinet reshuffle replacing Hossam Abdel-Rahim.
