= Damietta Governorate =

Governorate of Egypt

Damietta Governorate محافظة دمياط
- Governorate
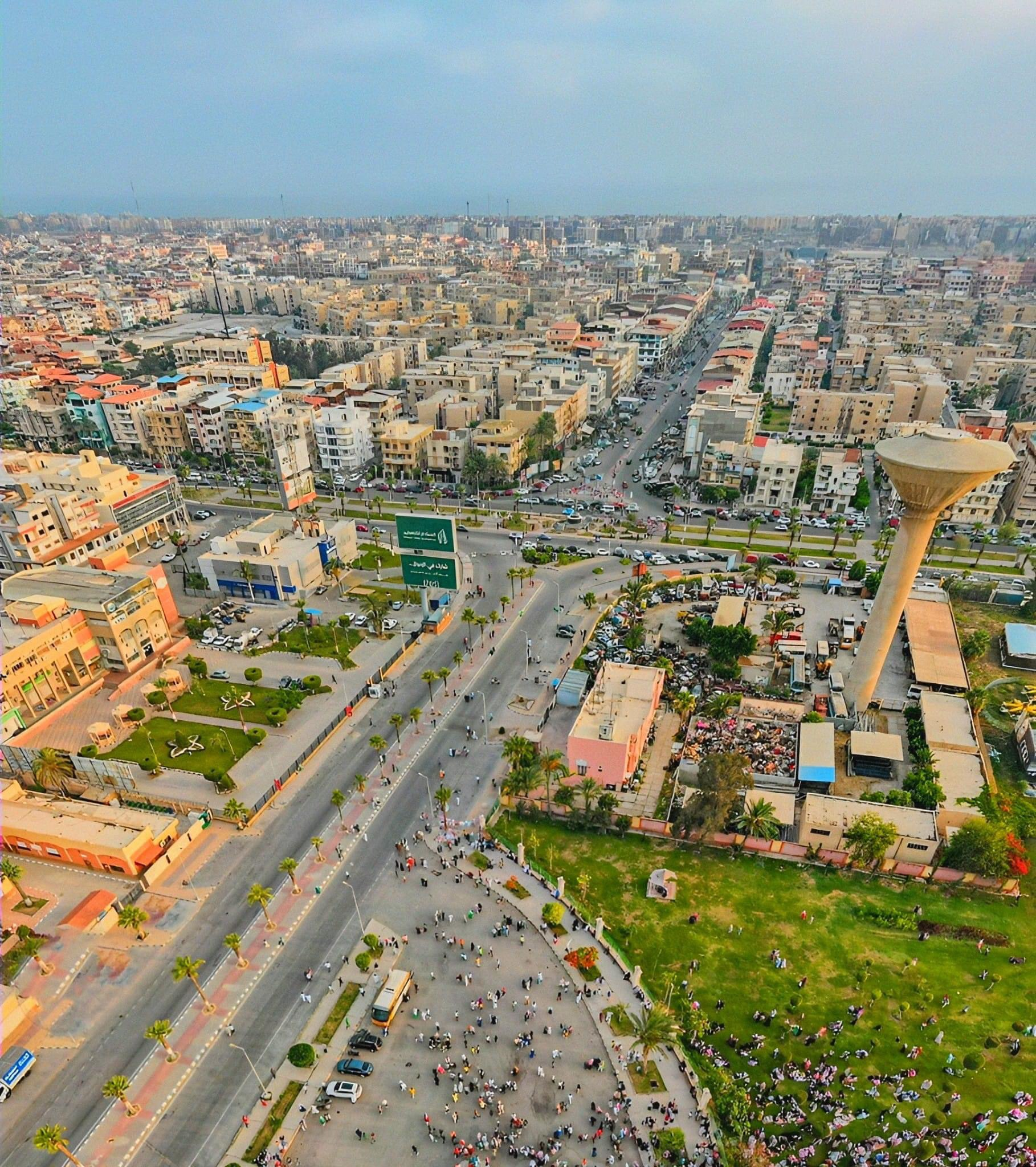

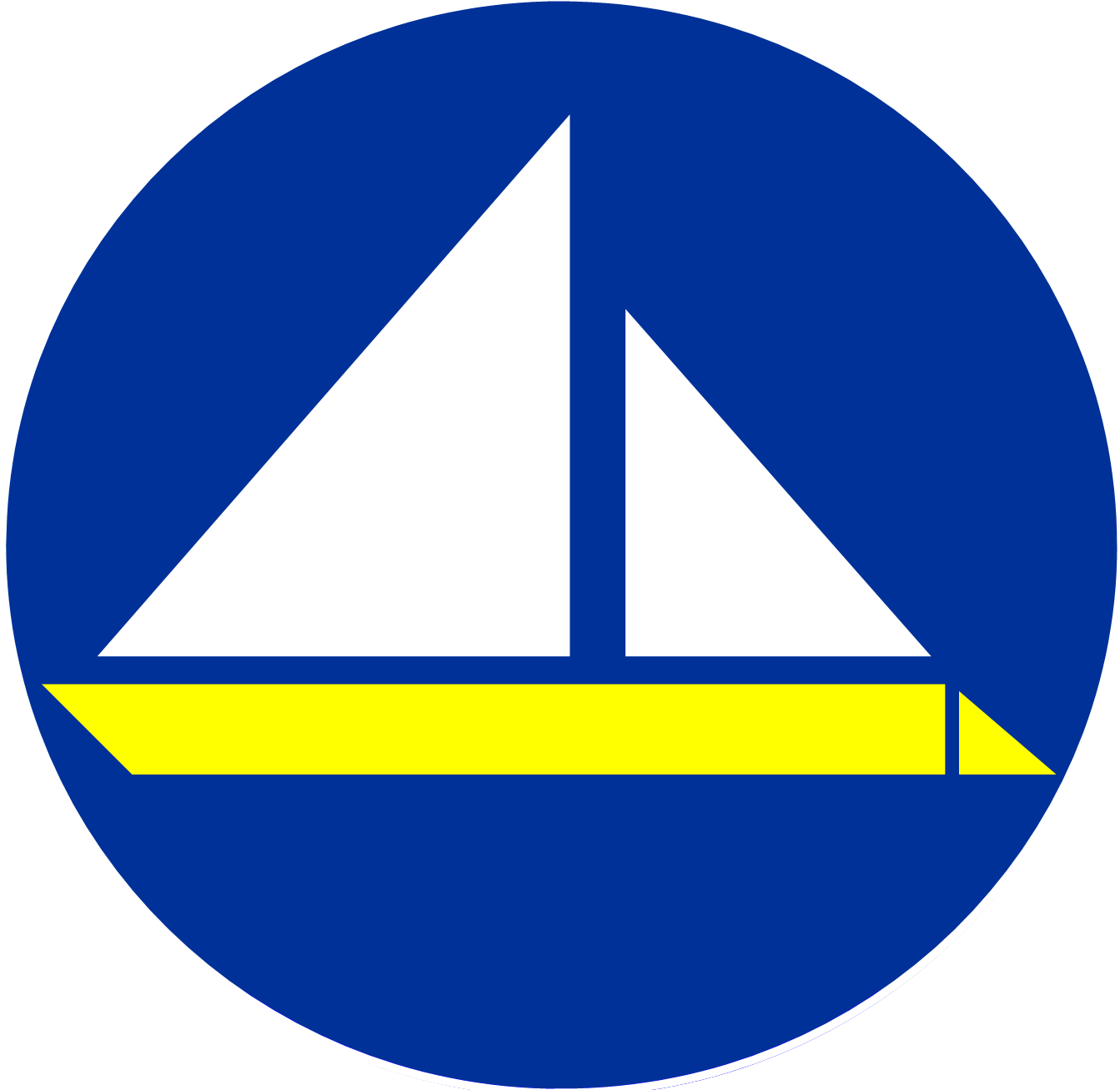
- Flag

- Damietta Governorate on the map of Egypt
- Coordinates: 31.4°N 31.72°E
- Country: Egypt
- Seat: Damietta (capital)

Government
  - Governor: Ayman el-Shahaby

Area
  - Total: 1,029 km^{2} (397 sq mi)

Population (January 2023)
  - Total: 1,610,586
  - Density: 1,565/km^{2} (4,054/sq mi)

GDP
  - Total: EGP 110 billion (US$ 7.0 billion)
- Time zone: UTC+2 (EGY)
  - Summer (DST): UTC+3 (EEST)
- HDI (2021): 0.757 high · 5th
- Website: www.domyat.gov.eg

Damietta (Arabic: محافظة دمياط, romanized: Muḥāfazat Dumyāṭ, Egyptian Arabic pronunciation: [moˈħɑfzˤet domˈjɑːtˤ]) is one of the 27 governorates of Egypt. It is located in the northeastern part of the country, and has a population of over 1.3 million. The capital is the city of Damietta.

Damietta (city) is famous for its guava farms, as well as the palm trees that cover the coast from Ras El Bar in the east to Gamasa in the west. The governorate exports millions of palm trees to many countries every year, including Greece and China. Damietta also produces wheat, maize, cotton, rice, potatoes, lemons, grapes and tomatoes. It is also famous for its sweet industry, sardine packing, furniture industry and Domiati cheese. Ras El Bar, one of the oldest summer resorts in Egypt, is located at the point where the Nile river meets the Mediterranean Sea.

In August 2018, Manal Awad Mikhail was the first Coptic woman to be appointed as a governor in Egypt.

On 3 July 2024, the new governor of Damietta was Ayman el-Shahaby.

== Overview ==
An important feature of this governorate is the Damietta Port which has been able to accommodate the movement of ships when bad weather forbids nearby ports to do so.

== Municipal divisions ==
The governorate is divided into the following municipal divisions for administrative purposes, with an estimated population of 1,610,586 as of January 2023.

Municipal Divisions
Anglicized name	Native name	Arabic transliteration	Population (January 2023 Est.)	Type
Al Sarw	قسم السرو	As-Sarw	29,782	Kism (fully urban)
El Zarqa	مركز الزرقا	Az-Zarqā	151,020	Markaz
Damietta	مركز دمياط	Dumyāṭ	354,716	Markaz
Damietta 1	قسم أول دمياط	Dumyāṭ 1	120,752	Kism (fully urban)
Damietta 2	قسم ثان دمياط	Dumyāṭ 2	190,357	Kism (fully urban)
Faraskur	مركز فارسكور	Fāraskūr	273,979	Markaz
Police Dept. Port of Damietta	إداره شرطه ميناء دمياط الجديد	Idārah Shurṭah Mīnā' Dumyāṭ al-Jadīd		Police-administrated Area
Kafr El Battikh	مركز كفر البطيخ	Kafr al-Baṭṭīkh	142,627	Markaz
Kafr Saad	مركز كفر سعد	Kafr Sa'd	281,533	Markaz
New Damietta	قسم مدينه دمياط الجديده	Madīnat Dumyāṭ al-Jadīdah	55,434	Kism (fully urban)
Ras El Bar	قسم رأس البر	Ra's al-Bar	10,386	Kism (fully urban)

== Population ==
According to population estimates, in 2015 the majority of residents in the governorate lived in rural areas, with an urbanization rate of only 38.7%. Out of an estimated 1,330,843 people residing in the governorate, 815,244 people lived in rural areas as opposed to only 515,599 in urban areas.

== Industrial zones ==
According to the Governing Authority for Investment and Free Zones (GAFI) the governorate is home to two industrial zones.

Zone name	Space (feddans)
New Damietta	558
General Free Zone in Damietta	190

== Demographics ==
The governorate's area is 1.029 km^{2} or about 5% of the Delta's area, and about 1% of the area of Egypt. The inhabited area is about 589.2 km^{2}. Its population – according to a 1999 census – was 953,430. The average rate of population growth is 2.09% per year.

== Administrative divisions ==
The governorate consists of 4 subdivisions, 10 cities, 35 local village units, 59 villages and 722 sub-villages. The subdivisions are Damietta, Faraskur, El Zarqa and Kafr Saad. The governorate includes 7 colleges and institutes, 19 professional training centers, and 657 pre-college schools.

== See also ==
- Battle of Mansurah (1250)
- Battle of Fariskur (1250)
- Damietta
- Damietta Port
- El Rahamnah
- Ras El Bar
- Siege of Damietta (1218)
- Siege of Damietta (1249)
- Ezbet El Borg
- El Zarqa
