= Environmental issues in Egypt =

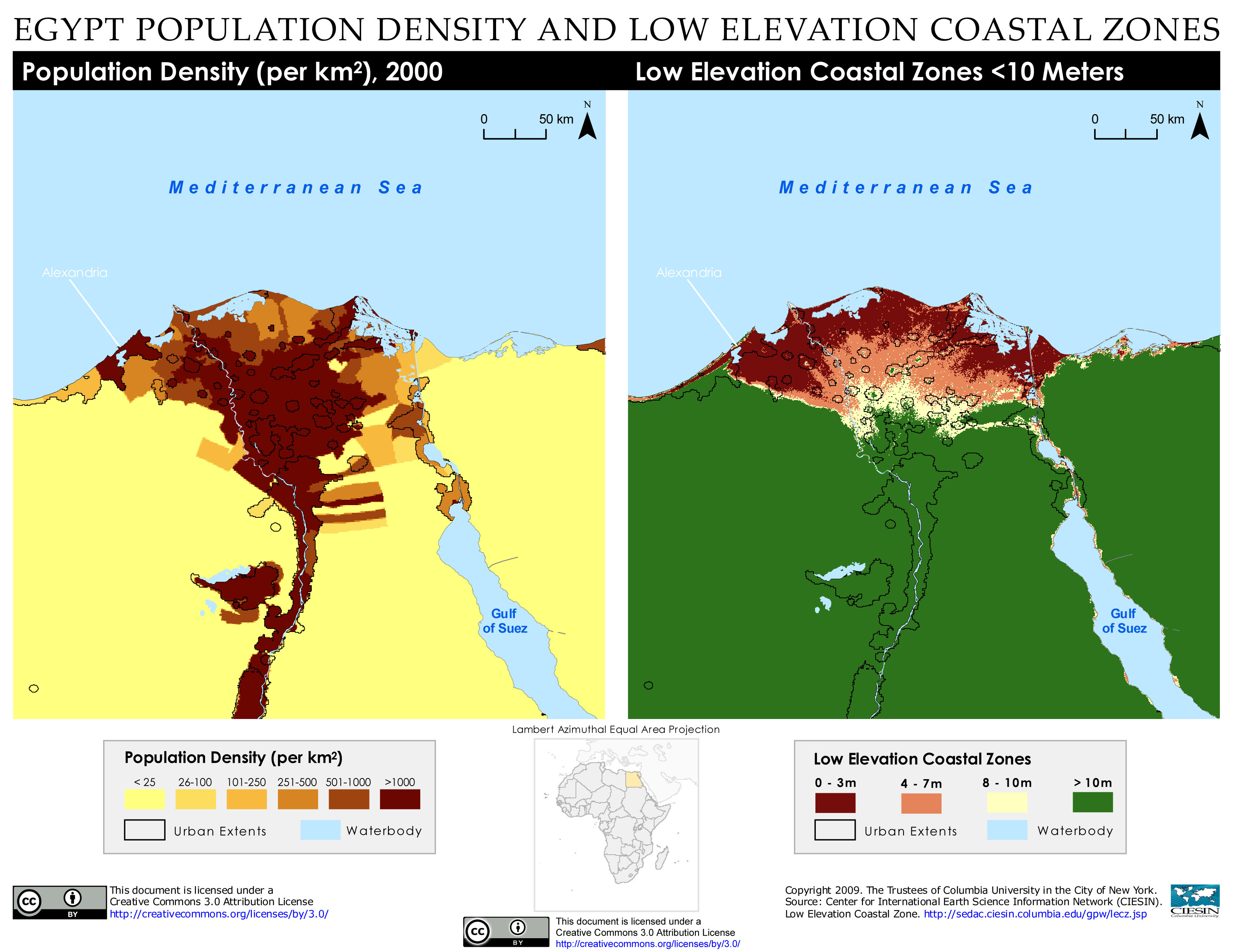
Egypt population density and low elevation coastal zones.

Egypt faces several environmental challenges, such as water and air pollution, water scarcity, soil degradation, and the effects of climate change. These problems are influenced by urban expansion, population growth, and the country's dependence on the Nile River as its primary source of freshwater. Rising sea levels and temperatures also pose additional risks to agricultural activities, particularly in the Nile delta. In response, The Egyptian Ministry of State for Environmental Affairs has been created to promote and protect Egypt's natural resources, focusing in improving waste management, conserving water resources, promoting sustainable development, and reducing air pollution.

== Natural resources ==
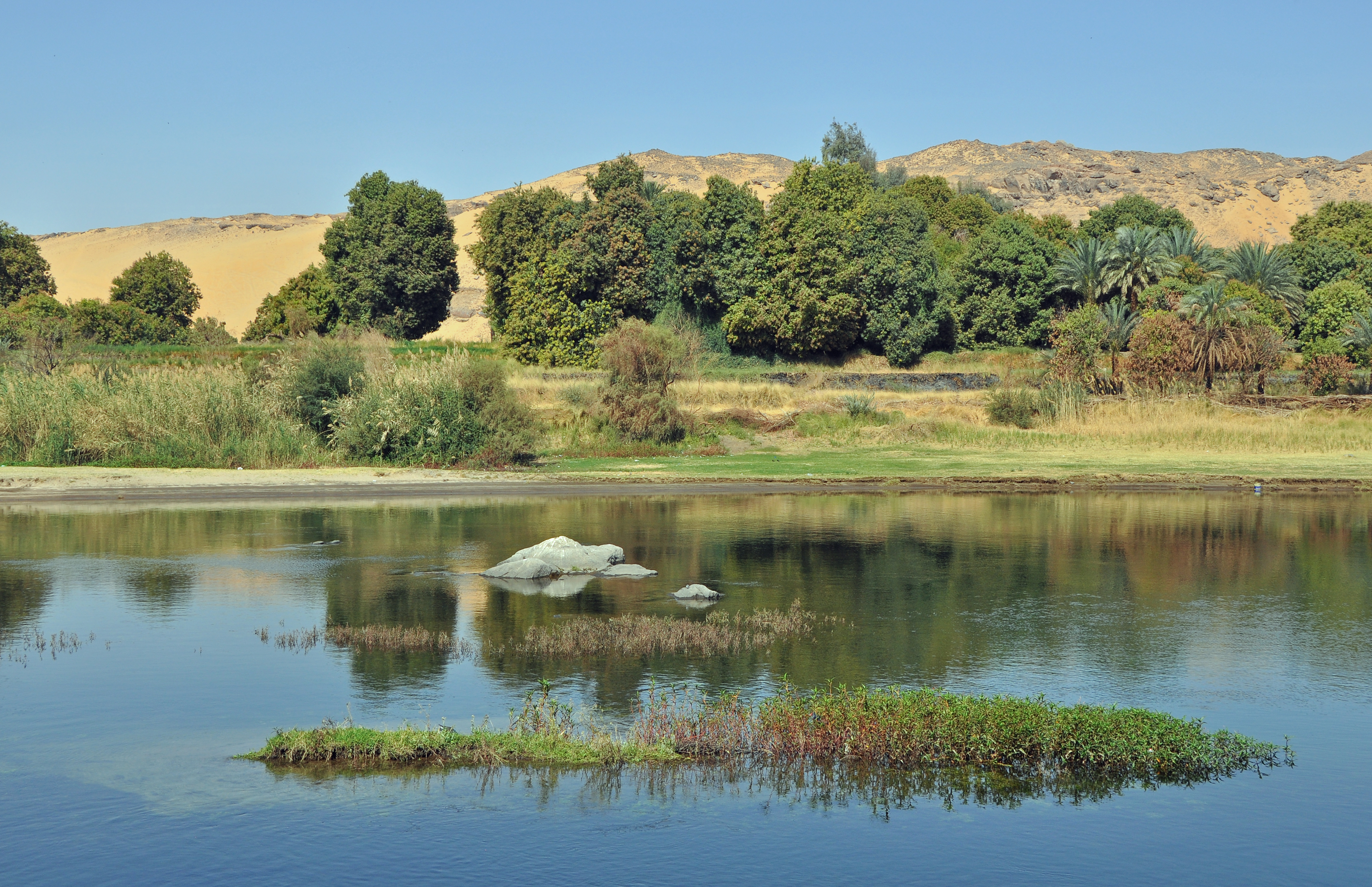
The Nile River in Aswan.

The Nile River provides Egyptians with natural resources that allow for agricultural lands and irrigation systems, making the management of the Nile important for economic growth in Egypt.

=== Land and agricultural resources ===
Egypt has an expanding population and limited resources, decreasing the amount of land available for farming. As a result, there has been intense social protest in Egypt and increased demand for access to resources such as agricultural land. Egypt depends on land for fruit cultivation found across the Nile, which has sustained Egypt's agriculture for more than 5,000 years.

The opening of natural resources and technological advancements throughout development projects in Egypt has historically created a range of feedback from Egyptians. Among these agricultural projects was the construction of villages created to provide for irrigation strategies from Lower Egypt and Upper Egypt, done as a means of strengthening Egypt's economy at the height of its capitalist endeavors during the British occupation.

=== Water resources ===
Underground water is the main source of fresh water in Egypt's deserts, which make up 95% of Egypt. Rainwater also plays a role in irrigation in Egypt, but it is a scarce and limiting source for agricultural development. Since the 1950s, Egypt has mixed agricultural drainage water with Nile water for reuse in irrigation.

The Aswan Dam placed a halt on annual flooding of the Nile and allowed for extended sugarcane cultivation albeit the growing of wheat was displaced. However, the Nile floods provided brick-making and house-building labor, and mud became less available due to the Aswan Dam. The Nile also allowed for 124 million tons of sediment to be carried to the sea each year; after the creation of the dam, 98% of that sediment fell under the dam. As a result of the lack of sediment, researchers predict the Nile Delta could be submerged within about 130 years.

The expansion of desert areas since the Aswan High Dam's construction in 1970 has also increased soil salinity, which has allowed waterborne diseases to emerge and jeopardizes the fertility of the soil. Rising sea levels (caused by climate change) and subsidence in the Nile Delta also contribute to soil salinity. In 1994, 28% of Egypt's soils were damaged by significant levels of salinity. Without adequate measures, 15% of the arable land could be lost due to salinization.

== Pollution ==
=== Air Pollution ===
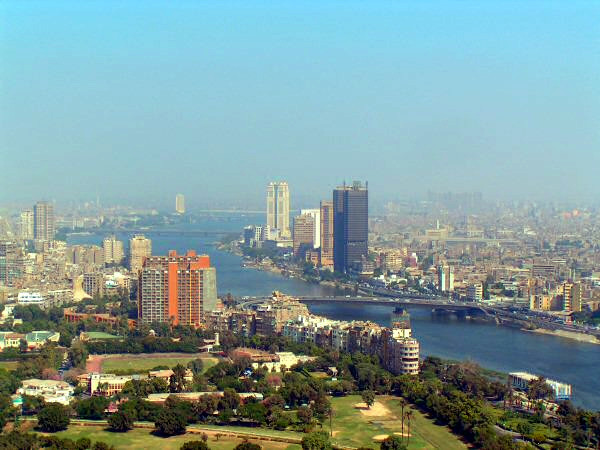
Air pollution in Cairo.

Air pollution in downtown Cairo ranks higher than acceptable world standards by 10 to 100 times. The air in Egypt can be very thick and grey, creating a visible haze over Cairo. Cairo's poor air quality is caused by the lack of rainfall and its layout of tall buildings and narrow streets, which create a bowl effect (bad ventilation and the consequent trapping of pollutants). The main air pollution problem in Egypt is particulate matter. The most notable sources of the dust and small particles are transportation, industry, and open-air waste-burning. The wind blowing from arid areas around Egypt (e.g., the Western Desert) is also a large source of dust. Another form of air pollution in the streets is carbon monoxide from excessive automobile exhaust and factory emissions.

The United States Environmental Protection Agency has published risk data which states that above the safe limit, the risk of developing serious respiratory diseases, cancer and cardiovascular disease from exposure to air pollution (dust and soot, hydrocarbons, and heavy metal compounds) is two people in every 1,000.

=== Noise pollution ===
Rising noise pollution in the 24-hour metropolis of Cairo has reached extremely high levels, leading to health problems. In the city center, noise levels reach an average of 90 decibels (dB) and never drop below 70 dB, comparable to being inside a factory. A 2007 study by the Egyptian National Research Centre (NRC) said, "What's striking about Cairo is that noise levels on different streets at different times of day are well over limits set by the Environmental Protection Agency (EPA)".

=== Impact on agriculture ===
From 1999 to 2010, approximately 176 foreign energy companies invested in Egypt's abundant, fuel resources. Many of these foreign companies including British Petroleum and British Gas, began to build energy and fertilizer plants in Egypt along the Mediterranean coast in Ras El Bar and surrounding governates in order to export fuel. Along the Mediterranean coast, these energy and fertilizer plants produce 70% of national production. The construction of energy and fertilizer plants in Egypt has affected local farming, in particular, by destroying arable land and crop production. As a result, many Egyptians are protesting against the use of these energy and fertilizer companies particularly in Ras El Bar, Idku, and El Dabaa.

==== EAgrium Fertilizer Complex in Damietta ====
A major port city along the Mediterranean coast in Egypt, Damietta, relies on the fishing industry, tourism in Ras El Bar, and real estate as its primary source of income. In Damietta's fishing sector located in Izbat al-Burj surrounded on the east coast by Lake Manzala, approximately 10,000 individuals make their living as local fishers using cheap equipment and boats. Ras El Bar, a middle-class coastal area near Damietta's seaport, is a popular vacation destination for tourists during the summer time. Damietta's elites have permanent residences in Ras El Bar, which contributes to the local real estate sector.

In 2006, the Egyptian Agrium Nitrogen Products Company (EAgrium), a Canadian-based petrochemical company, planned to build a large fertilizer complex in Ras El Bar for the export of urea and ammonia through the EAgrium Marine Terminal. This project was expected to cost around $1.2 billion and produce a maximum capacity of $1.3 million tons of fertilizer. After Damiettans learned of the EAgrium building plan, they feared that their main sources of income and health would be negatively affected by water and air pollution from the fertilizer complex's petrochemicals. The official construction of EAgrium plant in Damietta began in 2008.

A strong opposition of Damiettans formed against EAgrium, which included an eclectic coalition of Egyptians in different social classes and jobs. Lawyers, businessmen, parliamentary members, farmers, professors at universities, and members of volunteer organizations or unions were a part of this coalition. Some observers suggested that the local Damiettan officials in the coalition against EAgrium were opposed to the project due to a disagreement between the Damietta Governor Fathy El-Baradie and the central government, and that El-Baradie initiated the campaign against the building of this fertilizer complex. The opposition used a diverse range of protesting strategies including non-violent acts such as strikes, sit-ins, petitions, and road blocking.

The success of this campaign may be attributed to evoking the emotions of Damiettans by increasing their fear of the potential dangerous health effects of the plant, gaining the support from tourism developers in Ras El Bar, and the local government's rejection of the project. In addition, Damiettans sought President Mubarak's help to further combat the construction of the fertilizer complex. After many meetings on this issue between the state and locals, EAgrium did not build its petrochemical plant, but however, was given shares in Misr Fertilizer Production Company (MOPCO), which owns a fertilizer plant in Damietta. In 2011, MOPCO planned to build new fertilizer sites in Dameitta. Although the government decided to suspend construction of these two plants, Damiettans were reluctant to believe the government's suspension. The petrochemical plants are going to be built in Damietta despite protesters demanding to relocate the fertilizer plant to other industrial areas.

==== Idku protests against British Petroleum ====
The governate of Idku located east of Alexandria in Egypt is mainly a fishing and agricultural community with a local population of 250,000 Egyptians that rely on Lake Idku. Idku has a negative history with petrochemical and natural gas companies since the companies neglect environmental issues that may affect the locals. In 2006, the Egyptian Environmental Affairs Agency (EEAA) discovered that the companies, Rashpetco and Burullus, a joint company between BG, EGPC, and Malaysia's Petroleum Nasional Berhad, illegally dumped industrial waste in the Mediterranean Sea. Analysis of water samples dumped by Rashpetco indicated extremely high levels of nitrogen and oxygen, which passed Egypt's mandated, legal levels of these chemicals and have led to the destruction of Idku's marine and terrestrial environments.

When the Idku community found out that the Head of Egyptian Natural Gas Holding, Taher Abd El-Reheem, proposed a project to build a link between the Northern Alexandria Gas Project and the Al-Borlos Treatment Plant with help from British Petroleum (BP) and British Gap Group (BG), they began anti-BP campaigns and protests. After a year of protesting, BP was forced to relocate its proposed pipeline to another area.

== Monuments ==
=== Pollution damage ===
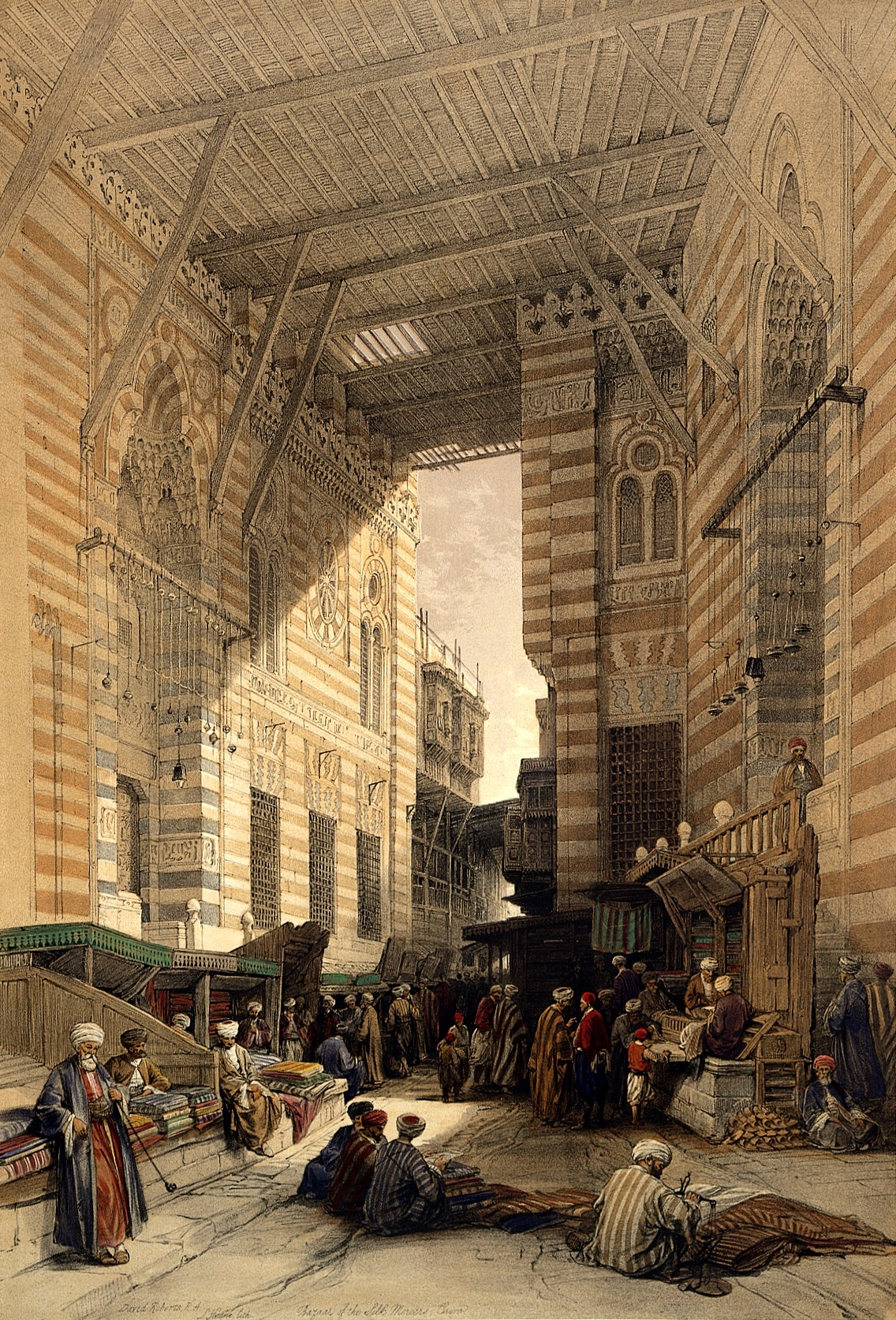
Sultan Al-Ghuri Mosque, lithograph ca. 1848, David Roberts.

Air and water pollution in Cairo has caused white and black crust to form on historical monuments and other places of cultural and historical importance, such as the Sultan Al-Ghuri Complex, pyramids at Giza, Bab Zuweila, Al-Azhar Mosque, and the Cairo Citadel. Combustion of carbonaceous gases in an environment of rising humidity causes the black crust to appear on the top sections of outside walls. White crusts and efflorescences appear on the lower sections of these walls because of rising soil salinity, which increases halite, or rock salt, depositions. The rising, salt-loaded water table in the Nile Delta, where Cairo is located, deposits salts in monuments' foundation stones that rise up buildings through capillary action and are left behind as the water evaporates. The water table is rising throughout Egypt because of sewage leakage and infiltration, factory or agricultural runoff, and inadequate groundwater pumping.

The crust that forms on buildings made of limestone like Al-Ghuri makes them susceptible to erosion, as the crust disrupts the integrity of the stone and falls off, removing the outer surface of the building. A major rescue effort is currently unfeasible because of Egypt's political and economic climate. Salty and wet environments also lead to microbial growth. Without regular cleaning, historic buildings made of limestone, due to their high porosity, will continue to decay as a result of biological colonization.

=== Encroachment of water ===
Sea levels are another environmental problem faced by those charged with protecting Egypt's archaeological sites. For example, the city of Rosetta, close to where the Rosetta Stone was found, is on the Mediterranean coast and will be underwater in a matter of decades unless climate change is addressed on a global scale. Abu Mena, an Early Christian site designated as a UNESCO World Heritage Site in 1979, is one place in imminent danger of destruction. Efforts to reclaim land for agricultural use in the past few decades have waterlogged the usually dry and brittle clay that supports the buildings at Abu Mena.

According to UNESCO, "The destruction of numerous cisterns, disseminated around the city, has entailed the collapse of several overlying structures. Huge underground cavities have opened in the north-western region of the town. The risk of collapse is so high that the authorities were forced to fill the bases of some of the most endangered buildings with sand, including the crypt of Abu Mena with the tomb of the Saint, and close them to the public."

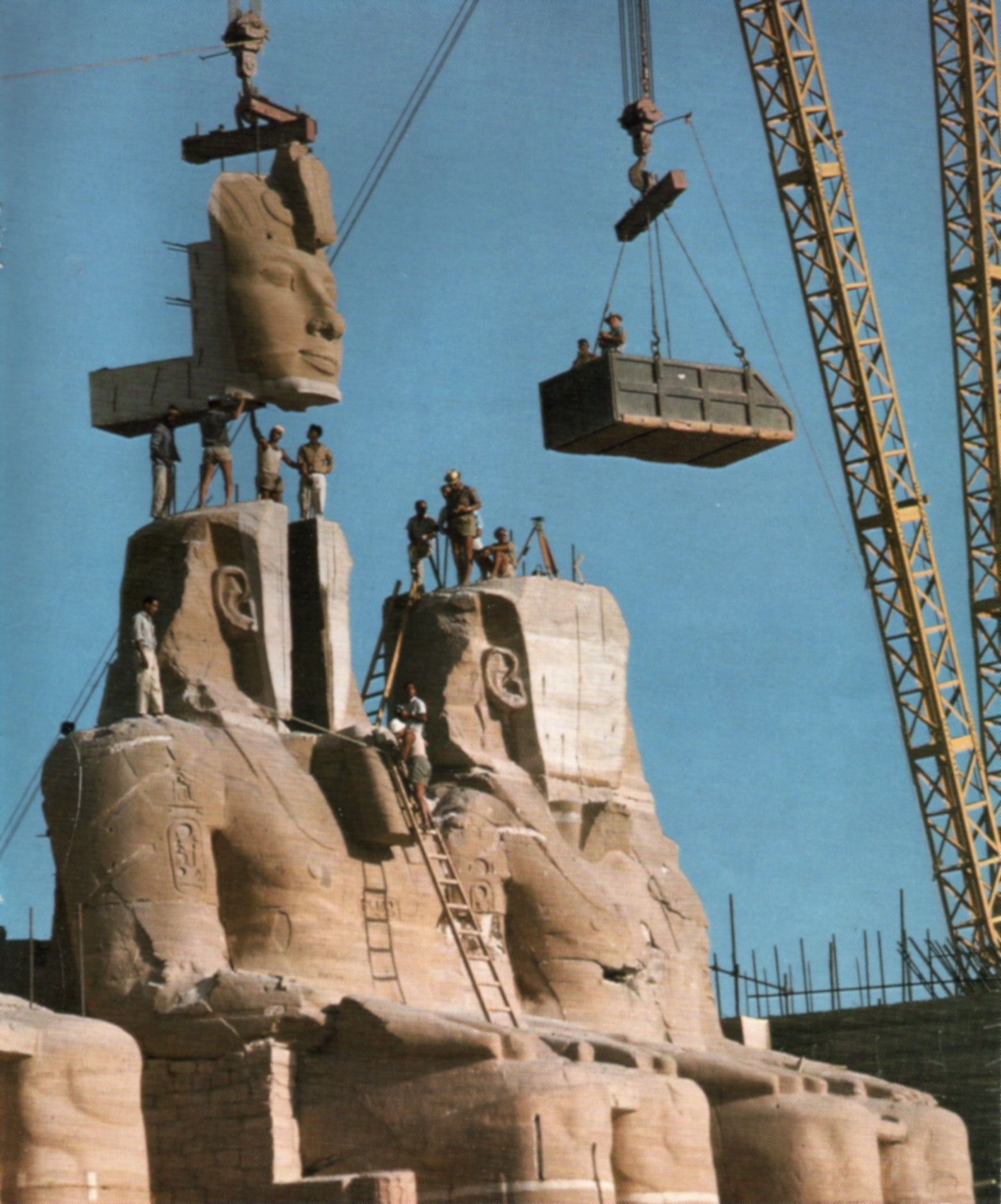
Abu Simbel in the process of reconstruction, 1967.

Egypt has faced similar issues in the past, as the damming of the Nile at Aswan and the subsequent creation of Lake Nasser entailed the flooding of historical sites like Abu Simbel, which comprises two temples to gods of the Ancient Egyptian pantheon. Emergency archaeological digs and projects were conducted to retrieve as much as possible from these sites that have been so well preserved by the arid climate. Abu Simbel itself was cut into pieces and moved to a cliff face above the new water level of the Nile above the dam. It now stands 60 meters above where it originally stood, on a cliff overlooking Lake Nasser.

Another well-known monument moved during the rescue mission was the temple complex at Philae, a Greco-Roman site that was originally a temple to the Ancient Egyptian goddess Isis, now located on the island of Agilkia. Some monuments were given to foreign museums for their aid in preserving sites flooded by Lake Nasser. Four such monuments were the Temple of Debod, now in the Parque del Oeste in Madrid, Spain; the Temple of Ellesyia which is now in Italy; the Temple of Taffeh now housed in the Rijksmuseum van Oudheden in Leiden, the Netherlands; and the Temple of Dendur which is on display at the Metropolitan Museum of Art in New York.

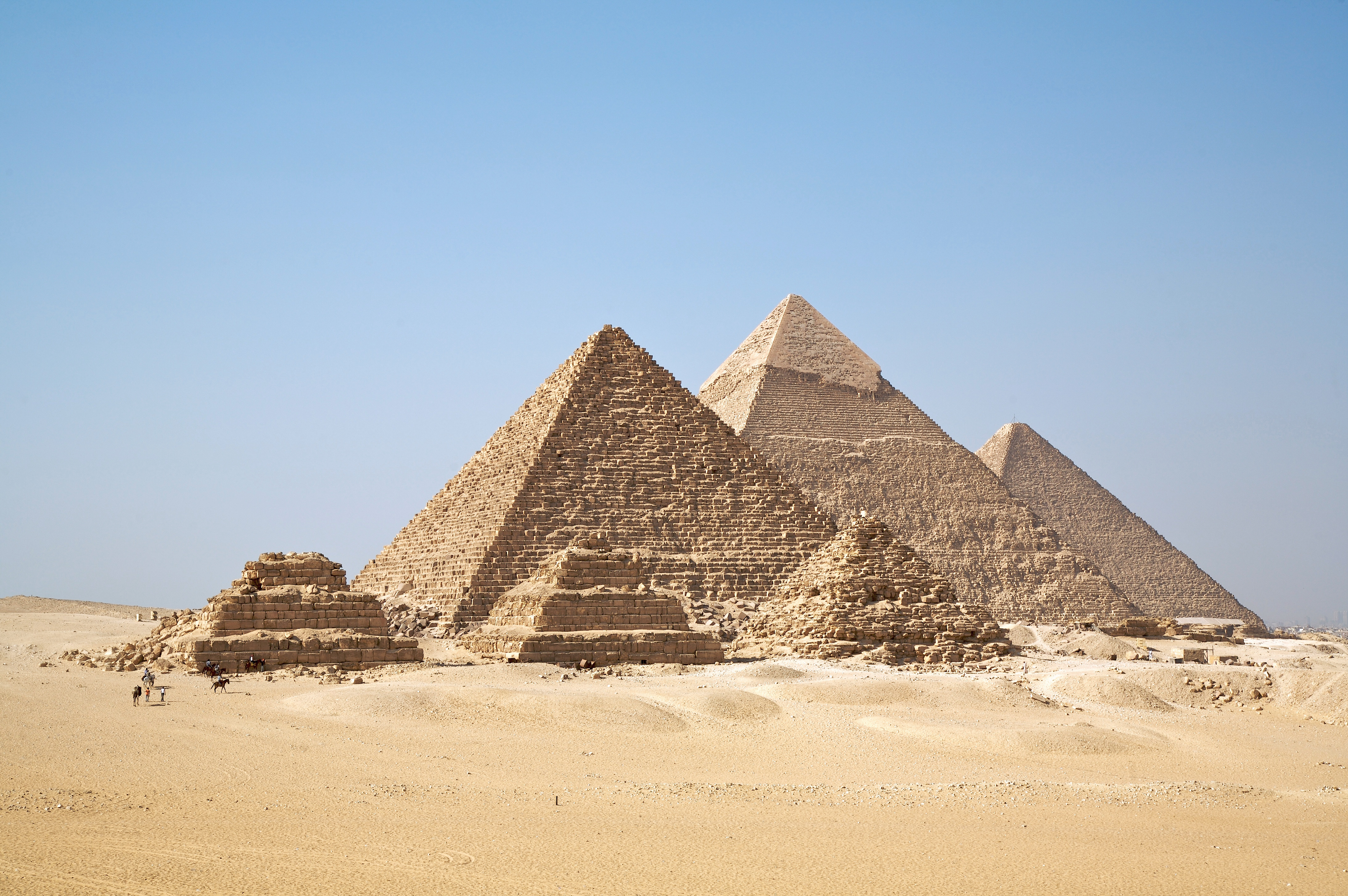
The Pyramids of Giza.

Landscaping conducted to make the Abu Simbel seem more presentable in its new clifftop home has damaged the delicate sandstone rock face. Landscapers brought in sand, which blew in the wind and almost eroded a face of Nefertari on the temple, one of the wives of Ramses II. In an attempt to solve this problem, grass was planted around the base of the temples. Watering the grass also damaged the site by raising the humidity levels in the sandstone.

=== Tourism ===
Tourism causes significant damage to archaeological sites, as people brush up against ancient wall paintings and climb onto parts of monuments to take pictures. Furthermore, much like the limestone monuments inside the city of Cairo proper, the limestone pyramids at Giza are susceptible to changes in humidity and salinity. The breath of tourists inside the chambers creates salt encrustations that crack the interior walls of the pyramids. The pyramids are constantly undergoing repairs to clean salt from the walls in an attempt to prevent further damage. Ventilation systems have been installed inside the Great Pyramid and in other structures on the Giza Plateau to lessen the impact of tourists' breath.

Another problem brought by tourism is graffiti. Graffiti has been left in the chambers of the pyramids since they were being built over 4,000 years ago when workers building the pyramids left their mark on the walls. However, more recent graffiti at the Giza necropolis has damaged sites. Monuments often must be closed and renovated to remove marks made by modern visitors. In 2013, a Chinese tourist carved his name into a wall of the Luxor Temple, in the south of Egypt, causing widespread outrage and igniting an international discussion about tourists and graffiti in general.

=== Urban sprawl ===
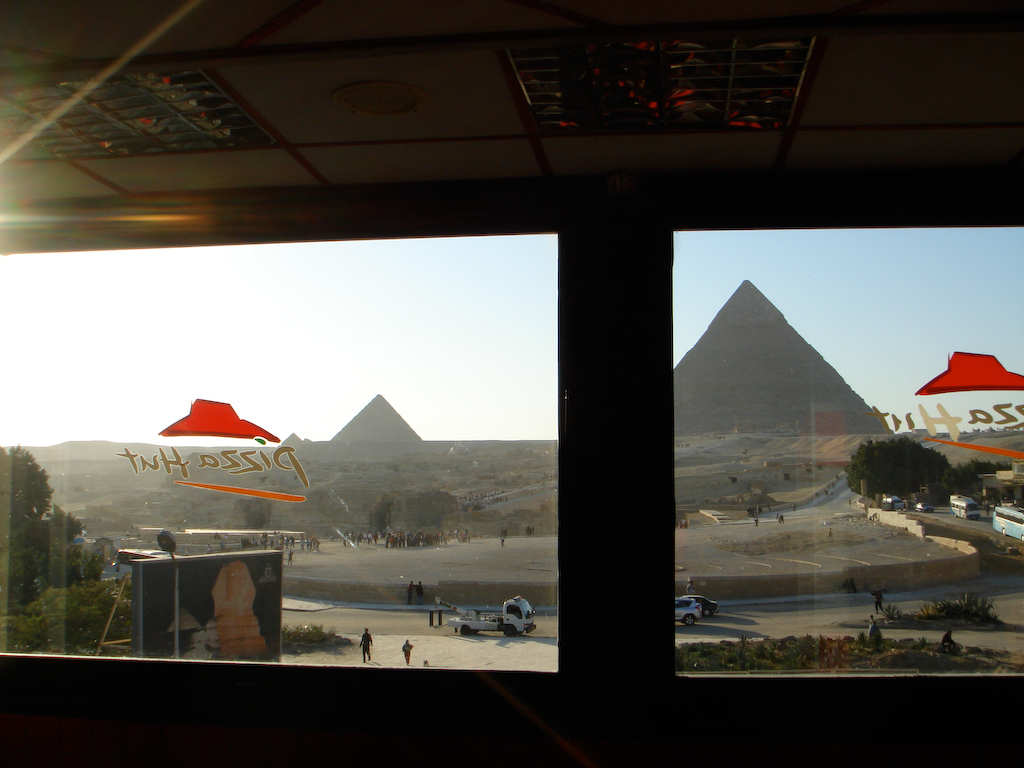
A view of the Pyramids at Giza from a nearby Pizza Hut, 2006.

Urban sprawl has contributed to the degradation of sites, especially in the Greater Cairo area. The Ring Road, provided for in the Master Plan for Greater Cairo passed in 1984, has been the biggest developmental threat to the monuments on the Giza Plateau in the last quarter century. The road was intended to relieve traffic pressure in Cairo but was discovered to be cutting through several protected areas on the plateau, which is the site of the pyramids, the Sphinx, and other lesser-known monuments.

In protest of the planned southern route of the Ring Road, which would encompass the necropolis, UNESCO removed the pyramids from the World Heritage list. The shame and loss of funding resulting from this sanction forced the government to rethink the route of the highway, and the pyramids have since regained their standing as a World Heritage Site.

The city of Cairo has been encroaching on the Giza plateau for decades. The population has exploded so much that there are now apartments only a few hundred yards away from the pyramids. Suburban development, golf courses, and fast food chains now come much closer to the Sphinx and the pyramids than is legal according to UNESCO spokesman Said Zulficar, who has said "It's in total violation of the world heritage convention [Egypt] signed, and it's in violation of Egyptian law."

== Urbanization ==
Egypt is the most populated country in the Middle East and North Africa region (MENA) with over 104 million inhabitants. Since the majority of Egypt's geography consists of expansive desert, 43.1% of citizens live in urban areas along the Nile or Mediterranean Sea, such as Cairo, Alexandria, or Aswan.

Cairo is the largest city in the Arab world, with a population of 12.3 million, and it is also one of the densest. The governate of Cairo was reported to have an urban population density of 45,000 people/km^{2} (120,000 people/mi^{2}) in 2012 (CAPMAS). This is 1.5 times the density of Manhattan. A report from United Arab Emirates University states, "This pattern of urban growth has two contradictory facets. On the one hand, mega-cities act as engines of economic and social growth, but on the other hand, most of this is also being accompanied by the urbanization of both poverty and environmental degradation." Much of government policy has focused on population density as the main contributor to a multitude of social, economic, and environmental challenges, such as noise and air pollution, heavy traffic, limited housing capacity, and poor public health.

Cairo's government officials have been making efforts to decentralize living and working arrangements since 1970 as a way to improve quality of life. Rather than improving infrastructure within the city, many of the proposed solutions involve moving residents into recently-constructed metropolitan areas in the desert. Former President Mubarak emphasized the necessity of desert expansion in a speech to parliament in 2006, stating, "Leaving the narrow (Nile) valley and fanning out, in a planned and organized manner, throughout the country, has become an unavoidable necessity. In view of these facts, the conquest of the desert is no longer a slogan or dream but a necessity dictated by the spiraling population growth. What is required is not a token exodus into the desert but a complete reconsideration of the distribution of population throughout the country." This tactic of spreading into the desert has contributed to other problems, such as interference with agricultural practices and increasingly limited water access.

City planners have proposed the construction of megacities, built from the ground up, to diffuse populations out of Cairo. New Cairo and 6th of October City are brand new subdivisions built to hold millions by 2020 and hold major headquarters currently housed in Cairo. The Egyptian government has also proposed the construction of an entirely new capital city. However, reports show that these tactics have had limited success, and a different approach is necessary to alleviate the impact of many urban problems.

=== A new capital city ===
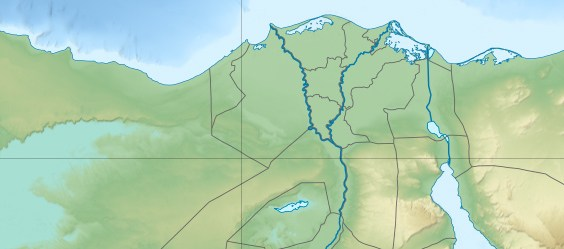
The location in Lower Egypt.

On March 13, 2015, Housing Minister Mostafa Madbouly announced Egypt's plans for a $45 billion project to construct a new capital city just east of Cairo. The new city, which is currently unnamed, is estimated to take only five to seven years to complete and house up to seven million people. Madbouly reported the goal of the project to be a major reduction in Cairo's congestion and population, which is expected to double over the next 40 years. The city's website describes the development as "a momentous endeavour to build national spirit, foster consensus, provide for long-term sustainable growth and address various issues faced by Egypt through a new city, which will create more places to live, work and visit".

The plans have been met with skepticism for being ambitious, as it boasts new administrative and government buildings, an international airport, a technology and innovation park, solar energy farms, eighteen hospitals, and thousands of schools and universities. The situation was complicated further when President Abdel Fatah al-Sisi cancelled the project a month after its unveiling due to a lack of government funds. However, Madbouly stated that the project will continue with funding from the private sector.

=== Green spaces ===
As a Valentine's Day in Cairo is celebrated by an ever-growing number of people, the green spaces that enhance the city's livability have diminished. Incredible levels of traffic combined with severe air and sound pollution severely hinder Cairenes' quality of life. The lack of urban green space is yet another one of these negative factors. Cairo currently has only about 1.65 square meters of green space per capita. This is significantly lower than the World Health Organization's suggestion of a minimum of 9 square meters per person, with the optimal amount being between 10 and 15 square meters. The presence of these spaces has been reported to reduce air pollution while incentivizing physical exercise, fresh food production and improved mental health.

According to architect Nasser Rabbat, Cairo's minimal green space is surprising considering the city's history of parks and landscaping. The capital was founded around a bustan, a modern-day park, and has since been filled with many different kinds of open spaces, such as basatin and mayadin. However, these open spaces with parks and gardens offered ideal locations for development and have since been considered attractive targets for profitable real estate.

Today, Cairo's lack of parks has been exacerbated by rapid increases in development and a lack of urban planning. Where green spaces do exist, they are poorly distributed and inadequately maintained. While some residents are hopeful that the establishment and development of satellite cities will improve conditions in Cairo, others are not as optimistic and foresee further neglect of green spaces in the future.

== Legislative power over land and water ==
=== Egyptian Ministry of State for Environmental Affairs ===
The Egyptian Environmental Affairs Agency is the highest authority in Egypt for promoting and protecting the environment. It is also secondary to bigger ministries in Egypt like that of Petroleum, Industry or Finance. In 1997, Egypt's first full-time Minister of State for Environmental Affairs was assigned to deal with environmental policies for sustainable development.

The Ministry of State for Environmental Affairs (MSEA) and its executive arm, the Egyptian Environmental Affairs Agency (EEAA), consider the management of natural resources in all of Egypt's national policies and projects. The main objective is to preserve natural resources, biological diversity and national heritage in the context of sustainable development. Environmental Protection Agency scientists signed an agreement with counterparts in Egypt to protect human consumption from microbiological contamination in drinking water.

Rural inequality is an issue in Egypt's agricultural development. Central government policies and wealth have been a core political issue concerning the relationship between rural population and the state. International development issues, as with the Grand Renaissance dam issue, are debated in terms of the proper management of resources. Timothy Mitchell, a political scientist that studies the Arab world, suggests that a solution may be to "decentralize the state and allow for some of the powers in Egypt's market to be reconfigured". In this way, Egypt can counteract agricultural differences based on the management of the Nile, which is a shared agricultural source for most of the nine countries that depend on its natural resources.

== Egypt's hydropolitics ==
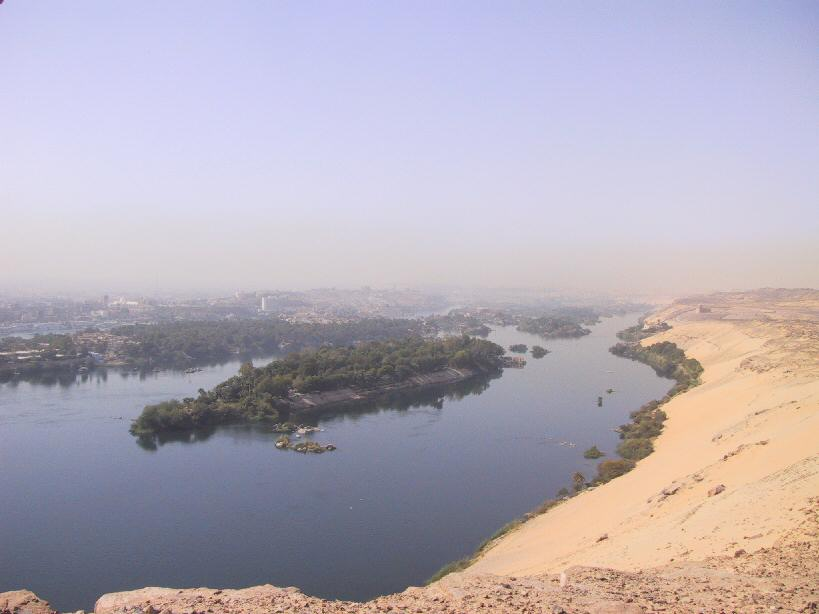
The Nile River passes through 9 countries before it reaches the floodplains of Egypt.

Egypt is part of the Nile Basin alongside Sudan, Ethiopia, Uganda, Kenya, Tanzania, Burundi, Rwanda and the Democratic Republic of Congo. The allocation of power over the use of the Nile has been a source of conflict for years. The Nile is a symbol of Egypt's nationalism, which has led to strong opposition from neighboring countries. The Nile River provides irrigation, hydroelectricity and industrialization for Egypt. Egypt claims to support and stress the importance of water and agricultural projects in order to preserve its environment and allow for the Nile to develop an abundance of resources. Egypt has once threatened to go to war over water conflict against Ethiopia and Tanzania in the past.

=== Egypt's hydropolitical framework ===
- Nile Basin Initiative

An initiative that mediates the Nile Basin for all countries that share the river in order to share socioeconomic benefits of the Nile and the promotion of regional peace and security.

- Environment's Civil Society

Egyptians are active on land rights and land reforms. The 1997 repeal of Nasser-era land reforms policies and the Land Center for Human Rights were some of the changes of Egypt's environmental political activism. In Sinai, Egypt the lack of land reforms to stabilize the security crisis in Sinai by Mohamed Morsi, Hosni Mubarak and Abdel Fattah el-Sisi.

- Environmental foreign relations in Egypt

Egypt has had a significant role to play in mediating conflicts of Arab States and East African states. Egypt was a mediator in resolving disputes between Arab states. Sudan and Egypt relations are weak; presently is a territorial dispute with Sudan over the Halaib Triangle. However, both countries are in agreement with the issue of water access and water rights on behalf of the Grand Ethiopian Renaissance Dam.

=== The Grand Renaissance Dam issue ===
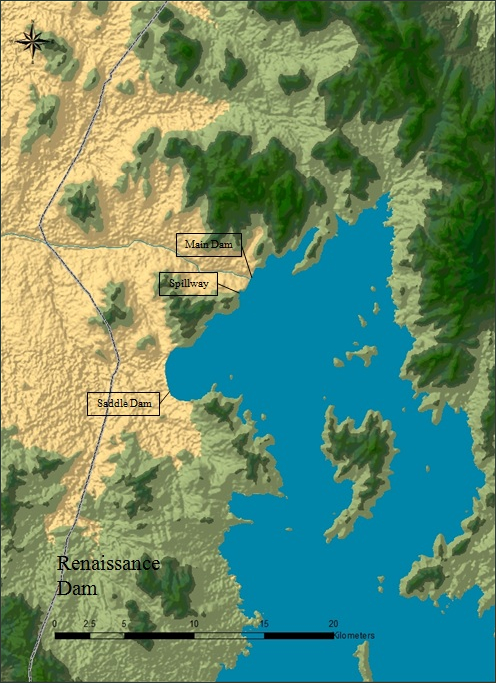
Renaissance Dam location.

Egyptian nationalists have denounced Ethiopia's new project, The Grand Ethiopian Renaissance Dam. The Great Renaissance Dam will be Africa's largest hydroelectric facility and will affect Sudan's and Egypt's political relations with Ethiopia. In 1959, Egypt and Sudan made an agreement that allowed Egypt to have 70% of the Nile's water flow while Sudan had 30%. In 2013, protestors gathered in front of Ethiopian embassy in Cairo, as then Morsi administration allowed for the project to proceed. Egyptian administrations have attempted military solutions to halt the project, but the Egyptian government at the time did not pursue.

The Italian Salini (Salini Impregilo) Company is building the Renaissance Dam after signing a contract with the Ethiopian government in December 2010 worth $4.65 billion to be completed in six years. Egypt's Minister of Water Resources and Irrigation visited Italy to explain the country's water security. Egypt is continuing international influence to protect their share of the Nile waters, as well as contacting international donors, the World Bank and the African Development Bank to not give technical support for the construction of the dam in order to halt any damage to Egypt. Ethiopian Prime Minister Hailemariam Desalegn declared that Ethiopia would not back down from building the Renaissance dam. There was no clear agreement made by water ministers of Egypt, Sudan and Ethiopia. Egypt planned to send foreign experts to follow on how to implement experts' reports on behalf of building the dam first.

On April 13, 2014, Ethiopia's National Panel of Experts faced controversy with the US-based International Rivers Network, an anti-dam organization founded in 1985. The IRN criticized the construction of the dam and sought to prevent international aid to the project, which resulted in accusations that the organization was "being paid by Egypt in order to lobby against the Renaissance Dam". The creation of Grand Renaissance Dam would not affect Egypt's share of Nile as it is not constructed for irrigation but rather hydroelectricity. Water may be lost from evaporation, but Egypt and Sudan will benefit from the dam due to the trapped sediments that would otherwise flow downstream, prolonging lives of major reservoirs in both countries. Despite Egypt's attempts to gain support in order to halt construction of the dam, the dam finished construction in 2023 and officially opened on September 9, 2025.

== Egypt's water resource projects in the Upper Nile ==
These are some projects in which Egypt has tried to utilize the Nile and nearby rivers.

The Charter of Integration between Egypt and Sudan:

- The Jonglei Canal project in Bahr al-Jabal and Bahr az-Zaraf Area was constructed to prevent waste of water, approximately 15 billion cubic meters, due to evaporation in swamp areas.
- The Mashar Swamps project was created to collect lost water from Mashar swamps and Sobat River.
- The Northern Bahr al-Ghazal project was constructed to combat the loss of intensive evaporation. The project was constructed by digging a canal in order to collect and channel water from the northern part of Bahr al-Ghazal with the White Nile.
- The Southern Bahr al-Ghazal project was constructed so that the river waters from Bahr al-Ghazal would flow east towards Bahr al-Jabal.

=== Additional Egyptian projects ===
Along with the projects made between Sudan and Egypt, Egypt has considered storage projects in equatorial lakes: Lake Victoria, Lake Kyoga, and Lake Albert. Egypt is in participation with Ethiopia and Uganda in some projects and establishing power generation stations. Egypt financed several contributions made to water conservation: the assessment of available water resources, climate change, drought, Basin's water quality, and water planning. Egypt has constructed over the course of its history several other projects, such as Mahmoudiyah canal, Suez Canal, Aswan Dam, and Toshka (otherwise known as the New Valley Project). The Aswan Dam was constructed as Egypt's main source of yielding electric power.

The New Valley Project was designed as a second Nile Valley located in the south of Egypt's Western Desert. The East Owainat Project is another development project in the southern valley of Egypt, which is irrigated by a nearby groundwater reservoir. The purpose of the East Owainat Project is to export organic crops for the trade of which these are: medicinal herbs, fruits, and various grains. The As-Salam Canal project is another development project that has a great impact on surrounding cultivated area with that of the Nile water and agricultural drainage water. The project Al-Ein Es-Sokhna New Port is located near the Suez Gulf and is a 4 km canal that connects the passage route of the Suez Canal to the Al-Ein Es-Sokhna New Port that has four basins to accommodate ships. These projects have contributed to water engineering, conservation, and distribution in Egypt and surrounding areas.

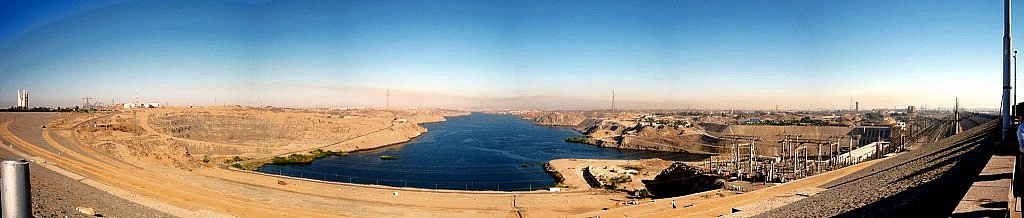
View of the Aswan Dam.

== See also ==
- Animal welfare in Egypt
- Climate change in the Middle East and North Africa
- Economy of Egypt and the environment
- Hydrogen economy
- Leapfrogging from natural gas to hydrogen
- Methane pyrolysis
- Waste Management in Egypt
