= Healthcare in Egypt =

Life expectancy at birth in Egypt

Healthcare in Egypt is based on a pluralistic system, comprising a variety of healthcare providers from the public as well as the private sector. The government ensures basic universal health coverage, although private services are also available for those with the ability to pay. Due to social and economic pressures, Egypt's healthcare system is subject to many challenges. However, several recent efforts have been directed towards enhancing the system.

== Healthcare system ==
Healthcare in Egypt consists of both a public and a private sector. For several decades, the government has provided a subsidized healthcare system that is meant to ensure health care for those who cannot afford it. The system relies on four distinct financial agents, including the government and the public sector as well as private organizations and out-of-pocket payments made by individuals and families. Due to its pluralistic nature, healthcare providers from the various sectors compete. Therefore, patients have the liberty of choosing their doctor on the basis of their financial abilities.

Egypt's healthcare system has evolved significantly over the past several decades, shaped by state policies, economic liberalization, and structural reforms. Following the 1952 revolution, the government enshrined healthcare as a constitutional right, nationalizing existing medical infrastructure and expanding healthcare facilities nationwide. However, economic liberalization policies introduced in the 1970s led to a widening gap between public and private healthcare services. While private hospitals catered to the growing affluent classes, public sector healthcare suffered from underfunding, overuse, and declining quality. These disparities intensified in the 1990s and 2000s with the adoption of market-driven policies, increasing out-of-pocket expenses and fueling the migration of health professionals to the private sector.

In 2020, there were 121,394 physicians in Egypt, equating to 1.19 physicians per 1,000 people. The country had 121,617 hospital beds, with 38,939 managed by the Ministry of Health and Population.

=== Public healthcare ===
The Ministry of Health and Population oversees most public hospitals, while the Ministry of Higher Education and Scientific Research manages university hospitals in each governorate with a medical school, offering free medical services. Other ministries operate their own hospitals exclusively for employees and their families. Additionally, the Ministry of Defence and Ministry of Interior run hospitals, where treatment may be restricted to service members or require out-of-pocket payments for non-military patients.

There are two main quasi-governmental insurers. The Health Insurance Organization (HIO), is the largest public health-care payer, along with the Curative Care Organization (CCO). Their services are provided under the form of basic coverage. The HIO covers 60% of the population, including employees, students, and widows through premiums deducted from employee salaries and employer payrolls. The organization operates its own network of medical facilities and at times contracts with private healthcare providers. The Curative Care Organization (CCO) offers inpatient and outpatient care in specific governorate through contracts with other entities and individuals. Many mosques and churches also operate their own subsidized or free clinics, especially in the large cities.

The health ministry provides family medicine through a vast network of primary health care units, covering nearly every neighborhood and village. These facilities offer acute and chronic illness care, vaccinations, contraceptive services, and antenatal care, with consultations, basic tests, and prescriptions provided free of charge. However, most people seek primary care at public hospital outpatient clinics.

The Universal Health Insurance project is a new mandatory health insurance system in Egypt, operating in accordance with Law No. 2 of 2018. It aims to replace the current health insurance system gradually through diffusing into the country's governments. Its umbrella covers all citizens participating in the system. Universal Health Insurance differs from the Health Insurance Organization in that the family will be considered the main unit of insurance coverage within the system. Another difference is that Universal Health Insurance is based on separating funding from service provision, and the Universal Health Insurance Authority may not provide treatment services or participate in providing them, but its role is to contract different health care providers (public or private) to provide services for the insured citizens. Insurance premiums for low-income households, informal workers and vulnerable groups are subsidised.

=== Private healthcare ===
There are also private insurance options and a network of private healthcare providers and medical facilities. The private sector includes for-profit clinics, hospitals, and pharmacies. The private medical sector is deemed superior to the public services, in terms of quality. Statistics show that the private sector is the initial choice of a healthcare provider in Egypt, even among the lowest income groups.

The private sector accounts for an estimated 60% of all healthcare services. This encompasses both for-profit and nonprofit organizations, ranging from traditional midwives and private pharmacies to independent doctors and hospitals of various sizes. Additionally, numerous nongovernmental organizations operate within the sector, including religiously affiliated clinics and charitable institutions, all of which are registered with the government. As of 2021, Egypt had 1,145 private hospitals, marking a 23.69% increase since 2011. Private healthcare facilities in Egypt are generally of a high standard.

== Challenges and shortcomings ==
=== Challenges ===
Egypt is now considered the second most highly populated country in the MENA region, with Cairo being among the world's most densely populated cities. The Egyptian population is relatively young, with 37% being children under the age of 15. The high population density, as well as increasing fertility rates, have challenged the healthcare system. High levels of pollution and overcrowding trigger health concerns. Egypt is a lower-middle-income country with high levels of unemployment. Despite the government's efforts to further the economy, 32.5% of Egyptians live in extreme poverty. With an increasing population and changing socioeconomic environment, Egypt faces great challenges in adapting to such developments in terms of healthcare facilities.

=== Shortcomings ===
Medical care offered by the public health insurance system is generally of poor quality. Although the system ensures basic universal coverage, it faces several shortcomings in terms of quality of service due to underfunding. Only 4.75% of the GDP in Egypt is dedicated to investments in healthcare services. Almost half of the public healthcare facilities have shortages of medical equipment and personnel. It is presumed that only 20% of the 660 government hospitals are committed to safety and infection control standards. Only about 6% of Egyptians covered by the Health Insurance Organization utilize its services due to dissatisfaction with the level of services it funds. In 2007/2008, 60% of health expenditure in Egypt was paid out of pocket by people seeking treatment. Excessive reliance on out-of-pocket financing of medical treatments creates inequalities of healthcare access. In 2007, more than 1/5th of the population struggled with catastrophic healthcare-related payments. Additionally, there is a gap in terms of availability of medical services between the capital Cairo, and other rural areas.

== Improvements ==
During the past decade, the Egyptian healthcare system has improved in several aspects despite its pitfalls. By 2006, 95% of the population had access to primary healthcare within 5 km, and 98% of citizens were offered vaccinations. Egypt is working on an overhaul of its public healthcare system to improve its quality. On 11 January 2018, the Ministry of Health and Population launched the National Health Insurance project and increased its expenditure on healthcare services. The project aimed at providing more regular checkups for citizens as well as improving the quality and efficiency of the system. The Universal Health Insurance Law also attempts to extend healthcare coverage to a wider portion of society, rather than on a case-by-case basis.

While significant progress has been made in HTA implementation in Egypt, there is still a long way to go to achieve full and fruitful benefits. The proposed roadmap with specific actions aims to establish a successful HTA structure and related activities in the country. This includes a focus on innovative pharmaceuticals with significant budget impact, with future expansion to additional technologies within the scope of HTA.

== Health technology assessment implementation in Egypt ==
Egypt, as a lower-middle-income country with a population of approximately 102 million, is undergoing significant changes in its healthcare system. The introduction of Universal Health Insurance (UHI) and increased health spending are part of efforts to address systemic inequalities and inefficiencies in the healthcare system. The implementation of Health Technology Assessment (HTA) is seen as a crucial step in this transformation.

A study was conducted among Egyptian healthcare sector decision-makers to propose an implementation roadmap for HTA. This roadmap is based on the national healthcare system's current status and includes interviews with experts representing the Egyptian healthcare system's middle and top-tier management.

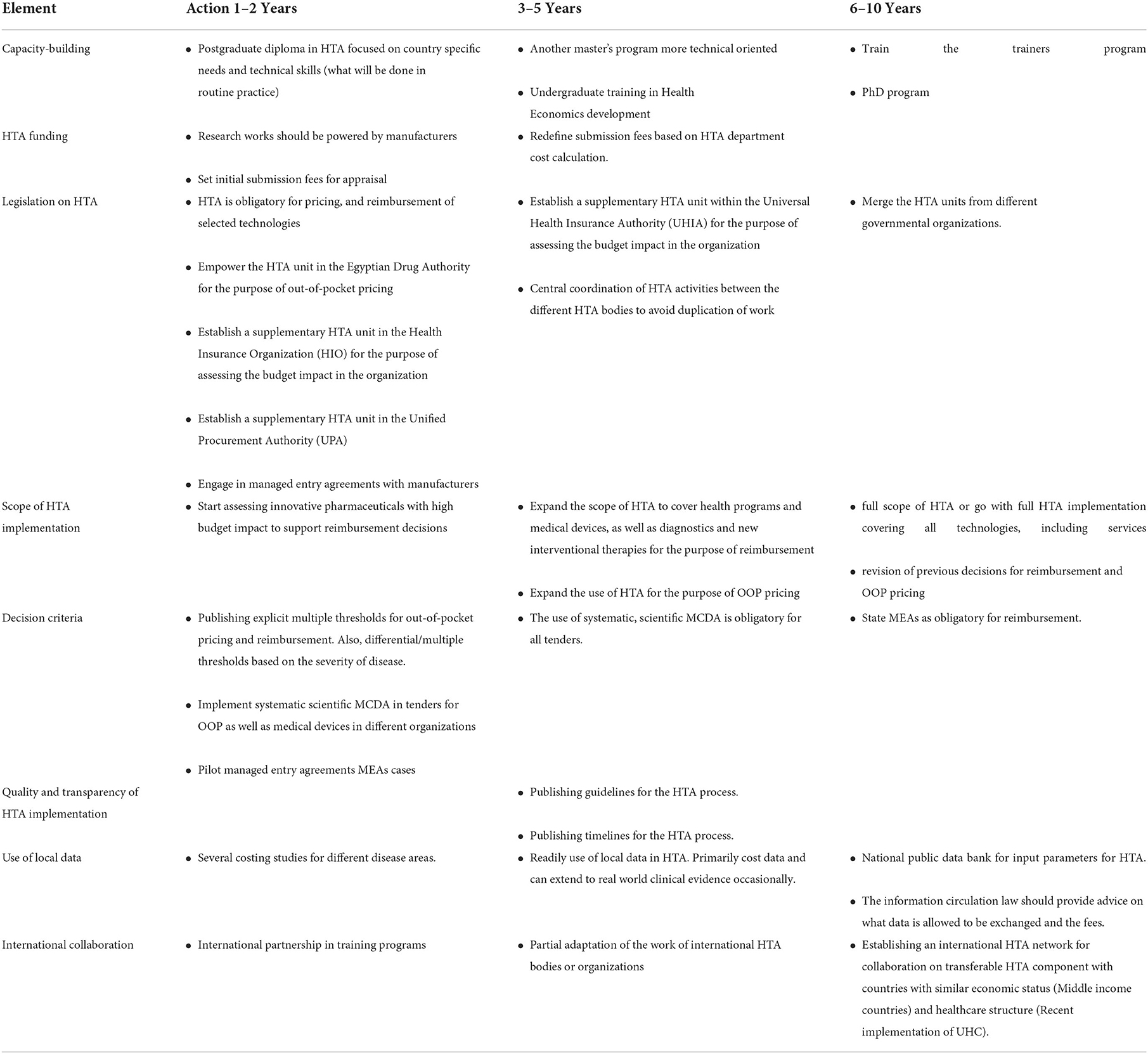
HTA implementation in Egypt recommendations for specific actions.

=== Capacity building ===
Experts recommended enhancing HTA and health economics capacity through more postgraduate programs tailored to country-specific needs. These programs should encompass not only theoretical knowledge but also practical, hands-on training. The proposal includes a timeline for developing these capacities, emphasizing the need for multidisciplinary skills in HTA, especially in health economics.

=== Funding ===
For the assessment and critical appraisal aspects of HTA, private funding through submission fees is viewed as the most feasible option for the next decade. However, some public funding will be necessary, especially where HTA is initiated by public or academic institutes. The approach recommends a balanced funding model for critical appraisals, combining public and private sources.

=== Legislation ===
It's proposed that HTA should be mandatory by law for pricing and reimbursement, especially for high budget impact innovative technologies. The establishment of HTA units at various health authorities, with a long-term goal of merging these into a single central HTA unit, is also recommended. Initially, the focus should be on innovative pharmaceuticals, with a gradual expansion to cover all health technologies.

=== Decision criteria ===
The decision-making process should utilize cost-effectiveness and budget impact analyses, alongside other criteria like multi-criteria decision analysis (MCDA) for tenders, especially for off-patent pharmaceuticals.

=== Quality and transparency ===
Implementing guidelines and specific timelines for the HTA process is crucial. However, the full implementation of such guidelines is expected to take 3–5 years.

=== Use of local data ===
The importance of using local data in HTA is acknowledged, but there are challenges related to data availability and legal frameworks for data sharing. Efforts to develop more patient registries and utilize local claims data are recommended, anticipating that the data will be ready for use within 3–5 years.

=== International collaboration ===
Experts support international collaboration for HTA, suggesting partnerships with global HTA bodies like the National Institute for Health and Care Excellence (UK) and others in Europe and Asia. This collaboration aims to facilitate hands-on training and experience sharing.

== See also ==
- Health in Egypt
- List of medical schools in Egypt
- Waste management in Egypt

== Sources ==
- Gericke, Christian A.; Britain, Kaylee; Elmahdawy, Mahmoud; Elsisi, Gihan (2018). "Health System in Egypt". Health Care Systems and Policies. Health Services Research. pp. 1–18. doi:10.1007/978-1-4614-6419-8_7-1. ISBN 978-1-4614-6419-8.
- Rashad, Ahmed; Sharaf, Mesbah (2015a). "Who Benefits from Public Healthcare Subsidies in Egypt?". Social Sciences. 4 (4): 1162–1176. doi:10.3390/socsci4041162.
- Rashad, Ahmed; Sharaf, Mesbah (2015b). "Catastrophic Economic Consequences of Healthcare Payments: Effects on Poverty Estimates in Egypt, Jordan, and Palestine". Economies. 3 (4): 216–234. doi:10.3390/economies3040216. hdl:10419/167728.
