= Waste management in Egypt =

In Egypt, waste and lack of proper management of it pose serious health and environmental problems for the country and its population. There has been some governmental attempts to better the system of waste management since the 1960s but those have not proven sufficient until now. In the last 10 years, focused attempts at recycling are present and growing in the country. But these are largely informal or private actors, and government initiatives are necessary to properly manage these systems and provide them with appropriate resources.

== Historical Overview ==
1950s-1990s: The method used to remove garbage in Egypt from the 1950s to around the 1990s stayed the same. For instance, in Cairo this method involved migrants from rural areas in Egypt who rode donkey carts around the city to collect garbage, then bring it to a North-Eastern district, where others then helped sort it. The sorted solid waste could be used to sell to recycling companies and the organic waste was used to feed their pigs. Due to the growing population of Egypt, the Egyptian government did in the mid-1990s consider making garbage collection the job of companies, both local and international, as a way of expanding garbage or waste collection.

1967, 1976: The Egyptian government took some measures in relation to solid waste management.

1990: The Governorates of Cairo and Giza outlawed donkey carts to collect garbage in order to make garbage collection in these areas more formal and private as part of the Structural Adjustment Program (SAP) introduced by the IMF and the World Bank during the 1990s.

1992: The first National Environmental Action Plan was introduced. This showed how waste was managed around Egypt. Waste collection was around 0 percent in low-income rural areas, where it was around 90 percent in high-income areas in the larger cities.

2002: The National Environmental Action Plan was approved, which introduces a national waste management system.

2003-2004: The Egyptian government signed contracts with private, international companies to handle the garbage collection in a more efficient and formal way. Thereby, the method of garbage collection changed. Garbage from every building was to be thrown in nearby placed bins and then be picked up by garbage trucks. For this service citizens were required by law to pay an extra fee, which was met with public disagreement.

2009: Garbage collection has not gotten better after the involvement of private, international companies. In the two largest cities, Cairo and Alexandria, is the collected garbage recycled but a lot is still left on the streets. In other areas of Egypt is there no recycling. Here the garbage is either also left on the streets or collected and then is thrown in the desert, dumpsites and even in different canals and the Nile River, which has health consequences. Some parts of Egypt are not contracted with international companies anymore, where others, like Cairo, still are.

== Statistics ==
In Egypt solid waste is currently disposed of in dump sites has an indispensable potential for recycling, processing, or reuse. A report on recycled dry waste in 2013 covers plastics, paper, and metals as solid waste which is in the recycling process. However, a bulk of problems are created by not collecting wet organic waste forms which constitute 60 percent of the total waste in Egypt. Municipal waste flow differentiating between urban and rural areas, and approximations have been derived from per capita MSW (Municipal Solid Waste) generation rates by Governorate. National Municipal Solid Waste Strategy in June 2000 has included these estimates without explaining how these estimates were derived. These coefficients were mutual with population data from the 1996 census to derive MSW generation estimates. Consequently, adequate data on generated quantities of solid waste in Egypt is not existing continuously throughout the years. However, WMRA published a report on annually generated solid waste in Egypt for the years 2001, 2006, 2010 and 2012.

Generated Solid Waste in Egypt(Million Tonnes)
Waste Type	2001	2006	2012
Municipal Solid Waste	14.5	17	21
Construction and Demolition Waste	3.5	4.6	4
Agricultural Waste	23.5	27.5	30
Industrial Waste	4.25	4.75	6
Medical Waste	0.12	0.15	0.28
Waterway Cleansing Waste	20	30	25
Total	67.12	86	89.28

Generated Solid Waste in Egypt(Tonnes)
Waste Type	2010
Municipal Solid Waste	13,806269
Construction and Demolition Waste	41,748,603
Agricultural Waste	30.000.000
Industrial Waste	2.906.895
Medical Waste	3,416,254
Waterway Cleansing Waste	3,058,509
Total	94,936,530

By March 2018, 80 million tonnes of garbage is collected in Egypt each year. An estimated 55.2 percent household's solid waste is collected by private companies, while 44.8 percent of the households dispose their waste by dumping it onto the street.

== Waste management process ==
=== Deficiencies ===
Up to 40% of Egypt's generated waste is not operated by public or private institutions, but placed in streets, rivers, lakes, drainage channels or illegal dumping sites. Only an estimated 6% of the produced waste is collected, and only partly recycled. The improper disposal of solid waste pollutes air, water and soil, and compromises public and animal health. Up until 2018, the Egyptian government had been giving little attention to solid waste management, public health and environmental protection. Instead of establishing a unified governmental force to improve the waste management process, authority was dispersed among ministries. Also the Egyptian legislation lacked efficiency. Instead of having a solid waste management law, the legal framework is fragmented in various legislative pieces. Parallel to Law No. 38/1967 for General Public Cleaning and Law. No. 4/1994 for the Protection of the Environment, waste management is regulated in additional updates on waste collection and transfer, the regulated disposal of hazardous waste, or the management of waste dumping sites and landfills.

=== Workers' community (Zabbaleen) ===
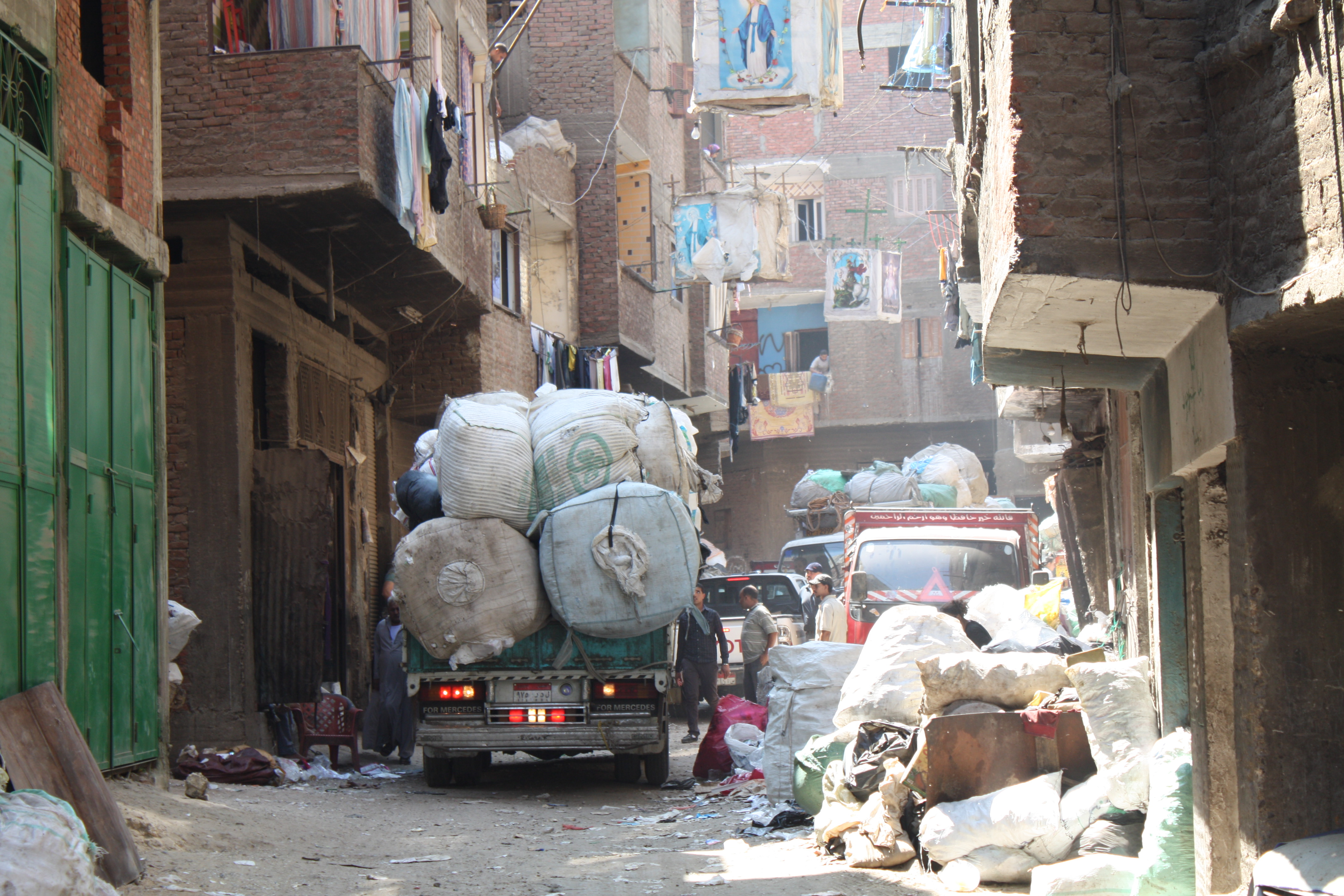
A garbage truck driving through the Streets of Manshiyat Nasser, Mokattam, Cairo

Informal garbage collectors are a key element of Cairo's waste management system. The workers' community, approximately 80.000 to 150.000 members which are mostly Coptic Christians, has been collecting substantial amounts of Cairo's waste since the 1930s. The community, mostly settled in Cairo's ward Manshiyat Naser in the so-called Moqattam Garbage City, has witnessed decades of marginalization. Without governmental support, the community has been living largely impoverished and with only little access to health and social services. In exchange for a relatively small monthly fee paid by every household, Cairo's informal garbage collectors deal with approximately 9.000 of the city's 15.000 tons of daily produced household waste. By collecting, sorting and reselling salvaged materials, workers manage to recycle up to 85% of the collected waste. In the early 2000s, the Egyptian government under Mubarak decided to place household waste collection in the hands of the international companies. In the newly established system, residents had to bring their waste to public collection sites, and to pay larger fees than previously for the waste management services. The community, working with a recycling system that heavily depends upon the use of pigs, witnessed another harsh setback in 2009. In reaction to the spread of H1N1 influenza, the government under Mubarak culled approximately 300.000 pigs and closed down two pork slaughterhouses. Growing public discontent with ineffectiveness and higher costs under the new waste management system induced the Egyptian government to return to the workers community, this time officially incorporating it into the waste management system. Unified in a syndicate, workers are now equipped with uniforms and government vehicles.

In 2016, the French-Tunisian artist eL Seed finished the anamorphic piece 'Perception'. Covering almost 50 buildings in Manshiyat Naser, the artwork shall question judgement and misconception towards the marginalized workers community.

== Initiatives ==
There has been several governmental and civic initiatives to better waste management in Egypt.

=== Governmental initiatives ===
There have been some initiatives from the Egyptian government towards improving waste management in the country. For instance, in 2013 did the Ministry of Environment launch a national campaign, which focused on improving how garbage is collected, transported and recycled. Another example is, in Cairo in 2012 where they started a projected, which involved monitoring the waste management by using IT. Initiatives have also been made to include the citizens of Egypt regarding how they consume, refuse, recycle etc. This means increasing awareness in the public through for instance education and media. A concrete example of this is the latest National Environmental Action Plan (NEAP) of Egypt, which includes investment packages regarding waste management that was proposed to the private sector. One of these packages proposed consumers in higher-income areas to bring waste such as plastics and tins to supermarket chains in order to get a coupon to be used in the stores. Then the staff would sort the brought waste for it to be sold and removed from the store. In late 2018, the Egyptian government launched the App Dawar in Cairo's districts of Maadi and Torra. It encourages users to photograph piles of trash on the streets of Cairo, and to upload them in the app. Dawar will track the location via GPS and send a cleaning team.

PLASTEX 2024: Aiming to support sustainable companies and addressing the challenges concerning recycling e-waste, PLASTEX 2024 has introduced a new Plastics Recycling Zone providing an opportunity to new entrepreneurs and established companies to share and discuss their recycling methods and technologies.

=== Civic initiatives ===
Greenish: This is a green social business initiative founded in 2017 in Cairo, which focuses on upcycling. Their aim is to increase awareness and educate consumers on waste in general and ways of better managing waste. With their educational projects and workshops, they have worked with different schools, NGOs and restaurants.

Up-fuse: This private business initiative designs sustainable high-quality products like bags and accessories as a way of both limiting plastic waste through upcycling plastic bags as well as supporting local Egyptian marginalized communities. With their business they aim to increase awareness and provide practical solutions to environmental problems.

== Recycling ==
Egypt has a number of both formal and informal recycling initiatives. The formal sector in Egypt comprises central government, local municipalities and ministries, small enterprises, international donors and NGOs. This sector collects 810,000 tonnes of waste annually and recycles 45% of this. On the other hand, the informal sector collects over 2.5 million tonnes of waste annually and recycles over 80% of this. This brings in annual sales of over 190 million LE. The majority of this is done by Cairo's Zabbaleen.

A number of recycling sites exist in Cairo. In March 2017, the government adopted a 'Sell your garbage' scheme where kiosks are set up across the city for people to deposit sorted waste. They receive some money in return which can be donated to a charity of their choice. This scheme faced some opposition from the Zabbaleen community as they feared it would diminish demand for their services.

Similar projects have been set up by entrepreneurs in the private sector. Collectors will come to pick up sorted waste from households and take it away to process. Recyclobekia is one organisation that specialises in e-waste, an expanding market. A recent report has highlighted the need to address the increasing need for formal e-waste recycling initiatives. Bekia is another organisation that exchanges solid waste for basic goods such as phone credits, groceries or metro tickets. Go Green is an organisation that collects waste from households, companies, factories and cafes in exchange for cash or household items such as cleaning products or body lotions. Once the organisation sorts it themselves, it is sent onwards to government sanctioned destinations. On top of physically collecting waste, Go Green aims to change Egyptian's mindsets about how they pollute and deal with their waste. The organisations utilise technology, with users sending a WhatsApp message with their location to drivers who come and collect at a suitable time. Much of the recycling process in Egypt is either carried out the informal sector or start ups.

Upcycling schemes also exist, such as turning old fabrics from factories into new textile products or turning old plastic bags into handbags and other fashion items.

Plans are in place to convert a number of landfill sites to recycling centres, one project which has been announced is the Abu Kharita landfill which is the largest in Egypt. Similar projects are under way in Alexandria. A recycling plant run by Green Tech - Egypt exists in Hurghada, and another in Khanka, Qalyubia governorate.

Currently, no waste-to-energy plants exist in Egypt. However, this method has been recognised as holding great potential to address both Egypt's energy and waste needs. Plans have been announced to establish waste recycling plant in Qalyubia governorate which will generate renewable energy. In Beheira there is one biogas plant which produces methane from anaerobic digestion of wastewater. Additionally, Shehata al-Moqadis, head of the Garbage Collectors union, inked a memorandum of understanding on May 21 with an Italian company to build a waste recycling plant. 'The new project aims at running a waste-to-energy plant with a capacity of 600-1100 tons per day that can be used to generate electricity or to produce gas'"

Another scheme supported by the World Bank Group has involved removing up to 40,000 old taxis from the streets of Cairo. These taxis were sometimes up to 40 years old and lacked the technology to prevent harmful greenhouse gasses from entering the atmosphere. To date, the scheme has reduced 310,000 tonnes of carbon from Cairo's emissions output. The old taxis are scrapped and recycled, whilst new taxis are provided to taxi drivers.

== Health and Environmental Impacts ==
According to a study, life expectancy for Egyptians decreases by 1.85 years due to the level of air pollution, one of the worst ranked in the world. Breathe Life estimates there are 67,283 annual deaths from air pollution, with the leading cause being Ischemic heart disease.

The water in Egypt has also been found to contain heavy metal contaminants which can be harmful to health. Lower Egypt releases the most waste into the Nile, it being the most populous, industrial and agricultural country in the basin. Rivers in the upper Egypt area are thought to have reduced fish varieties, phytoplankton and microorganisms. Sources of pollutants in the Nile include, oil pollution, municipal wastewater, agricultural drainage and industrial wastewater, among others. Overall, the water quality isn't at crisis levels, however. Only in local settings the water has been found to contain Coli and so unsafe for use in fisheries and irrigation. Close to industrial discharges and cities the water is quite polluted, but more generally the river holds a high dilution factor.

Cairo also has significant noise pollution. It is ranked as the second noisiest city in the world, with an average of 90 decibels, which is the equivalent to continuously living inside a factory. People living in very noisy cities tend to lose their hearing ten to fifteen years sooner than those living in quieter cities. Continuous noise can also cause stress and anxiety. Additionally, the improper disposal of waste in waterways is causing contamination of Egypt's water supply. Additionally, every October and November, farmers burn their rice straw in the Delta districts causing a thick black smoke cloud to descend over the city. This has a number of health impacts for residents and makes the air harmful to breathe, whilst also eroding the precious historical monuments in the city.

== See also ==
- Environmental issues in Egypt
- Energy in Egypt
- Economy of Egypt
- Climate of Egypt
- Healthcare in Egypt
- Transport in Egypt
