= Health in Egypt =

Health in Egypt encompasses the overall well-being of the country's population. As of 2024, the average life expectancy in Egypt is 75 years, with 73.8 years for males and 76.2 years for females. Healthcare access has significantly expanded in both urban and rural areas, supported by immunization programs that now cover 98% of the population. Life expectancy has increased from 45 years in the 1960s, reflecting advancements in medical services, disease prevention, and public health initiatives. The infant mortality rate has also declined substantially, falling from 101–132 deaths per 1,000 live births in the 1970s and 1980s to 50–60 per 1,000 in 2000, and further decreasing to 16–18 per 1,000 in 2024.

== Infrastructure ==
=== Water supply and sanitation ===
Water access in Egypt has improved significantly despite ongoing challenges. Between 1990 and 2010, piped water coverage increased from 89% to 100% in urban areas and from 39% to 93% in rural areas, leading to the elimination of open defecation in rural regions and achieving near-universal access to an improved water source. By 2015, 90% of the population had access to safely managed drinking water, rising to 96.9% by 2019. Similarly, sanitation coverage expanded from 50% in 2015 to 66.2% in 2019, while the proportion of treated wastewater relative to total wastewater increased from 50% to 68.7% during the same period, reaching 74% in 2022. However, historical gaps in sanitation infrastructure have posed serious health risks, with a 2007 report estimating 17,000 child deaths annually from diarrheal diseases linked to poor sanitation.

Access to Water and Sanitation in Egypt (2010)
| | | Urban (43% of the population) | Rural (57% of the population) | Total |
|---|---|---|---|---|
| Water | Broad definition | 100% | 99% | 99% |
| Water | House connections | 100% | 93% | 96% |
| Sanitation | Broad definition | 97% | 93% | 95% |
| Sanitation | Sewage | n/a | n/a | 50% (2006 census) |

Soakaway latrines, which are common in rural areas, often do not work properly due to the high groundwater table, infrequent emptying and cracks in the walls. Thus sewage leaks out and contaminates the surrounding streets, canals, and groundwater. Trucks that empty latrines and septic tanks do not necessarily discharge septage into wastewater treatment plants, but rather dump the content in the environment.

== Health status ==
=== Statistic ===
| Total population (2019) | 100.4 million |
| Gross national income per capita (PPP international $, 2020) | 12,210 |
| Life expectancy at birth (years, 2018) | 72 |
| Probability of dying between 15 and 60 years m/f (per 1 000 population, 2016) | 205/121 |
| Total expenditure on health as % of GDP (2014) | 5.6 |
| Cumulative Count of Patient Deceased due to COVID-19 (Sep,2021) | 16789 |

=== Life expectancy ===
The 2020 average life expectancy in Egypt, estimated by the World Bank Group, was 72.15 years: 69.88 for male and 74.53 for female.

Life expectancy at birth in Egypt

| Period | Life expectancy in Years | Period | Life expectancy in Years |
|---|---|---|---|
| 1950–1955 | 41.1 | 1985–1990 | 63.5 |
| 1955–1960 | 46.4 | 1990–1995 | 65.4 |
| 1960–1965 | 49.3 | 1995–2000 | 68.0 |
| 1965–1970 | 51.6 | 2000–2005 | 69.0 |
| 1970–1975 | 53.0 | 2005–2010 | 69.9 |
| 1975–1980 | 56.8 | 2010–2015 | 70.8 |
| 1980–1985 | 59.9 | 2015-2020 | 72 |

Source: UN World Population Prospects

== Infectious diseases ==
Egypt used to have high rates of Hepatitis C (22%), the highest worldwide, followed by Pakistan (4.8%) and China (3.2%). It is believed that the high prevalence in Egypt was linked to a now-discontinued mass-treatment campaign for schistosomiasis, using improperly sterilized glass syringes. In 2018, the Ministry of Health began a program to screen for and treat HCV. To reach a target population of 62.5 million, residents were screened at multiple healthcare and other sites using a WHO-approved rapid diagnostic test (RDT) that analyzed finger-prick samples for HCV antibodies, Viremic persons received sofosbuvir (400 mg daily) plus daclatasvir (60 mg daily) with or without ribavirin for 12 or 24 weeks, Almost 50 million people (80% of the target population) participated. This program treated over 4 million people with chronic hepatitis C and as a result, Egypt managed to reduce its rate of Hepatitis C to an estimated 0.4% in 2021.

Avian influenza has been present in Egypt, with 52 cases and 23 deaths in January 2009.

With an estimated tuberculosis (TB) incidence of 11 new cases per 100,000 people, Egypt has relatively low levels of TB according to 2005 data from the World Health Organization.

=== Malaria ===
Malaria has a long history in Egypt, with evidence of the disease found in mummies dating back to 4000 B.C.E., including Tutankhamun. Control efforts began in the 1920s when rice cultivation near homes was banned to reduce mosquito breeding. With malaria affecting up to 40 % of the population along the Nile, Egypt made the disease notifiable in 1930 and established control stations for diagnosis, treatment, and surveillance. During the Second World War, cases surged to over three million due to displacement, disrupted medical supplies, and the spread of Anopheles arabiensis, but the outbreak was brought under control through large-scale treatment campaigns and thousands of trained health workers. The completion of the Aswan Dam in 1969 introduced new risks, prompting joint vector control and surveillance programs with Sudan. By 2001 malaria was under control, and a small outbreak in 2014 was swiftly contained. Free nationwide diagnosis and treatment, strong border screening, and regional cooperation have since prevented the disease's return. In 2024, Egypt was officially certified as malaria-free.

During the armed conflict in Sudan that began in April 2023, thousands fled northward into Egypt. To reduce the risk of malaria reintroduction, Egypt maintained cross-border cooperation with Sudan and provided free access to basic health care for all arriving migrants, regardless of legal status. These measures were crucial in preventing the disease's return.

=== HIV/AIDS ===
With less than 1 percent of the population estimated to be HIV-positive, Egypt is a low-HIV-prevalence country. Unsafe behaviors among most-at-risk populations and limited condom use among the general population place Egypt at risk of a broader epidemic. According to the National AIDS Program (NAP), there were 1,155 people living with HIV/AIDS (PLWHA) in Egypt by the end of 2007. UNAIDS estimates for 2005 were higher, putting the number of HIV-positive Egyptians at 5,300.

== Non-communicable health risks ==
=== Smoking ===
Smoking in Egypt is prevalent, with 19 billion cigarettes smoked annually in Egypt making it the largest cigarette market in the Arab world. Inside cafes, hookah (shisha) smoking is common. As of 2012 smoking in Egypt has reached an all-time high with an estimated twenty percent, ten million people, regularly using tobacco products.

=== Obesity ===
Share of adults that are obese, 1975 to 2016

In 1996, Egypt had the highest average BMI in the world at 26.3. In 1998, 1.6% of 2- to 6-year-olds, 4.9% of 6- to 10-year-olds, 14.7% of 10- to 14-year-olds, and 13.4% of 14- to 18-year-olds were obese. 45% of urban women and 20% of the rural population were obese.

Obesity rates rose as oils, fat, and sugars were more regularly consumed, beginning in the 1990s. The cultural appreciation of heavier female bodies is a factor. Another explanation is the degree to which food is the center of social events and special occasions. Heavy consumption of starchy and fatty foods without the presence of a health-conscious exercise culture is a major factor. As parents teach this lifestyle to their children, the prevalence of childhood obesity increases. Today, Egyptian teenagers drink three times as much soda as milk. Ten percent of males and females drink five or more cans of soda a day, which can lead to early osteoporosis in women in the future. These food habits are reinforced by junk food advertisements and the availability of unhealthy food at supermarkets. As a result, teenagers are three times as likely to be overweight than they were 20 years ago.

=== Drug use ===
According to Egypt's National Council for Battling Drug Addiction, the use of recreational drugs among residents of Cairo over the age of 15 has rocketed from 6% to 30% since the Egyptian Revolution of 2011.

== Performance ==
The Human Rights Measurement Initiative found that Egypt was fulfilling 84.9% of what it should be fulfilling for the right to health based on its level of income in 2021. When looking at the right to health with respect to children, it achieves 94.8% of what is expected based on its current income. In regards to the right to health amongst the adult population, the country achieves 88.1% of what is expected based on the nation's level of income. Egypt falls into the "very bad" category when evaluating the right to reproductive health because the nation is fulfilling only 71.8% of what the nation is expected to achieve based on the resources (income) it has available.

== See also ==
- Healthcare in Egypt
