= Ras el-Barr =

Ras Elbarr
- City
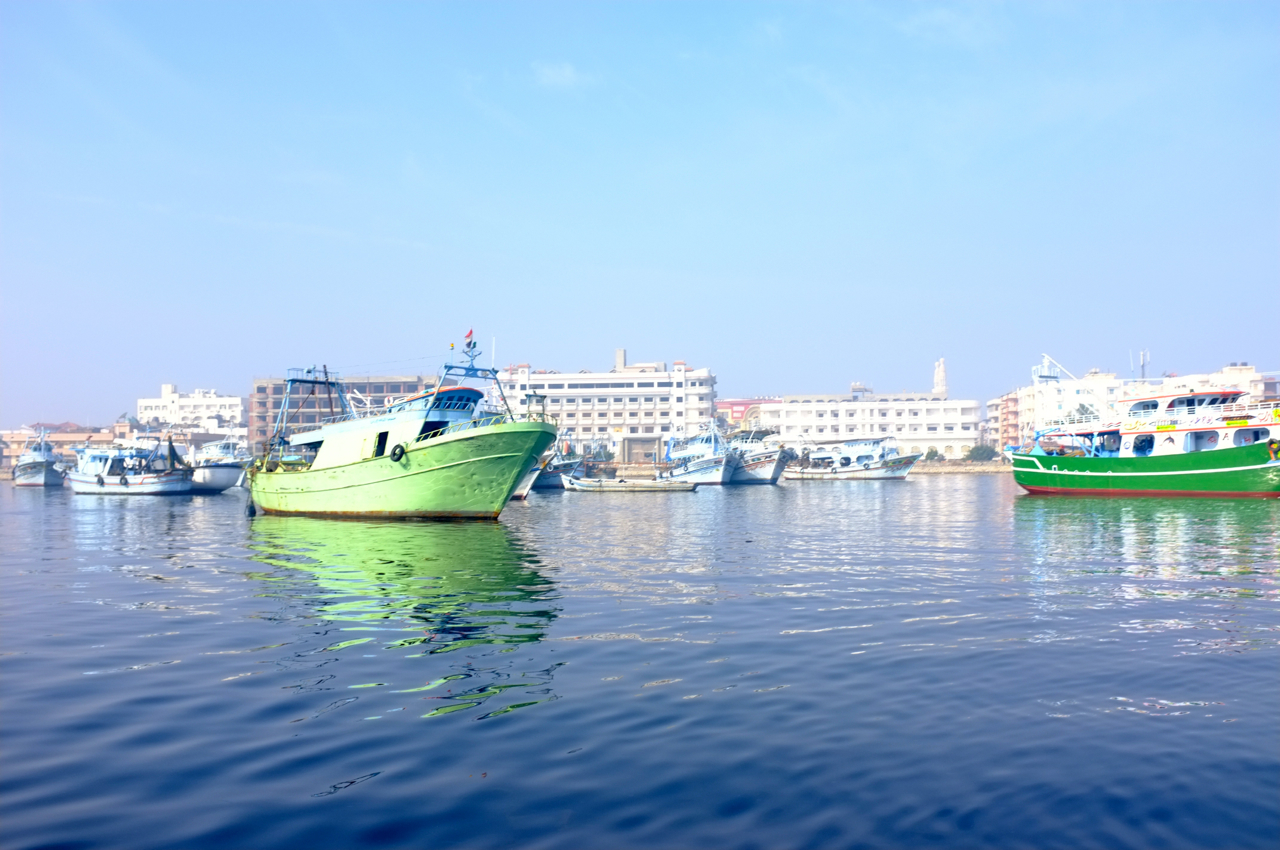
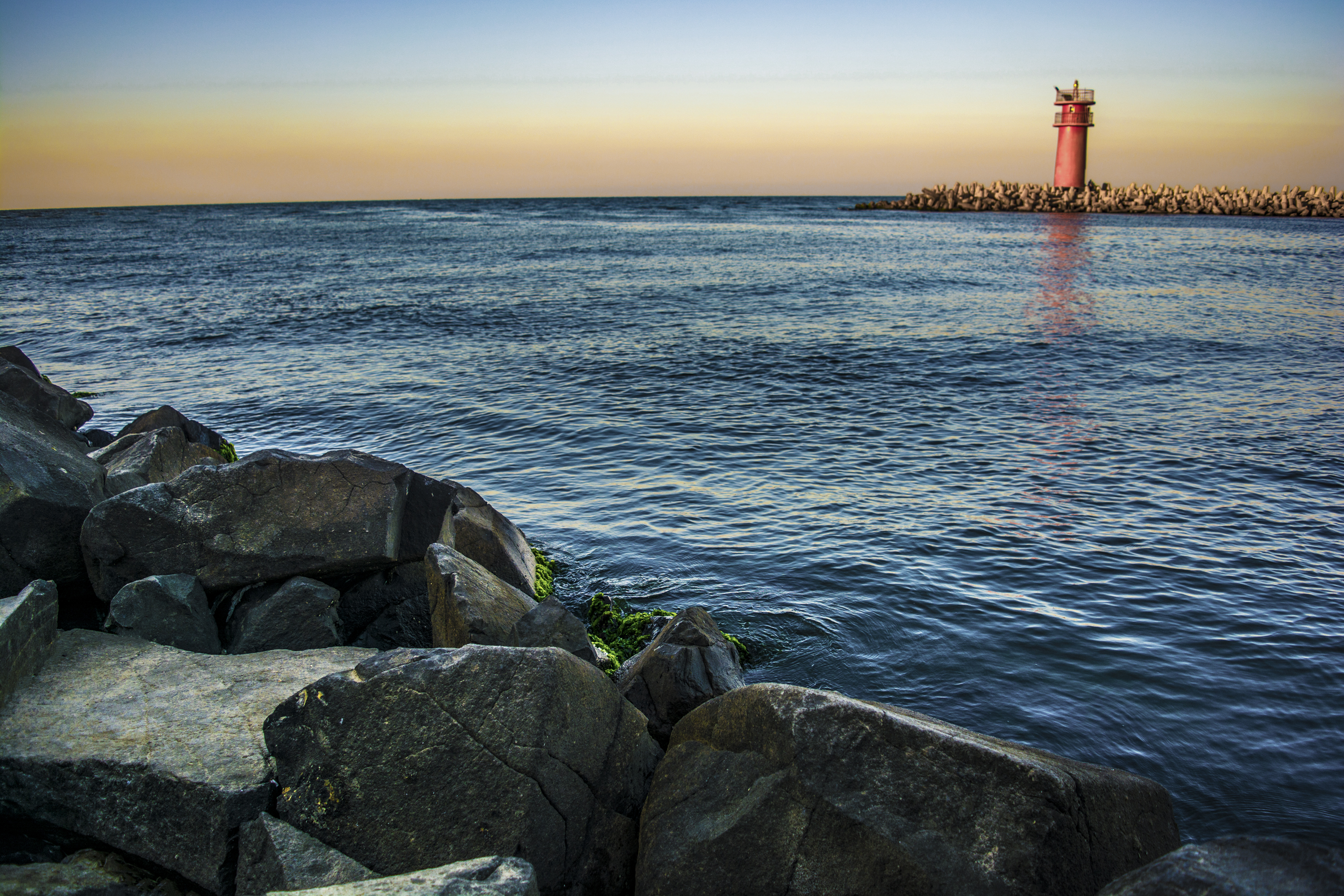
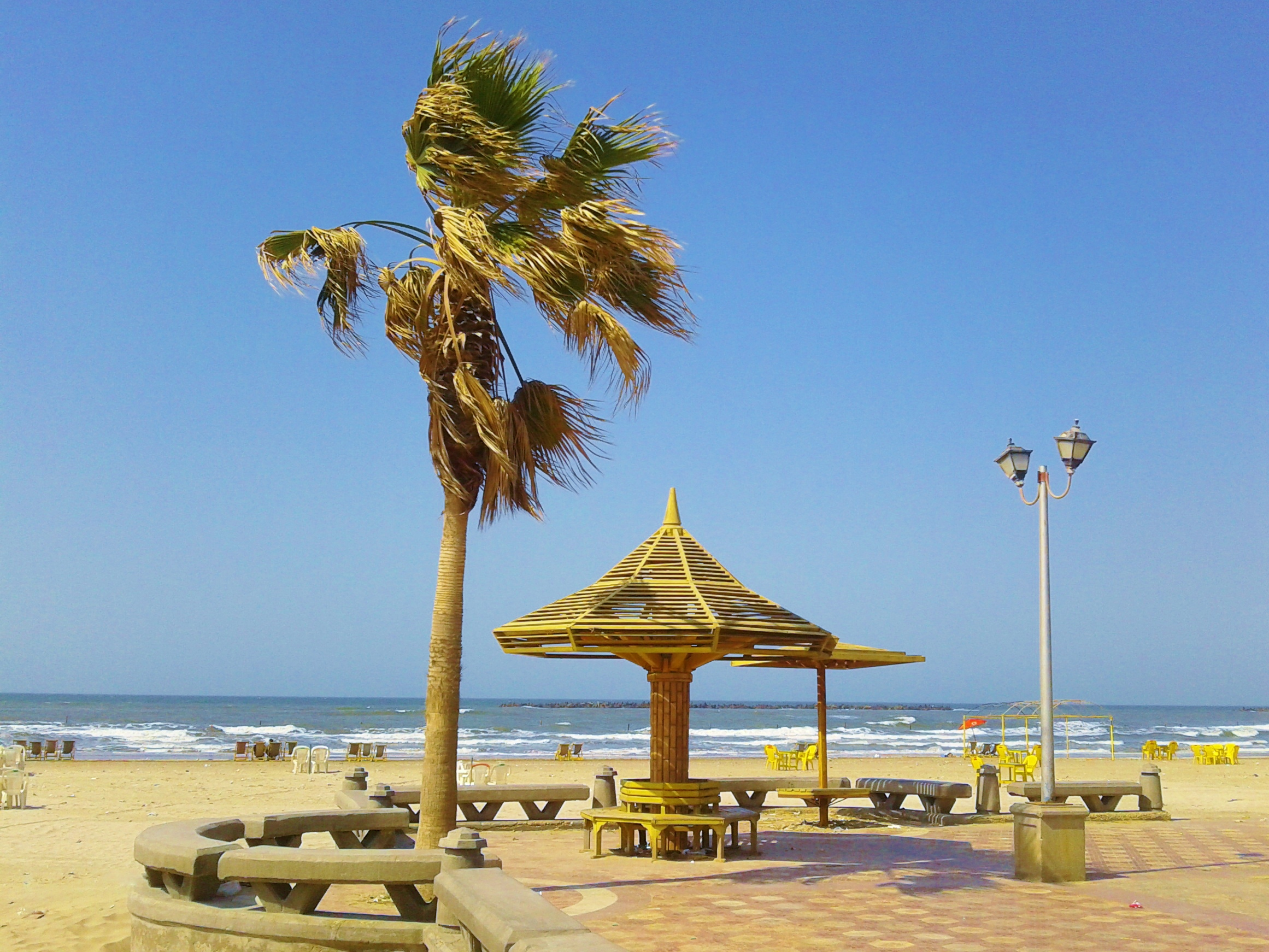

- Location in Egypt
- Coordinates: 31°30′45″N 31°49′32″E
- Country: Egypt
- Governorate: Damietta

Population
  - Total: 250,000
- Time zone: UTC+2 (EET)
  - Summer (DST): UTC+3 (EEST)

Ras Elbarr (Egyptian Arabic: رَاس اَلْبَرّ Rās el-Barr, IPA: [ɾɑːs elˈbɑɾː]), ("Cape of the Land") is a resort city in the Damietta Governorate of Egypt, on the Mediterranean Sea at the mouth of the Damietta Nile branch. There are approximately 25,000 permanent residents; during the summer peak holiday season, from July to September, the population expands to over 250,000.

== Geography ==
=== Location ===
Ras El Bar lies on a peninsula along the Mediterranean Sea, and it is bordered to the east by the Damietta Nile branch. The region of "Lessan" resides in the northernmost part of this peninsula. At this juncture, the Damietta Nile arm converges with the Mediterranean Sea, imparting a triangular shape to Ras El Bar.

=== Climate ===
The climate of Ras El Bar is classified as hot desert (BWh) by Köppen-Geiger system although tempered by the proximity to the Mediterranean Sea.

Climate data for Ras El Bar
Month	Jan	Feb	Mar	Apr	May	Jun	Jul	Aug	Sep	Oct	Nov	Dec	Year
Mean daily maximum °C (°F)	17.1 (62.8)	18.0 (64.4)	19.7 (67.5)	22.9 (73.2)	26.9 (80.4)	28.6 (83.5)	29.8 (85.6)	30.1 (86.2)	28.6 (83.5)	27.1 (80.8)	23.7 (74.7)	19.2 (66.6)	24.3 (75.8)
Daily mean °C (°F)	13.3 (55.9)	13.9 (57.0)	15.5 (59.9)	18.3 (64.9)	22.1 (71.8)	24.3 (75.7)	26.0 (78.8)	26.3 (79.3)	24.7 (76.5)	23.3 (73.9)	19.8 (67.6)	15.4 (59.7)	20.2 (68.4)
Mean daily minimum °C (°F)	9.5 (49.1)	9.9 (49.8)	11.3 (52.3)	13.8 (56.8)	17.3 (63.1)	20.0 (68.0)	22.3 (72.1)	22.6 (72.7)	20.9 (69.6)	19.5 (67.1)	16.0 (60.8)	11.6 (52.9)	16.2 (61.2)
Average precipitation mm (inches)	30 (1.2)	22 (0.9)	15 (0.6)	4 (0.2)	2 (0.1)	0 (0)	0 (0)	0 (0)	0 (0)	8 (0.3)	17 (0.7)	28 (1.1)	126 (5.1)
Source: Climate-Data.org

=== Geomorphology ===
While Ras El Bar is within the Nile Delta, its sandy soils are due to predominant coastal processes with much of the city lying on the foreshore dune structures. Older portions of the city are in the natural levee of the Damietta river.

== Economy ==
There has been gas and oil exploration.

== See also ==
- List of North African airfields during World War II LG-238
