= Hussein Salem =

Egyptian businessman (1933–2019)

- Born: حسين سالم; 11 November 1933; Cairo, Egypt
- Died: 12 August 2019 (aged 85); Madrid, Spain
- Resting place: Egypt
- Occupations: Jolie Ville Resort owner, East Mediterranean Gas Company co-owner
- Known for: Business mogul, relationship with Hosni Mubarak, investigated for corruption and squandering public money

Hussein Salem (11 November 1933 – 12 August 2019) (Arabic: حسين سالم) was an Egyptian businessman, co-owner of the East Mediterranean Gas Company (EMG), and ally and advisor to former president Hosni Mubarak. He was also the chairman and CEO of HKS Group, a hospitality company that operates Maritim Jolie Ville Resort in Sharm El Sheikh. He was described as "one of the most secretive businessmen in Egypt", a mogul, and Mubarak's close confidant.

He was known as the "Father of Sharm El Sheikh" due to his resort development activities. Per Suisse secrets held accounts at Credit Suisse for years, even after he had been publicly accused of bribery.

== Early life and education ==
Salem was born on 11 November 1933 in Sinai Peninsula, Egypt. Records of the Egyptian Administrative Control Authority indicate, however, that he was born in the Helwan suburb of Cairo, although al-Ahram Weekly states the latter location was actually Salem's father's birthplace. His father, Kamal el-Din, worked as a school teacher, but died of typhoid fever during Salem's childhood. Afterward, his family moved to an apartment in the Korba area of Cairo's Heliopolis district.

His mother, Hosnia Tabozoda, who was of Turkish origin, encountered great difficulty providing for her children with her late husband's pension, forcing Salem, the eldest of his two siblings to become the family's main provider. He also had five half-siblings from his father's first wife (Hosnia was his second wife), but was not responsible for them, most of whom were older than Salem. Although it has not been proven, he allegedly has Bedouin origins. Some sources say this was a rumor Salem allegedly spread in order to help him secure future business deals with the Bedouin tribes of the southern Sinai Peninsula. The only known relation Salem had with the Bedouin was through marriage; his half-sibling Samiha married into the Abaydah tribe of Ismailia and Sinai.

During his childhood, Salem's sustained an eye injury, disallowing him from entering the mandatory military service. He graduated from the Heliopolis Public High School, but had to repeat his senior year. In 1956, he graduated from Cairo University's Faculty of Commerce. Shortly after receiving his degree, one of Salem's relatives secured a job for him as a clerk in the Textile Support Fund, which then-president Gamal Abdel Nasser had established to alleviate high unemployment rates, particularly among the youth. Later in 1956, Nasser nationalized the Suez Canal Company, prompting a tripartite assault on Egypt by the United Kingdom, France and Israel. Although Salem favored open markets, there has been no indication that he opposed the canal's nationalization, although he resented Nasser's decision to nationalize the holdings of top capitalists in Egypt in 1961.

In 1959, he married Nazimah Abdel-Hamid Ismail and the couple moved into a three-bedroom apartment in the Golf area of Heliopolis. The monthly rent was E£9 (Salem's monthly salary was E£18). The couple's first child, Khaled, was born in 1961, followed by the birth of their daughter, Magda, two years later. According to one of his neighbors at the time, Salem did not own a car or many luxuries for most of the 1960s and early 1970s. He enrolled Khaled into Saint George, a private British school in Heliopolis, an education that Salem had to frequently borrow money to pay for.

He died on 12 August 2019 in Spain.

== Career ==
=== Gamel Abdel Nasser era ===
==== Egyptian intelligence in Baghdad ====
During the early 1960s Salem landed a job as the branch director for the Arab Company for External Trade in Casablanca, Morocco which paid E£43 per month. A former CEO at the company—which was allegedly a front for the Egyptian Intelligence Services—remembered Salem as a very private employee who traveled abroad often. The CEO believes Salem was supervising arms deals to help nationalist struggles against European colonialism in North Africa, in line with Nasser's foreign policy at the time.

In Casablanca Salem befriended Amin Howeidi who served as Egypt's ambassador to Morocco at the time. That same year, 1963, Howeidi was appointed ambassador to Iraq and he brought Salem with him to serve as the Arab Company's branch director in Baghdad. Salem began cultivating relationships with the high-ranking staff of the Egyptian embassy in Iraq, particularly Amin Yousri the embassy's press-attache and Ibrahim Yousri the embassy's second secretary. Al-Ahram Weekly editor Karem Yehia states that the Yousris claim Salem was a "likable" person, but not "intellectually sophisticated". Howeidi mentored Salem on international politics by enrolling him in study groups particularly after Howeidi was appointed by then-President Gamal Abdel Nasser to the post of Intelligence Director in 1967 following Egypt's defeat in the Six-Day War with Israel.

According to Ibrahim Yousri, Salem gained Howeidi's trust primarily because he was able to regularly provide Howeidi with useful intelligence due to his connections with business circles in Iraq which would have otherwise been difficult to attain through the Egyptian embassy. Amin Yousri claims Salem cultivated good relationships with other Egyptian embassy employees by helping them buy Mercedes vehicles at low interest rates offered by the Iraqi Central Bank. Despite his relative success in Baghdad, Salem did not find his work there particularly fulfilling and requested Howeidi a number of times for transfer to Europe where he said he had "friends" who could help him start a private business. Instead, Salem was sent on ambassadorial missions to Arab States of the Persian Gulf. There he succeeded in establishing his own personal networks that would later become useful during his future business ventures in those states.

Relations between Howeidi and Salem deteriorated following Nasser's death in 1970 and the succession of Anwar Sadat to the presidency afterward. Howeidi, an ardent supporter and symbol of Nasser's socialist and nationalist struggles, was imprisoned by Sadat in 1971; Salem, uninterested in Nasser's ideals subsequently abandoned Howeidi, did not visit him in prison and ignored his wife's phone calls. Nonetheless, Salem lost his job in the Intelligence Directorate along with its perks. His half-brother Abdel Hamid later managed to secure Salem a job at Nasr Import and Export Company that same year by petitioning a senior official in Sadat's administration.

=== Anwar Sadat era ===
==== Business in Abu Dhabi ====
Unhappy at the loss of the prestige and perks of his former intelligence job, Salem decided to move to Abu Dhabi, United Arab Emirates (UAE) in 1972 where he became CEO of the Arab Emirates Trade Company, an importer of food supplies for UAE. He was set up there by former Egyptian economy minister Hassan Abbas Zaki, an economic adviser to the president of the UAE, Sheikh Zayed, at the time. Using his position, between 1972 and 1977 Salem reportedly developed extensive business relations in several Western countries, as well as India and Pakistan. Through these contacts, he gained considerable wealth and began transferring large amounts of cash to Switzerland where he also purchased a number of hotels.

Starting in 1977 Salem's financial situation began to improve considerably. Following then-Egyptian President Anwar Sadat's visit to Israel on 19 November 1977, the UAE downgraded relations with Egypt. Salem had still managed to maintain good relations with Emirati officials, but nonetheless left the UAE that same year. The primary reason behind Salem's departure was not linked to the political situation between the two countries, however. Instead he was said to have been forced out by some Emirati business families who claimed Salem's operations hurt them financially. According to Yehia, some sources say Salem fled hours before his company's headquarters were raided by auditing officials while other sources claim he was actually arrested and spent a number of days in an Emirati jail. Sayed Ali al-Shorafa, Grand High Chamberlain (Director)of the UAE's President's Court, Stated Salem was not charged with a crime and was subsequently pardoned by Sheikh Zayed. He also denied rumors that Salem had amassed $20 million in Abu Dhabi, stating "These are exaggerations ... We did not have anyone in the Emirates who had more than a million Dirhams at that time." Contrarily, Amin Yousri claimed that Salem had directly informed him that he acquired $200 million in the UAE which he transferred to his Swiss bank accounts. He would later relocate half of his money to Spain, according to Yousri, where he gained Spanish citizenship and bought a mansion in Majorca.

==== Return to Egypt and move to Washington, D.C. ====
Salem returned to Egypt following his business ventures in the UAE. In addition to his history with the Egyptian government, he had established relations with highly influential figures in Egypt by appointing their sons or relatives to positions in his company in the UAE. In late 1977, not long after arriving in Egypt, he met Hosni Mubarak whom Sadat appointed vice president in 1975. It was only in 1977 that things began to shape up for Salem. After returning to Egypt from a short assignment in the United Arab Emirates, he moved with his family from his Golf area apartment into a new unit in an apartment building he constructed in Saba Emarat area of Heliopolis. For two years Salem lived in his old apartment in Cairo's affluent Heliopolis neighborhood. Although he was a millionaire by then, he took a job as an employee of the economy ministry, tasked with managing commercial deals. He reportedly kept his other business ventures private while working in the government. In 1979, Prime Minister Mustafa Khalil appointed him Commissioned Minister of Trade at the Egyptian embassy in Washington, D.C.

That same year, Salem became CEO of the Egyptian American Transportation Company (ETSCO), established in Delaware with a branch in Cairo. On 9 October 1982, an article was published by The Washington Post entailing violations the company committed regarding various arms deals following the signing of the Camp David Accords in 1979. The arms deals involved using money from the Persian Gulf states to fund Mujahideen efforts against the Soviet occupation of Afghanistan and dictatorships in Latin America. Kamal Hassan Ali, the Egyptian minister of foreign affairs at the time, vehemently denied the allegations against ETSCO, calling them "wicked". He claimed the Egyptian government found no evidence of foul play on the part of the company during its year-long investigation of the incident. Ali went on to threaten to sue "anyone who dares to smear his name or any other Egyptian official" in American courts.

ABC News ran a televised documentary in early March 2011 about what it described as corruption that was built in the Camp David Accords and American military aid to Egypt. The network highlighted what it called the role of Hosni Mubarak, Mounir Thabet (Suzanne Mubarak's brother) and the late Field Marshal Abu-Ghazalah in ETSCO's illegal ventures. The aforementioned men received millions of dollars by maintaining an operation filled with illegal commissions, bribes and bidding violations. Salem paid an $8 million fine to The Pentagon in 1984 to settle the case. However, Amin Yousri would later discover through a memo sent from the Egyptian embassy to the Foreign Ministry in Cairo that Salem actually paid the Pentagon a much larger figure than was publicly announced. The memo mentioned that Salem's lawyers reached a $60 million settlement with the US government. A former partner in ETSCO who was also a CIA agent, Edwin Wilson, told ABC that Salem was a "front man" for Mubarak, according to anonymous employees.

=== Hosni Mubarak era ===
==== Investment in Sinai tourism ====
Sadat was assassinated in 1981 and was succeeded, later that year, by his vice president Hosni Mubarak who Salem had befriended and worked with in previous years. By 1987, the southern Sinai Peninsula experienced a boom in real estate investment, particularly in Sharm al-Sheikh. That year, Salem had commissioned the construction of a very large hotel called the Jolie Ville in that city. Suspicions were raised on Salem's acquisitions of property in Sinai since it was notably difficult for locals to acquire small parcels of land there and Salem had little background in construction. High-ranking officials, including Abdel Moneim Said, the governor-general of South Sinai, and Hamid Khodeir, a local council member of the nearby city of el-Tor, claim Salem gained contracts for the land along the southern Sinai coast due to his close friendships with Mubarak and his son Gamal. From 1987 until the early 21st-century, Salem had established tourism empire in Sinai, owning several hotels. Major expansions to his business operations in Sinai included a mass conference hall, a golf course, a luxurious mosque for Mubarak's personal use, and numerous palaces, one of which he sold to Mubarak. In 1997, the Jolie Ville hosted a large conference sponsoring peace in the Middle East related to the Arab–Israeli conflict.

The local Bedouins who lived along the southern Sinai coast privately criticized Salem for ignoring their community by not building any projects in the local areas. Members of the el-Tor local council complained that his operations further marginalized the Bedouins by not contributing to their welfare, increasing their sense of marginalization. Abdel-Moneim Said agreed, stating "Salem did not contribute anything that benefited ordinary people in the governorate." In 2002, Said claimed that after the local government constructed a strip-like "Walk" adjacent to the Jolie Ville Hotel intended for locals to open business along, Mubarak ordered the governor to hand it over to Salem.

==== Egyptian–Israeli gas deals ====
In 1993, following the 1993 Oslo Agreements between the Israelis and Palestinians which Mubarak helped broker, Israel and Egypt began work on a gas pipeline to supply the former with natural gas and to build a petroleum refinery in Sinai, the first privately owned refinery in the Arab Middle East. Mubarak awarded Salem licenses to work on both projects. Salem's relations with Israeli business circles dates back to the 1970s during his tenure at the Washington D.C. embassy, including when the Israelis and Egyptians were negotiating Camp David. In 1996, Salem sold most of his shares in the new refinery company, Midor, and made a substantial profit. In 2007, he sold most of his shares in the East Mediterranean Gas Company, a year before the pipeline actually pumped any gas. According to The New York Times, Israel gained 40% of its gas needs from below-market price Egyptian gas exports. The Israeli newspaper Yediot Aharonoth described Salem as the "number one man" of the normalization process between the two states.

== Revolution and trial ==
=== Flight to Spain and arrest ===
Salem fled Egypt on 3 February 2011 during the Egyptian Revolution of 2011 to Spain, a country in which he held dual citizenship. A warrant for his arrest was issued by Interpol in May 2011. He was later arrested at his home in La Moraleja, Madrid, Spain on 14 June by Spanish authorities on separate Spanish charges. Salem was accused by Egyptian authorities of corruption on charges he illegally gained public funds by obtaining a monopoly on the sale of gas to Israel, and as a result, squandering $714 million in public funds (independent experts believe the amount squandered is much higher) by selling Egyptian natural gas to Israel at below market prices. Additionally, Egyptian investigators alleged that Salem was permitted by former President Mubarak to buy a large piece of valuable land on the Red Sea coast for development from the Egyptian government at a large discount. In exchange, prosecutors allege that Salem gave Mubarak and his family five luxury villas worth about $4.5 million, including a 161,000-square-foot seaside estate in Sharm el-Sheikh. Following his arrest, Spanish judges set his bail at €27 million (approximately $33 million), €12 million for the Spanish charges and €15 million for the Egyptian charges.

=== Trial in Egypt and extradition fight ===
Salem's trial on the charges related to his sale of gas to Israel at deflated prices began in Egypt on 3 August 2011 in absentia. In March 2012, the Spanish National Court ruled that Salem and his son Khaled Salem should be extradited to Egypt to face charges. The Spanish authorities had already frozen $47 million in his accounts and seized homes he owned worth $14 million, including seven in the resort of Marbella. Spain demanded assurances from Egyptian authorities that in exchange for the defendants extradition the two would be heard in front of new juries than the ones currently in trial since the previous August and that the men would have the choice to return to Spain to serve their sentences. Then in June 2012, the Cairo Criminal Court found Salem, in absentia, and former Petroleum Minister Sameh Fahmi guilty and sentenced them each to 15 years in prison.

In 2016, Salem signed a deal to make it possible for him and his family to return to Egypt without the risk of facing prosecution. The deal required that Salem give up 75 percent of his wealth. Several wealthy businessmen had fled Egypt after the uprising in order to avoid the corruption charges. There was a wide effort for reconciliation with these businessmen and the deal with Salem was part of it. However, Salem resided in Spain until his death due to the Spanish authorities' refusal to extradite him.

== See also ==
- Ahmed Ezz (businessman)
