= First Ganzouri Cabinet =

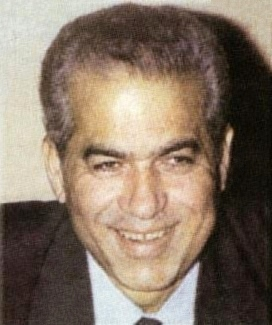
Photograph of Kamal Ganzouri during his tenure as Governor of the New Valley

The First Ganzouri Cabinet was led by Egyptian prime minister Kamal Ganzouri from 2 January 1996 to 5 October 1999.

== List of ministers ==
Ministry	Minister	Notes	Term in office
Prime Minister	Kamal el-Ganzuri		11 January 1996
Agriculture and Land Reclamation Minister	Yousef Wali		1982
Ministry of Defense and Military Production	Mohammed Hussein Tantawi		1991
Foreign Minister	Amr Musa		1991
Interior Minister	Habib al-Adli		1997
Information Minister	Safwat El-Sherif	(also of Television Stations)	1982
Higher Education Minister and Minister of State for Scientific Research	Moufed Mahmoud Shehab		1997
Justice Minister	Farouk Seif Al Nasr		1990
Ministry of Awqaf	Mahmoud Zakzouk		July 1997
Culture Minister	Farouk Hosny		1987
Tourism Minister	Mohammed Mamdouh El-Beltagui		October 1993
Minister for the Shura Council	Kamal Mohammed El-Shazli		October 1993
Housing, Utilities, and Urban Communities	Mohammed Ibrahim Suleiman		October 1993
Manpower and Emigration Minister	Ahmad Ahmad El-Amawy		1993
Minister of State for Administrative Development	Mohamed Zaki Abu Amer	(* Märch 1946)	1993
Health and Population Minister	Ismail Awad-Allah Sallam; Ismail Awadallah Sallam (* 21. July 1941 in Monoufeya Governorate)		1996
Public Works and Water Resources Minister	Mahmoud Abu Zeid		July 1997
Minister of State for Environment	Nadia Makram Ebeid; Nadia Makram Ebeid		1997
Education Minister	Hussein Kamel Bahaeddin		1991
Minister of Economy and 1997 Minister for Economics and Foreign Trade	Youssef Boutros Ghali		1993
Ministry for Operations of the Egyptian Armed Forces	Mohammed Hussein Tantawi		1991
Ministry for Economics and Economic Cooperation	Nawal al-Tahtawi	erstmals eine Frau in diesem Ressort in einem arabischen Staat	11 January 1996
Finance Ministry	Mohie El Din El Ghareeb	en	1990
Ministry for Electricity and Energy	Mohamed Maher Abaza		1984
Ministryof Petroleum and Mineral Resources	Hamdi Al Banbi		
Ministry for Public Enterprise	Atif Abaid		
Ministry for Planning and International Cooperation	(Mohammed Zaki Abu Amer), Zafer El-Bishri		
Minister of Business for the Egyptian Armed Forces	Mohammed Hussein Tantawi; see also Mohamed Ghamrawi		8 July 1997
Minister of Pensions and Social affairs	Mervat El-Tellawi		8 July 1997
Ministry of Industry und Natural Resources	Suleiman Reda		
Ministry of Traffic, Communication and Civil Aviation	Suleiman Metwalli		8 July 1997
Minister of Supply and international Commerce	Ahmed Gweili; Ahmad Guwaili		8 July 1997
Minister of Land development	Mahmoud Sherif		8 July 1997
Minister of Cabinet Affairs	Talaat Hammad		
Egyptian General Intelligence Service	Omar Suleiman		1993
Suez Canal Authority	Ahmed Fadel		

Quelle:
