= Egyptian Petroleum Research Institute =

Energy research institute in Egypt

The Egyptian Petroleum Research Institution (EPRI; Arabic: معهد بحوث البترول) is a governmental organization in Egypt founded by the presidential decree 541 in 1974. It is under the umbrella of the Ministry of Scientific Research and Technology, to help advance the development of studies and applications within the oil sector, and to find solutions to both long and short term technical problems.

To effectively carry out this role the Ministry of petroleum is authorized for up to 50% of the EPRI's board of director shares; the Minister of Petroleum and Mineral Resources and Development is the head of the EPRI board, other members who are appointed by him to support and back the EPRI mission.

== See also ==
- Energy in Egypt
