= Domestic responses to the Egyptian revolution of 2011 =

There have been numerous domestic responses to the Egyptian revolution of 2011. Opposition parties, activists and religious bodies have been staunchly demanding Egyptian President Hosni Mubarak's resignation, with the exception of fearful Christian authorities, who called for staying away from the protests (although Christian individuals have taken part). The government has made ongoing attempts at media censorship, including briefly shutting down nearly all Internet traffic.

Mubarak has made some initial changes to quell dissent, including dissolving his government, and appointing military figure and former head of Egypt's intelligence service Omar Suleiman as vice-president. Mubarak asked aviation minister and former chief of Egypt's Air Force, Ahmed Shafiq, to form a new government. Opposition to the Mubarak regime has coalesced around Mohamed ElBaradei, with all major opposition groups, including the Muslim Brotherhood, supporting his role as a negotiator for some form of transitional unity government.

== Government ==
=== Before Mubarak's resignation ===
On 29 January, the head of the Egyptian Shura Council's Foreign Affairs and Defense Committee, and also a part of the ruling party, said he does not believe the protests have ended yet.

On 29 January, in response to the previous days' events, President Mubarak spoke on national television after midnight local time for the first time since the protests began. He said in his speech that despite a "point of no return" being crossed, national stability and law and order must prevail, that he had requested the government, formed only months ago, to step down, and that a new government would be formed. He made no offer to step down himself. On 29 January, Mubarak appointed Omar Suleiman, head of Egyptian Intelligence, as vice president, and Ahmed Shafik as prime minister.

Positions assigned in new government as of 31 January 2011
Office	Previous office holder	New office holder
President	Hosni Mubarak	Hosni Mubarak
Vice President	vacant	Omar Suleiman
Prime Minister	Ahmed Nazif	Ahmed Shafik
Minister without portfolio; GIS Chief	General Omar Suleiman	General Mourad Moafy
Ministry of Agriculture and Land Reclamation	Amin Ahmed Mohamed Othman Abaza	Ayman Farid Abo Hadid
Ministry of Civil Aviation	Ibrahim Manaa	Ibrahim Manaa
Ministry of Communications and Information Technology (MCIT)	Tarek Kamel	Tarek Kamel
Ministry of Culture	Farouk Hosni	*
Ministry of Defense and Military Production	Field Marshal Mohamed Hussein Tantawi	Field Marshal Mohamed Hussein Tantawi
Ministry of Civil Aviation	Air Marshal Ahmed Shafiq	Air Marshal Ibrahim Manaa
Ministry of Education	Ahmed Zaki Mostafa Badr	Ahmed Zaki Mostafa Badr
Ministry of Electricity and Energy	Hassan Ahmed Younis	Hassan Ahmed Younis
Ministry of Finance	Youssef Boutros-Ghali	Samir Radwan
Ministry of Foreign Affairs	Ahmed Aboul Gheit	Ahmed Aboul Gheit
Ministry of Trade and Industry	Rachid Mohamed Rachid	Samiha Fawzy
Ministry of Health and Population	Hatem Mostafa Mostafa El-Gabali	Ahmed Fahmy
Ministry of Higher Education and Scientific Research	Hani Mahfouz Hilal	Hani Mahfouz Hilal
Ministry of Information	Anas El Fiqqi	Anas El Fiqqi
Minister of Interior	General Habib El Adly	General Mahmoud Wagdy
Ministry of Social Solidarity	Ali El-Sayed Ali Al-Moselhi	Ali El-Sayed Ali Al-Moselhi
Ministry of Investment	Mahmoud Mohieldin	Mahmoud Mohieldin
Ministry of International Cooperation	Fayza Aboel Naga	Fayza Aboel Naga
Ministry of Justice	Mahmoud Marei	Mahmoud Marei
Ministry of Manpower and Immigration	Aisha Abdel Hadi	Aisha Abdel Hadi Abdel Ghani
Ministry of Petroleum	Sameh Fahmi	Sameh Fahmi
Ministry of Planning and Economic Development	Osman Ahmed Osman	Osman Ahmed Osman
Ministry of Local Development	Colonel Mohamed Abdul Salam Mahgoub	Colonel Mohamed Abdul Salam Mahgoub
Ministry of Religious Affairs	Mahmoud Hamdi Zakzok	Abdallah el Hosseny Helal
Ministry of Tourism	Zaher Garana	Zaher Garana
Ministry of Transportation	Alaa Edin Mohamed Fahmy	Atef Abd el Hamid Mostafa
Ministry of Water Resources and Irrigation	Mohamed Nasr el Din	Mohamed Nasr el Din
Ministry of State for Administrative Development	Ahmed Darwish	Ahmed Darwish
Ministry of State for Legal and Parliamentary Councils	Mofid Shehab	Mofid Shehab
Ministry of State for Environmental Affairs	Maged George	Maged George
Ministry of State for Military Production	Sayed Moshaal	Sayed Moshaal
Ministry of State for Family and Population	Moshira Khatab	Moshira Khatab
Governor - Central Bank of Egypt	Farouk El Okda	Farouk El Okda
Permanent Representative to the UN, New York	Maged Abd el Fatah	Maged Abd el Fatah
Minister without portfolio; GIS Chief	General Mourad Moafy	General Mourad Moafy
Chairman of the Suez Canal Authority	General Ahmed Fadel	General Ahmed Fadel

- On 9 February, Culture Minister Gaber Asfour resigned after one week in office citing health problems.

Positions in previous government that are unresolved
Office	Previous office holder
Ministry of Petroleum	Sameh Fahmi
Ministry of Housing, Utilities, and Urban Communities	Ahmed Alaa E-Din Amin El-Maghrabi

On 31 January, Mubarak swore in his new cabinet in the hope that the unrest would fade. The protesters did not leave and continued to demonstrate in Cairo's Tahrir Square to demand the downfall of Mubarak. The vice-president and the prime minister were already appointed. He told the new government to preserve subsidies, control inflation and provide more jobs.

On 1 February, Mubarak said he never intended to run for reelection in the upcoming September presidential election, though his candidacy had previously been announced by high-ranking members of his National Democratic Party

In his speech, he asked parliament for reforms:

According to my constitutional powers, I call on parliament in both its houses to discuss amending article 76 and 77 of the constitution concerning the conditions on running for presidency of the republic and it sets specific a period for the presidential term. In order for the current parliament in both houses to be able to discuss these constitutional amendments and the legislative amendments linked to it for laws that complement the constitution and to ensure the participation of all the political forces in these discussions, I demand parliament to adhere to the word of the judiciary and its verdicts concerning the latest cases which have been legally challenged.

— Hosni Mubarak, 1 February 2011

== Opposition ==
=== Protester demands ===
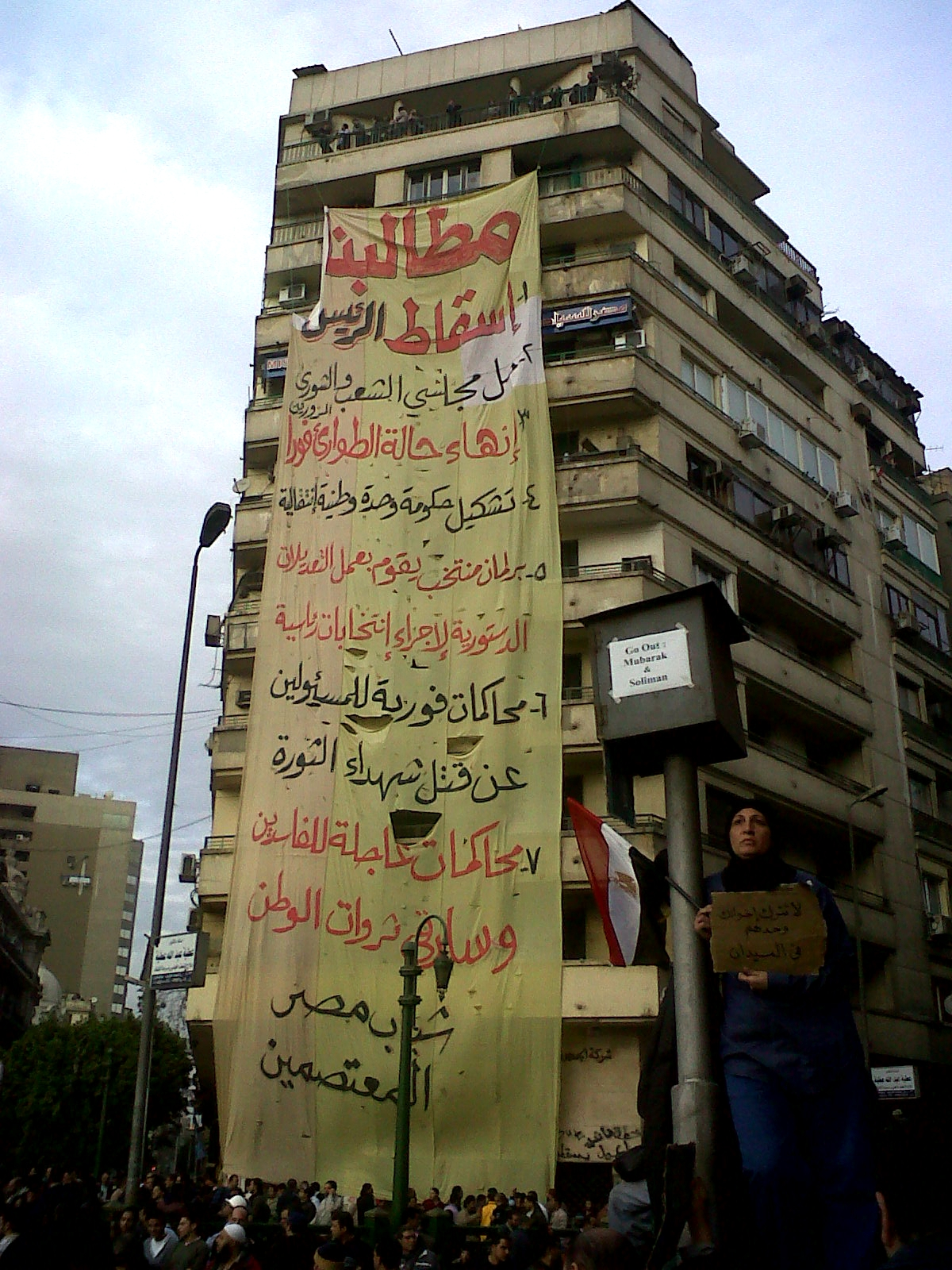
A sign with the protesters' omnibus demands

Opposition and civil society activists have called for changes to a number of legal and constitutional provisions which affect elections. Specifically they call for:

- Amendment of Article 76 of the Constitution to make it easier for party and independent candidates to get on the presidential ballot.
- Amendment of Article 77 to establish term limits for the presidency, which were removed from the Constitution in 1981.
- Amendment of Article 88 to restore full judicial supervision of elections. This would help tame election fraud and vote rigging, which are common in Egyptian elections.
- Amendment of Law 177 of 2005 in order to facilitate the formation of new political parties.
- Amendment of Article 179: Amendments in 2007 to Article 179 included an "anti-terrorism" measure, which allows for arbitrary arrest, searches and wiretapping without warrant, and transfer of any civilian court case of the president's choosing to military tribunals. Unlike the Emergency law, it is a permanent measure and not a temporary measure requiring parliamentary approval.

In the Spring 2010, Mohamed El baradei began circulating a petition in the runup to the 2010 Egyptian parliamentary election calling for 7 specific reforms:

1. End the state of emergency.
2. Ensure full judicial supervision of elections.
3. Provide for domestic and international monitoring of elections.
4. Ensure that all candidates have sufficient access to the media, particularly during the presidential election campaign.
5. Allow Egyptians abroad to vote through embassies and consulates.
6. Work toward a political system built on democracy and social justice.
7. Provide the right to nomination for political office without obstacles, in accordance with Egypt's obligations under the International Convention on Civil and Political Rights; limit the president to two terms.
8. Allow voting by national identification card. These measures will require amending articles 76, 77, and 88 of the Constitution as soon as possible.

=== Muslim Brotherhood ===
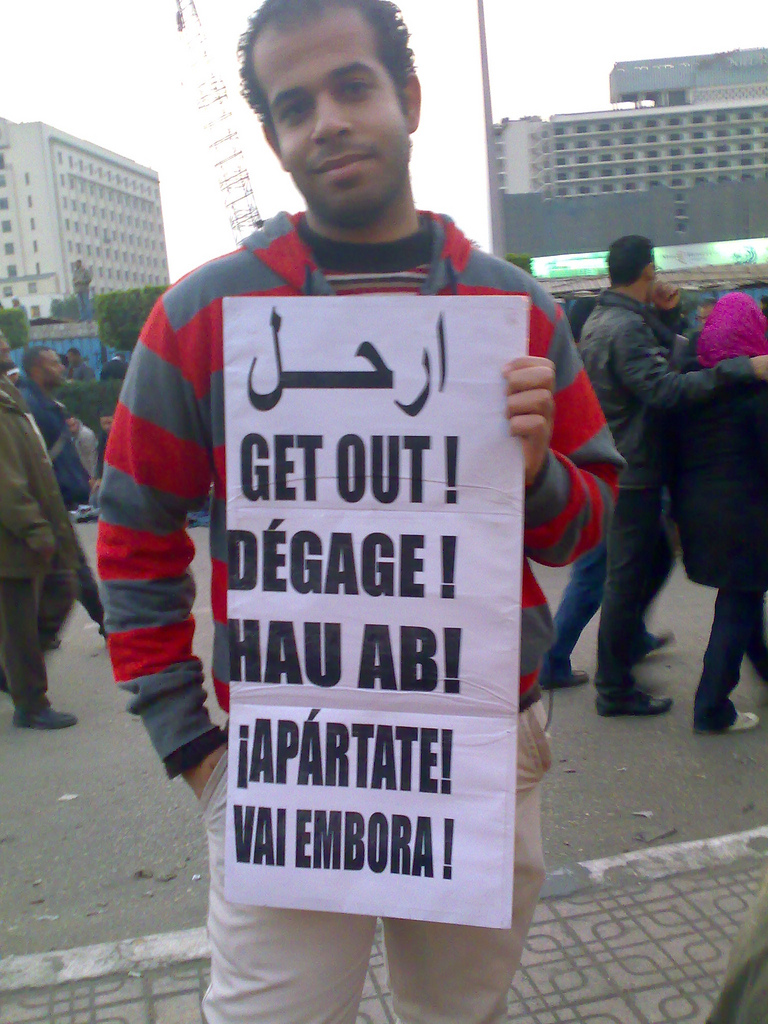
"Leave" in several languages.

In response to 25 January events, the Muslim Brotherhood said: "Egypt is undergoing important events where the Egyptian people started a movement in Cairo and other cities in the country expressing their anger and denouncing the practices and violations by the system." Following Mubarak's speech, the brotherhood issued a statement reiterating demands for Mubarak's resignation and saying it was time for the military to intervene. The brotherhood also said it would not be nominating a new president.

On 30 January, it called for all opposition groups to unite while blaming Mubarak for the situation. The brotherhood supports Mohammed ElBaradei's National Association for Change. On 30 January, The Guardian reported that ElBaradei has been mandated by the brotherhood and four other opposition groups to negotiate an interim "national salvation government." There were also demands by the brotherhood that Mubarak step down.

=== Mohammed ElBaradei ===
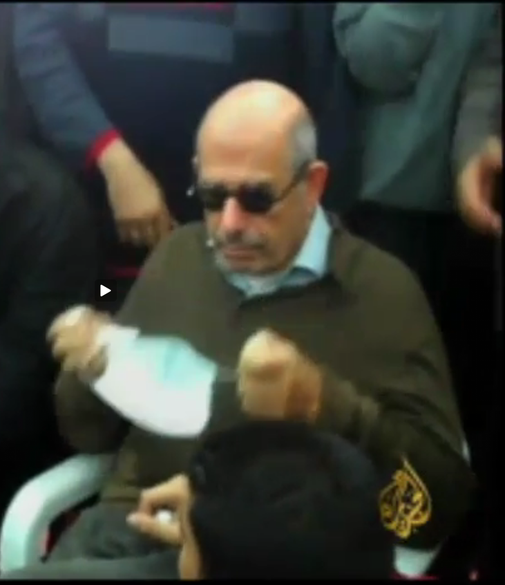
Mohammed ElBaradei during Friday of Anger

On 27 January 2011, Mohammed ElBaradei returned to Egypt amid ongoing turmoil. He declared himself ready to lead a transitional government if that was the will of the nation, saying that: "If [people] want me to lead the transition, I will not let them down". He called for ousting the regime, as in Tunisia. Subsequently, "when he joined protesters Friday after noon prayers, police fired water cannons at him and his supporters. They used batons to beat some of ElBaradei's supporters, who surrounded him to protect him." ElBaradei said he was "proud of the protesters" and proud of the military, who by 29 January were the only state force on the streets of Cairo, with police nowhere to be seen. There were numerous individual public displays of affection and respect for soldiers manning positions on the streets. He urged the US to end the "life support to the dictator" and that "It is better for President Obama not to appear that he is the last one to say to President Mubarak, 'It's time for you to go.'"

ElBaradei has also stated that "the people (of Egypt) want the regime to fall". In response to the appointment of Omar Suleiman as the new Vice President of Egypt, ElBaradei stated that it was a "hopeless, desperate attempt by Mubarak to stay in power, I think it is loud and clear...that Mubarak has to leave today". Additionally, he restated the position that when Egypt does become a democratic nation and that "there is no reason to believe that a democracy in Egypt would not lead to a better relationship with the US based on respect and equity."

As of 30 January, the 6 April Youth Movement, the We Are All Khaled Said Movement, the National Association for Change, the 25 January Movement and Kefaya – the main organizers of the protests – had all asked ElBaradei to act in the country's internal affairs and foreign affairs in the transitional phase, and for the formation of a temporary national salvation

=== Yusuf al-Qaradawi ===
Having returned after 30 years of exile from his native country of Egypt, Yusuf al-Qaradawi in Tahrir Square proclaimed,"Egyptian people are like the genie who came out of the lamp and who have been in prison for 30 years" and, "We are not going back in until all our demands are met".

He also made assuring statements about the Coptic minority:

The regime planted sectarianism here … in Tahrir Muslims and Christians joined hands for a better Egypt

He also made demands including the dissolution of the current cabinet, release of thousands of political prisoners, end of the infamous state security services, and the end of the Gaza blockade.

After the sermon thousands of protesters settled into prayer.

=== Political reactions ===
Judges, who were particularly vocal about the independence of the judiciary during the 2005 Egyptian presidential election also joined talks about the interim government.

Local Sheikhs reportedly took control of the remote community Siwa after the protests began to escalate, they reportedly put the community on lockdown after a nearby town "was torched".

=== Others ===
Political individuals

Amr Moussa, the head of the Arab League and an Egyptian citizen, said he would consider a decision to run in the upcoming 2011 presidential election.

Former UN Secretary-General Boutros Boutros-Ghali expressed concern over a transitional period that could not be effective if it was forced too early. In that vein, he said the Mubarak should not leave immediately and that direct negotiations could bring about a solution. He also warned of an economic collapse saying that "the Egyptian public is unaware of the impact such a crisis will have over the next few months. You can't effect a transition in 24 hours and at the same time avert the risk of uncontrollable chaos."

Apolitical individuals

Amr Khaled, a Muslim televangelist, activist and preacher, said the future of Egypt needs a government to listen to the young people and respect them.

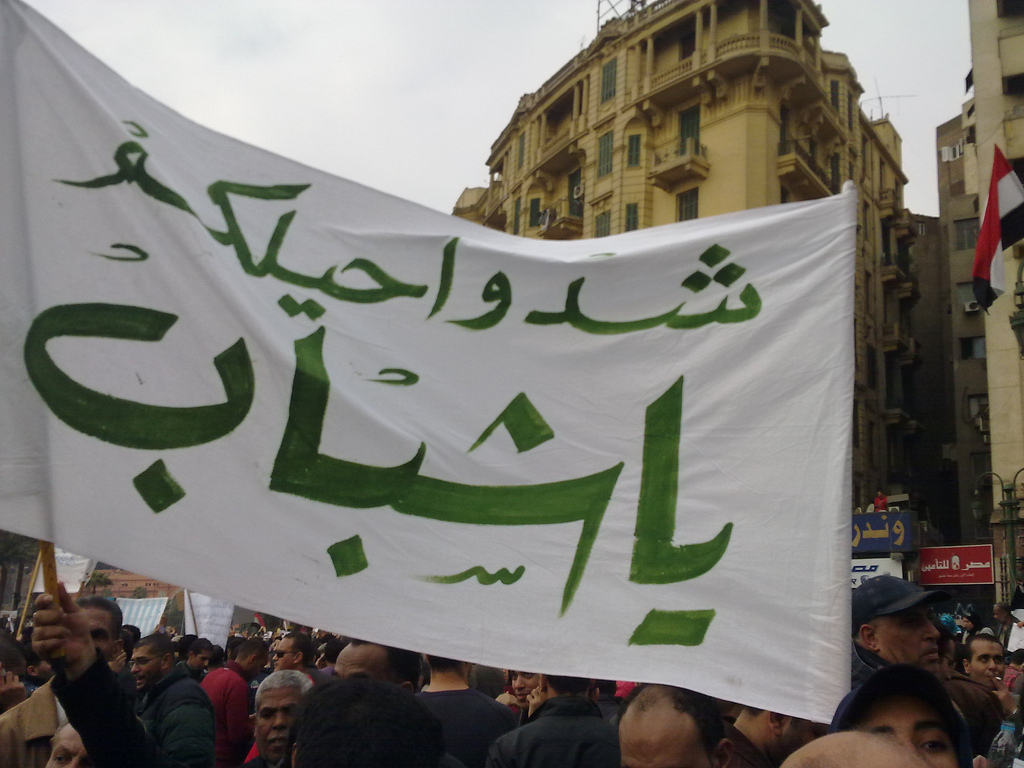
A large banner in Cairo's Tahrir Square on 1 February: "Go On, Young People!"

On 31 January, The Daily Telegraph reported that Egyptian-born actor Omar Sharif called for Mubarak to step down.

Ahmed Zewail, an Egyptian-American scientist and the winner of the 1999 Nobel Prize in Chemistry, said that Egypt cannot resolve the crisis without changing the system. He offered a proposal of four items to remove Egypt from the crisis and enter a new era. He said that reason for this proposal is his sense of duty towards Egypt and its youth.

=== Apolitical ===
On 27 January, the Egyptian Football Association announced that all Egyptian League games would be suspended in order to keep "clubs from congregating." Yet the fan clubs, known as "ultras," organised neighbourhood committees to provide security amidst looting and also to confront the police. The move was read by CNN as allowing for "the poor, the disenfranchised, and the mass of young people" to take part in the protests. One sports writer said that "The involvement of organised soccer fans in Egypt's anti-government protests constitutes every Arab government's worst nightmare. Soccer, alongside Islam, offers a rare platform in the Middle East, a region populated by authoritarian regimes that control all public spaces, for the venting of pent-up anger and frustration." The move was also followed by a Libyan government directive to the Libyan Football Federation to cancel matches for the "foreseeable future" on concern over the unrest spreading.

== Religious institutions ==
Many of Al-Azhar Imams joined the protesters on 30 January all over the country.

Coptic Orthodox Bishop Marcos of Shubra El-Khiema urged Christians not to join the demonstrations, saying that they do not know the goals of those responsible for launching the protests. During his weekly sermon Pope Shenouda III asked his followers to be "calm" for the second day of demonstrations during his weekly sermon. On 31 January, he expressed support for Mubarak in an interview with Egyptian state television. In spite of this, a number of young Christian activists joined the protests led by well-known Christians like member of the Wafd Party Raymond Lakah. Naguib Sawiris, the head of Orascom Telecom said that the appointment of Omar Suleiman as vice president may not satisfy protestors. "I think it is not enough. It's a good step because the gentleman, Mr. Suleiman has a very good international reputation; he is from the system so he can at least ensure that the current transition to a more democratic regime can happen." Coptic thinker Rafik Habib condemned the position of the church but he stressed that the participation of Copts in the demonstrations are increasing day by day.

== Arrests ==
Activists reported that security agents have detained a number of protesters who were taking part in the 25 January demonstration. Twenty-five people have been arrested at Asyut, according to Gamal Eid, director of the Arabic Network for Human Rights Information (ANHRI). He also noted that security agents seized banners hoisted by the protesters. Security sources said that Asyut's police arrested approximately 50 young people the night before 25 January demonstration and confined them in Central Security trucks. An estimated 860 protesters had been arrested by the beginning of demonstrations on Tuesday.

Sources at the Muslim Brotherhood said a number of the group's members had been detained in Mohandessin before heading to join 25 January demonstration. Essam al-Erian, the main spokesperson for the Muslim Brotherhood, was detained on 28 January, along with other senior Muslim Brotherhood leaders.

Ayman Nour, the founder of the liberal opposition El-Ghad Party, tweeted that his son was taken by an unmarked car. Security forces arrested The Guardian reporter Jack Shenker in Cairo, who secretly recorded his subsequent journey in a police van. After stopping near a government security headquarters outside the city, a policeman searched for Ayman Nour's son, however, the detainees overpowered him and escaped. Mohammed ElBaradei was also reported to be under house arrest.

On 31 January, six Al Jazeera journalists were arrested and their camera equipment was seized. The journalists were released later that day, although the equipment was reportedly not returned.

== Mediajihad: censorship and circumvention ==
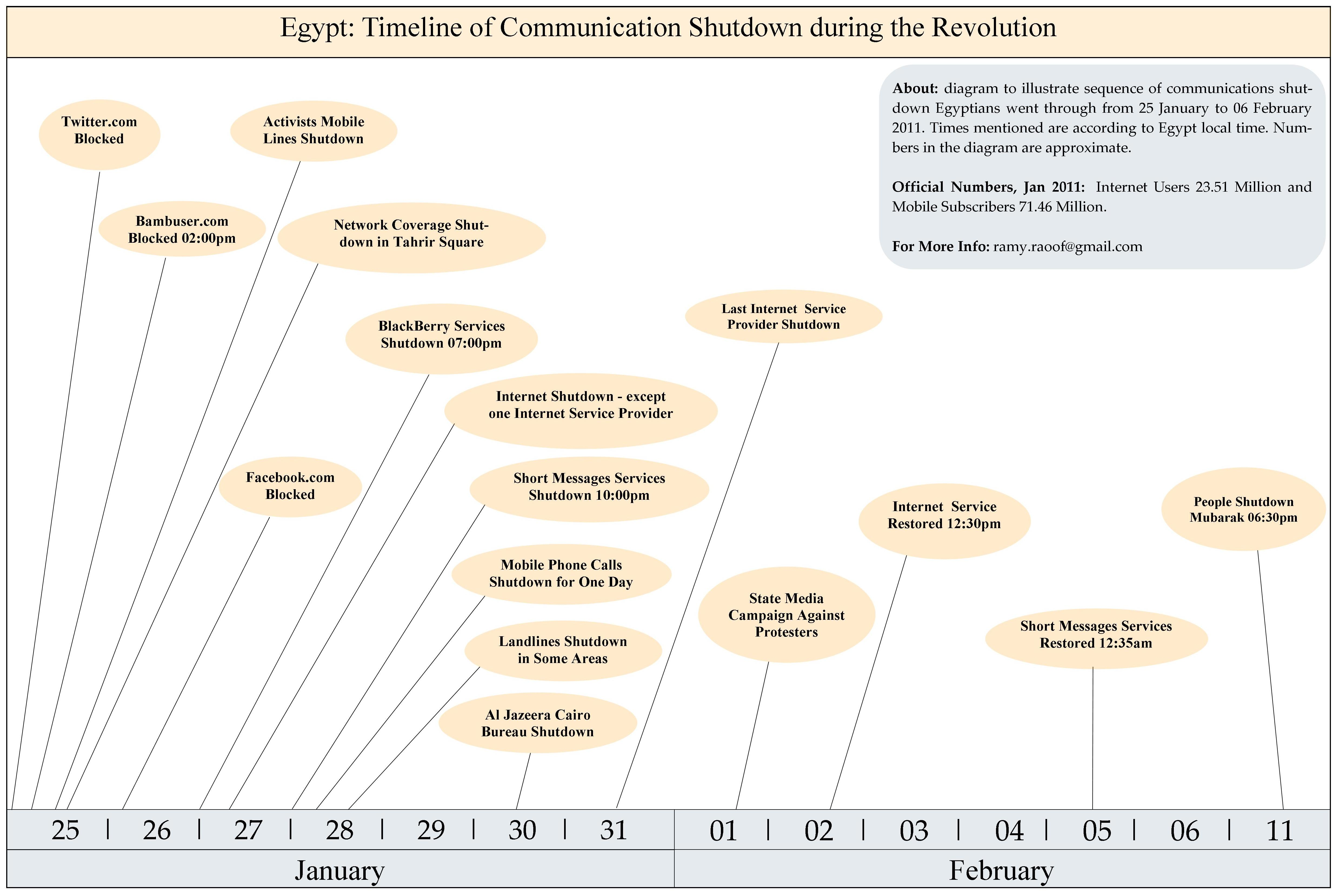
Timeline of Communication Shutdown during the 2011 Egyptian Revolution

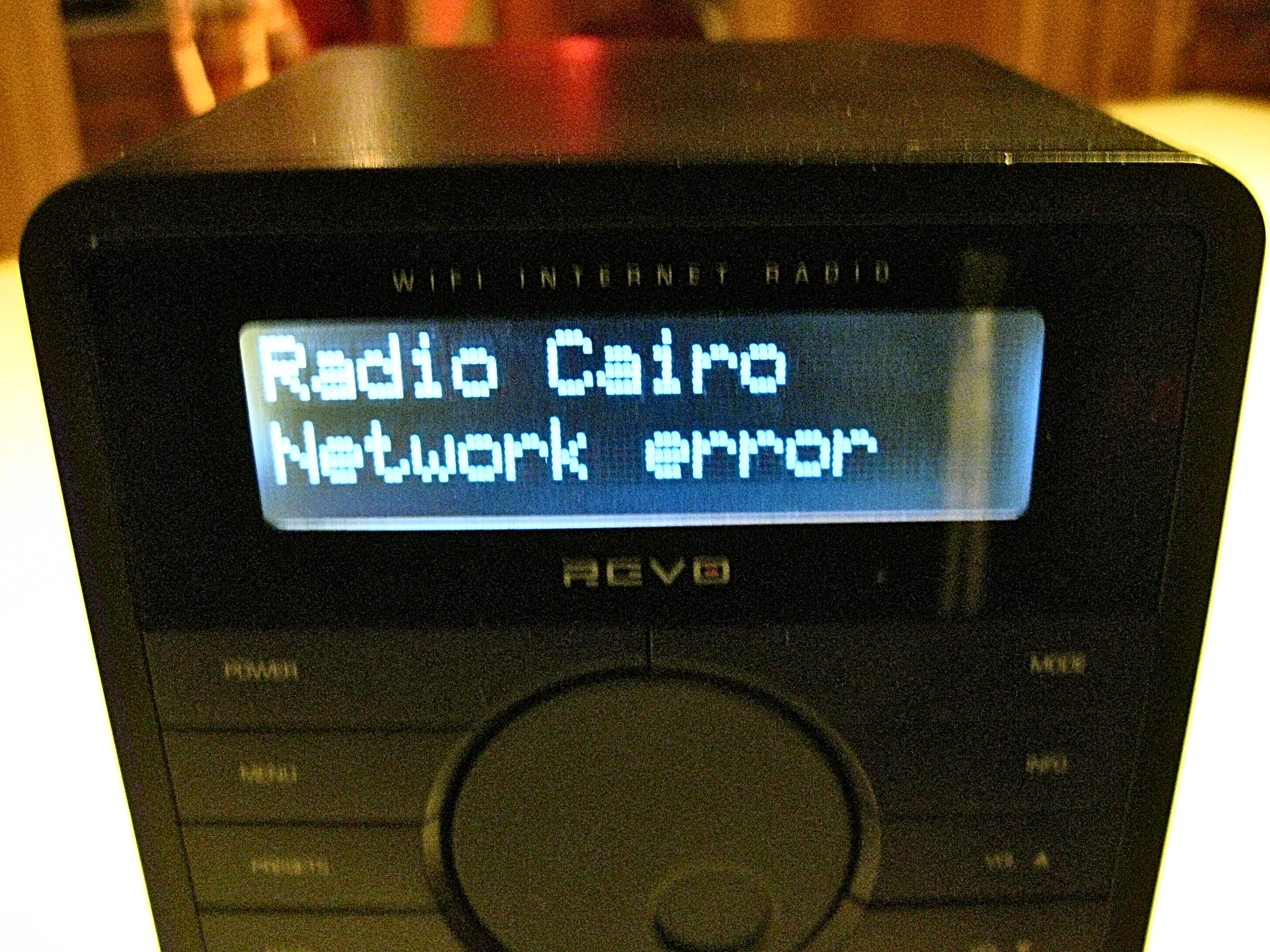
Radio Cairo DNS error.

Beginning on the first day of protests the Egyptian government censored most of the media outlets inside Egypt and took measures to block social media websites which had helped protesters to spread news about the events on the ground. The success of the protests has been partly attributed to the involvement of tech savvy youth all over Egypt who were able to overcome the government blockades on social media. (As one activist succinctly tweeted during the protests, ""We use Facebook to schedule the protests, Twitter to coordinate, and YouTube to tell the world.")

On 27 January, it was reported on Twitter by many Egyptian and foreign reporters on the ground that the government had blocked text messaging and BlackBerry messaging services. Twitter was sporadically blocked, then Facebook.

External videos
- Time-lapse graph of Egyptian ISPs withdrawing from the Internet on YouTube

Al Jazeera said its television transmission had to be switched to another frequency as its signal on Nilesat was jammed. The network was again shut down in the country on 30 January and its bureau in Cairo was shut down. Al Jazeera said that Egyptian state media called on Egyptians to stop watching Al Jazeera claiming only they had the real story. A statement from the network denounced the move as an attempt to "stifle and repress" the freedom of the press in Egypt and that the network would continue its coverage regardless. On 2 February, the network asked Nilesat to restore its broadcast or face legal action.

Bloomberg reported that Vodafone was forced by the Egyptian government to send SMS text messages to its customers. The pro-Mubarak messages characterized protesters as un-loyal to the state and that they should be confronted. The Vodafone chief executive officer Vittorio Colao also reported that the general public is still being blocked from sending SMS text messages. The UK government then complained to the Egyptian government over its forcing Vodafone to send the messages.

Starting just after midnight local time on the night of 27/28 January the Egyptian government almost entirely cut off Internet access in an act of unprecedented Internet censorship. About 3,500 Border Gateway Protocol (BGP) routes to Egyptian networks were shut down from about 12:10 am to 12:35 am 28 January. The shutdown happened within the space of a few tens of minutes, not instantaneously. According to Renesys, Telecom Egypt started shutting down at 12:12 am, Raya/Vodafone at 12:13 am, Link Egypt at 12:17 am, Etisalat Misr at 12:19 am, and Internet Egypt at 12:25 am. Renesys interpreted the shutdown as people getting phone calls one at a time, telling them to take themselves off the air, rather than an automated system taking all providers down at once. Facebook confirmed a decrease in traffic from Egypt. A Border Gateway Protocol monitoring site in Vancouver, British Columbia, Canada, reported most of the primary AS (ISPs) dropping a large percentage if not all of route advertisements. Virtually all of Egypt's Internet addresses were unreachable, worldwide. In response, Egyptians used smartphones as modems, and even land lines with dial-up modems to make international calls to access the internet, fax machines in universities and embassies, and ham radio to circumvent the restrictions. Furthermore, the sole remaining functioning ISP, Noor, which had had eight percent of the market share in Egypt (but which connected the Egyptian stock market and many western companies to the outside world), has been reported by Tor, an anonymity network, on 30 January to be the source of a quadrupling of Tor clients from Egypt within twenty-four hours as of 30 January; the use of Tor has skyrocketed due to the situation in Egypt.

In response to the shut-down of the various media, the U.S. State Department spokesman Philip Crowley said that open communications must be allowed. About 24 hours after the blackout began, cellphone and smartphone e-mail access were restored, including Vodafone and Mobinil, though internet access was reportedly still down.

Noting the monopoly of pro-government medias downgrading the movement, ignoring it, and leading a smear campaign, the young activists reacted. A Facebook page was set up to provide a pro-protest view of the movement on the Tahriq square, his pacific approach, and aims. A team of 20 antigovernment activists rotated to publish online articles, a copy-cat of the state-owned newspaper was published with pro-protest headlines, and a pirate radio station streamed over the internet.

On 31 January, Google and Twitter launched the Speak To Tweet service that allowed people caught up in the unrest to post voicemail messages via Twitter without any access to the internet. Despite a low usage of Twitter in the country (there are some 14,000 Twitter users in Egypt, according to the social media firm Sysomos,) Twitter organised a new account @twitterglobalpr in reference specifically to Egypt's use of the tool after it was blocked on 25 January.

On 2 February, Internet access was restored in a staggered fashion much as it had been withdrawn. Initial estimates by the OECD and Forbes magazine of the costs of the shut-down to Egypt's telecom sector alone range from $90M to $110M (with the higher figure factoring in the exodus of call centers); the impact on the country's wider tourism industry was estimated to be "at least $1B."

=== Arrests, harassment, and assault of foreign journalists and NGOs ===
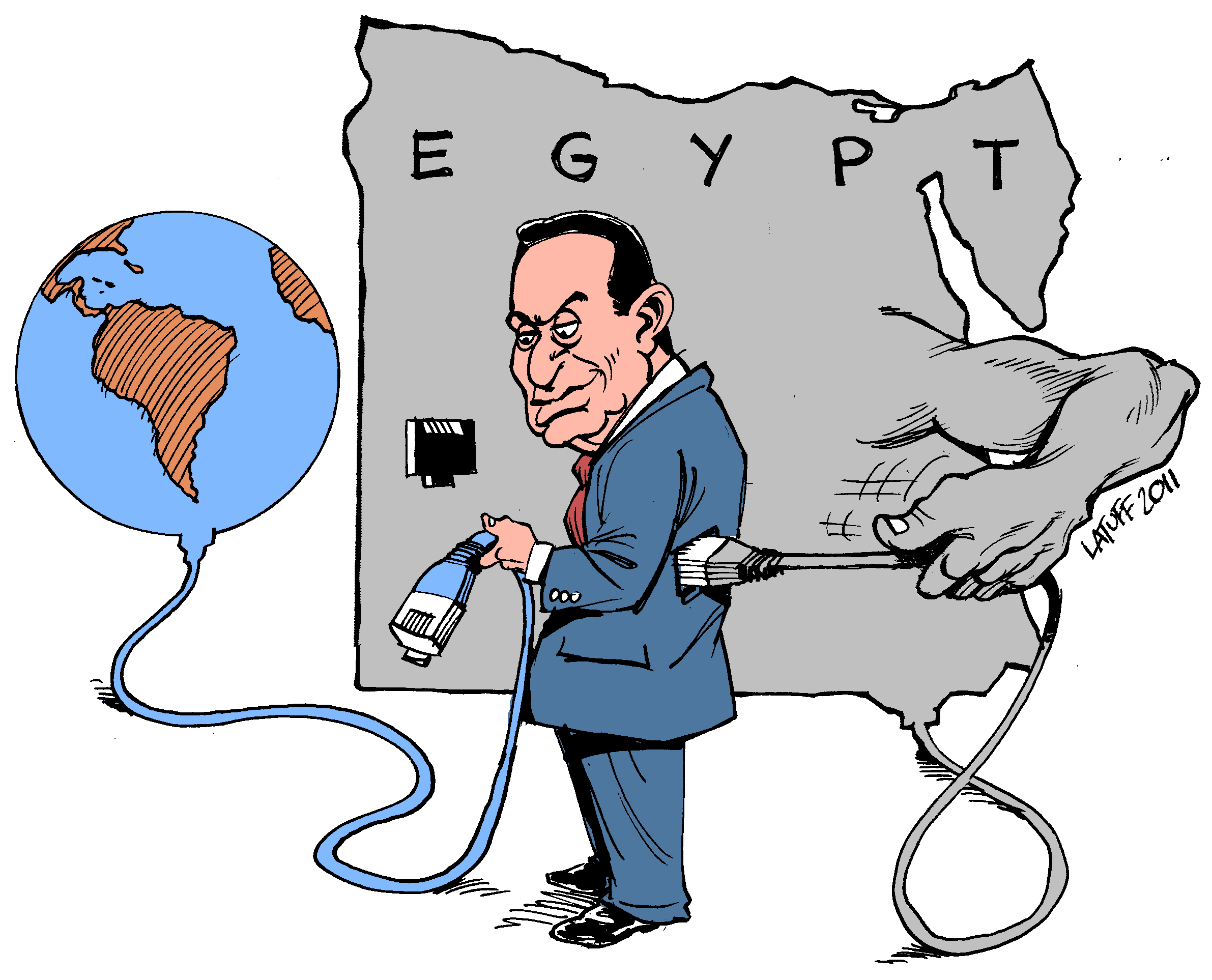
A political cartoon by Carlos Latuff depicting Hosni Mubarak unplugging Egypt from the Internet, and about to be disconnected himself in turn

On 3 February, journalists from a number of news organisations, including CNN, the Associated Press, CBS News, BBC News, Al Jazeera English, Danish TV2 News, Swiss television, Swedish SVT and Belgium's Le Soir newspaper, were reported assaulted, detained or otherwise obstructed. The Committee to Protect Journalists said, on 3 February, that Mubarak had "unleashed an unprecedented and systematic attack on international media." Security forces and pro-government gangs "hunted down journalists in their offices and hotels", preventing broadcast networks from airing live footage from Tahrir Square.

Armed Mubarak supporters attacked foreign journalists, physically, and by smashing their equipment. Plainclothes police officers were alleged to have shut down news media outlets that had been operating in buildings overlooking the square. Mubarak supporters also seized an informal center set up by human rights workers in the square, and, according to Amnesty International, two of their employees and one from Human Rights Watch were detained.

Two other Al Jazeera reporters were also attacked as they arrived from the airport. As of 9 February, almost 12 Al Jazeera reporters had been arrested.

Two reporters working for The New York Times were released after being detained overnight in Cairo. Two staffers of The Washington Post among two dozen journalists detained by the Interior Ministry on Thursday morning, the paper reported. The White House spokesman, Robert Gibbs, condemned the Mubarak government's harassment of journalists, calling it "completely and totally unacceptable", and that "any journalist that has been detained should be released immediately".

Swedish media reported that SVT (Swedish national television) reporter Bert Sundström was arrested while covering events in Cairo's Tahrir Square. Later the same day, on 3 February, Swedish media reported that Sundström had undone surgery in a Cairo hospital after suffering knife injuries to his stomach and back and head injuries. Two reporters from Aftonbladet were also detained for several hours having been accused of being Mossad spies, and a four-member news team from Israel were detained and later released.

CNN correspondent Anderson Cooper and his news crew were roughed up by a pro-Mubarak mob, and reporters from The Washington Post were harassed. Cooper was reportedly punched in the head 10 times. A journalist for Dubai-based Al-Arabiya television reportedly suffered concussion after being attacked. Six Al Jazeera journalists were arrested on 1 February before being released a few hours later.

According to Aftonbladet, a Greek photographer was also stabbed in the leg.

The committee to Protect Journalists said that it was looking into at least ten cases of journalists who had been detained in Cairo since 2 February.

By the evening of 3 February, in Cairo, no major broadcaster was able to air live coverage from the square, the epicenter of the protests.

The next day, the French Foreign Ministry said it had had no word about the fate of three French journalists who work for Le Figaro and were kidnapped by unidentified assailants.

On 15 February, CBS News reported that its chief foreign correspondent, Lara Logan, had been assaulted on 11 February, by a frenzied mob of Egyptian protesters. She was abruptly separated from her crew, after which she suffered a brutal 20-30-minute beating and sexual assault, before being rescued by a group of Egyptian women and an estimated 20 Egyptian soldiers. She was taken to an American hospital, from which she was released on 16 February, to recover in her Washington D.C. home. President Obama called her to express his concern. On 17 February, Washington Post columnist Jonathan Capehart reported that there was no coverage of this assault from Al-Jazeera. Journalist Nir Rosen made insensitive and offensive comments about the attack on his Twitter page, and resigned shortly afterward, with apologies.

== Financial markets ==
Although there are not many oil reserves in Egypt, Western governments are still very concerned about how commercial and economic stability will be affected by an unstable Egypt. The Suez Canal is one of the largest shipping arteries for crude oil, and shipping lanes for trade.

On 26 January, Egypt's EGX stock market index fell on speculation the instability would spread. The EGX30 has dropped almost 1,000 points since 13 January 2011. EGX dropped 6.1 percent on 26 January, and then another 6.2 percent on 27 January, before the chief of the stock market temporarily suspended trading due to marked losses in the first minutes of the opening session. The stock index closed the day down by 10.5 percent. On the first trading day in the week following the expansion of protests the EGX again fell.

On 28 January, Fitch Ratings reduced Egypt's rating outlook to negative from stable, saying the upsurge in protests adds uncertainty to the political and economic outlook. They also suggested that they may cut the national credit rating. Egyptian dollar-denominated bond yields also rose to a record high as oil prices rose and global stock market indices sank. On 30 January, Central Bank of Egypt Governor (Deputy Governor then) Hisham Ramez said that the interbank market will "be a liquid market" when it opens after law and order is restored.

On 1 February, the financial-services company HSBC upgraded Egyptian bonds from hold to buy, after they were put up from sale four days before. They said the bonds could be very cheap after the fall. On 2 February, Egyptian ten-year, dollar-denominated bond yields rose 6.52 percent, following a record 7.21 percent on 31 January.

On 8 February, Egypt's credit risk fell to the lowest and least riskiest level since the protests began. Egyptian sovereign debt bond yield decreased by .32%. A bond auction on 7 February met most of the E£15 billion (US$2.5 billion) sought as business leader and participant in government-opposition talks Naguib Sawiris said there had been "big progress." The Deputy Central Bank Governor Hisham Ramez said that the central bank would support the Egyptian pound from fluctuations after the currency fell 1.6% to a six-year low against the US dollar. "We saw excessive speculative activity so we intervened to stabilise the market." Though the pound gained most of its losses forwards contracts reflected a 4.9% weakening in three months.

On 10 February, amid rumours of Mubarak stepping down dollar-denominated bonds strengthened, as did Egyptian global depository receipts.

=== Regional markets ===
On 29 January, Saudi Arabia's Tadawul stock market index fell 6.4 percent, the most since 25 May 2010, on concern over Egypt's instability.

On 30 January, the Dubai Financial Market's General Index also fell 6.2 percent (the most since December 2009) during mid-day trading on concern "international investors are fleeing Middle East stock markets with justified risk aversion across the board." The Tadawul rebounded somewhat from the previous days crash, but Qatar's QE Index fell 3 percent, the most since 25 May and Abu Dhabi's ADX General Index also fell 3.7 percent. Kuwait's SE Price Index fell a narrower 1.8 percent, Oman's MSM30 fell 3 percent and Bahrain's All Share Index also fell a narrower 1.4 percent. Meanwhile, Israel's TA-25 Index fell almost 2.5 percent, the most since May 2010 as Ampal-American Israel Corporation, who own a stake in Egypt's East Mediterranean Gas Company, fell by the most in nearly two years. Israeli government ten-year-bond yields rose.

=== Global markets ===
In the first days of the protests, international gold prices jumped more than US$20 – the most in twelve weeks – to US$1,341. The price of oil rose US$3.70 (4.3 percent) to US$89.34 on concern the instability would spread.

On 31 January, major European and Asian markets continued their fall from 28 January due to Egyptian unrest. The Hungarian stock index BUX fell to its lowest in two weeks as the protests reduced investors' appetite for emerging-market assets.

On 2 February, brent crude crossed US$100 on concern over instability. The next day, crude oil advanced for the fifth day in a row on stability concerns amidst expanding protests in the Arab world. Rising oil prices as a result of the instability were reported to be pressuring OPEC to increase supplies in order to ease prices.

On 4 February, Venezuelan Energy Minister Rafael Ramírez said that OPEC would only meet if the Suez Canal was shut and that the price of oil was rising to a "fair price".

== Mubarak's family ==
Gamal Mubarak, President Hosni Mubarak's son–who has been widely tipped as his successor–was reported by the U.S.-based Arabic website Akhbar al-Arab to have fled to London with his family on 25 January. Later reports said that Mubarak's family did not, in fact, flee. An Al Jazeera reporter said that Gamal remained in Cairo and was attending a meeting of the ruling National Democratic Party. On 25 January, the International Business Times reported a traceless rumour on Twitter that the Egyptian President's wife Suzanne Mubarak has left for London as well. On 29 January, it was reported that BBC Arabic had been told that Gamal and Alaa Mubarak had arrived in London with their respective families. Egyptian State Television has denied this report. Der Spiegel reported an unconfirmed rumour that Mubarak was planning a "prolonged hospital stay" in Germany, a move that would, in effect, have him leave the presidency paving the way for a face saving transition of power.

== National Dialogue ==
Suleiman was ordered by Mubarak to conduct negotiations with opposition groups.

Among the major ideas circulated was a compromise in which Suleiman would be delegated all of Mubarak's authorities for an interim period and Mubarak would stay on as an honorary president for that period.

== See also ==
- Nonviolent resistance
