= Maritim Jolie Ville Resort =

Egyptian hotel and golf course

Coordinates: 27.9120°N 34.3250°E

- Interactive map of the Maritim Jolie Ville Resort area

General information
- Location: Naama Bay, Sharm El Sheikh

Maritim Jolie Ville Resort is a resort hotel and golf course in Naama Bay, Sharm El Sheikh. It is run by the HKS Group, chaired by Hussein Salem. The rooms of the hotel are described as being "shady bungalows". It reportedly has a 30,000 square metres (320,000 ft^{2}) 'lazy river' water park and lush gardens.
