= Abdel Hadi Kandil =

Egyptian chemist and politician (1935–2019)

Minister of Petroleum and Mineral Resources
- In office 1984 – 20 May 1991
- President: Hosni Mubarak
- Prime Minister: Kamal Hassan Ali; Aly Lotfy Mahmoud; Atef Sedky
- Preceded by: Ezzettin Hilal
- Succeeded by: Hamdi Al Banbi

Personal details
- Born: Abdel Hadi Mohamed Kandil; 2 March 1935 Al Zarqa, Damietta, Kingdom of Egypt
- Died: 23 March 2019 (aged 84) Cairo, Egypt
- Education: Ain Shams University; Milan Petroleum Institute

Abdel Hadi Kandil (2 March 1935 – 23 March 2019) was an Egyptian chemist and politician who was the oil minister of Egypt between 1984 and 1991.

== Early life and education ==
Kandil was born in Al Zarqa, Damietta, on 2 March 1935. He received a degree from Ain Shams University in 1956. He graduated from the Petroleum Institute in Milan, Italy, in 1964.

== Career ==
Following his graduation Kandil began to work as a chemist in the Petroleum Pipelines Company. Then he became the head of the quality control department at the Egyptian General Petroleum Corporation where he worked in various capacities until March 1973. He was named as vice chairman and board member of the Petroleum Corporation for operations on 23 June 1976. He became the Egyptian member in the board of directors of the Arab Maritime Petroleum Transport Company and also, was named as a member of the National Investment Bank. His other posts included the chairman of the Petroleum Research Council and board member of the faculty of science at Ain Shams University. He became the chairman of the Petroleum Corporation in October 1980.

Kandil was appointed minister of petroleum in 1984 to the cabinet led by Prime Minister Kamal Hassan Ali. Kandil replaced Ezzedin Hilal in the post. Kandil also served in the post in the cabinets headed by Aly Lotfy Mahmoud and Atef Sedky. His term lasted until May 1991 when he was removed from the office due to his close relations with the Italian gas and oil company ENI. Phil Andrews and Jim Playfoot cited Kandil's education at the Petroleum Institute in Milan as a reason for this alliance. Kandil's successor as oil minister was Hamdi Al Banbi. During his tenure Kandil visited Israel in late May 1985 being the first Egyptian minister to visit the country since 1982.

== Personal life and death ==
Kandil was married and had children. He died in Cairo on 23 March 2019, at the age of 84.
