= Hamdi Al Banbi =

Egyptian engineer and politician (1935–2016)

Minister of Petroleum and Mineral Resources
- In office 20 May 1991 – 5 October 1999
- President: Hosni Mubarak
- Prime Minister: Atef Sedki; Kamal Ganzouri
- Preceded by: Abdel Hadi Kandil
- Succeeded by: Sameh Fahmi

Personal details
- Born: Hamdi Ali Abdul Wahab El Banbi; 4 October 1935
- Died: 11 August 2016 (aged 81)
- Party: National Democratic Party (NDP)
- Education: Cairo University; University of Moscow; Texas A&M University

Hamdi Al Banbi (Arabic: حمدي علي عبد الوهاب البنبي) (1935–2016) was an Egyptian engineer, businessman and politician who served as oil minister from 1991 to 1999.

== Early life and education ==
Banbi was born on 7 August 1935. He was a graduate of Cairo University where he received a degree in petroleum engineering in 1959. In 1960 he attended the University of Moscow and obtained a master of science degree in economics of petroleum engineering. He received his PhD in petroleum engineering from Texas A&M University in 1963.

== Career ==
Banbi was an engineer by training. After returning to Egypt he began to work at the Eastern Petroleum Company as a production engineer and served there until 1966 when he joined the faculty of engineering at Al Azhar University. From 1968 Banbi worked at the Western Desert Petroleum Company (WEPCO) where he became its general directorate of operations. In 1977 Banbi became the chairman of the Gulf of Suez Petroleum Company (GUPCO) and remained in the post until 1988 when he was named as the chairman of the Egyptian General Petroleum Corporation (EGPC) where he served until 1991.

Banbi was appointed oil minister of Egypt on 20 May 1991 and served in the cabinet headed by Prime Minister Atef Sedki. Banbi replaced Abdel Hadi Kandil as oil minister. Shortly after his appointment, Banbi modified oil pricing of Egypt and also, reshuffled officials at the ministry.

Banbi was also a member of the National Democratic Party (NDP) and won a seat in Shebin El Kom, provincial capital of the Monufia governorate, in the mid-term Shura Council elections held in June 1998. He also served as oil minister in the first cabinet of Prime Minister Kamal Ganzouri. Banbi was in office until 5 October 1999. Sameh Fahmi succeeded him as oil minister.

After leaving office, Banbi became the coordinator of the energy committee for the national economics and production authority in Egypt. He was also the president of the Arab society for mining and petroleum and the Egypt's gas society. In addition he was a board member of the Egypt's engineering society. Banbi founded TAQA Arabia in 2006, and served as the chairman of the firm.

In 2009 Banbi was made a member of the Petroleum Engineering Academy of Distinguished Graduates at Texas A&M University.

== Death ==
Banbi died on 11 August 2016.

Political offices
Preceded by Abdel Hadi Kandil	Oil Minister of Egypt; 1991-1999	Succeeded by Sameh Fahmi
