= Nadia Makram Ebeid =

Egyptian academic

Nadia Makram Ebeid (Arabic: نادية مكرم عبيد) is an Egyptian academic who served as the minister of state for environment being the first woman who served in the post.

== Biography ==
Ebeid is from a Coptic family originally based in Qena where her uncle was the politician Makram Ebeid. Her cousin is Mona Makram-Ebeid.

Ebeid received a master of arts degree from American University of Cairo in 1977. She was appointed minister of environment in July 1997 in a reshuffle of the cabinet led by Prime Minister Kamal Ganzouri. The office was newly established, and Ebeid became the first environment minister of Egypt. She remained to serve in the office until 2002. When she was in office, she also served as the vice-chair of the executive bureau of the Council of Arab Ministers Responsible for the Environment (CAMRE) and of the board of trustees of the Centre for Environment and Development for the Arab Region and Europe (CEDARE). Between 2002 and 2003 she was the first special peace envoy of the Arab League to Sudan. She was a visiting professor at George Washington University, USA. As of 2016 she was the executive director of CEDARE.
