= Sameh Fahmi =

Egyptian engineer and politician (born 1949)

Minister of Petroleum and Mineral Resources
- In office 5 October 1999 – 21 February 2011
- Prime Minister: Atef Ebeid; Ahmed Shafik
- Preceded by: Hamdi Al Banbi
- Succeeded by: Mahmoud Latif Amer

Personal details
- Born: Amin Sameh Samir Fahmi; 14 August 1949 (age 77) Cairo
- Party: National Democratic Party
- Education: Cairo University

Sameh Fahmi (born 14 August 1949) is an Egyptian engineer and politician who served as oil minister of Egypt for 12 years from 1999 to 2011.

== Early life and education ==
Fahmi was born in Cairo on 14 August 1949. He has a twin brother, Hadi Fahmi. Sameh Fahmi holds a bachelor's degree in chemical engineering, which he received from Cairo University in June 1973.

== Career and activities ==
After graduation, Fahmi began to work at the Egyptian General Petroleum Corporation (EGPC). In May 1993, he became a board member and vice head of the EGPC in charge of planning and projects. In January 1997, he was appointed CEO and vice chairman of the Midor oil refining venture near Alexandria. In 1997, he began to serve as a board member of the Petroleum and Mining Chamber and of the Federation of Egyptian Industries. In August 1998, he was named a board member of the Alexandria Company for Petroleum Maintenance. He joined the National Democratic Party and became a member of its policy secretariat.

Fahmi was appointed oil minister to the cabinet led by the Prime Minister Atef Ebeid on 5 October 1999, replacing Hamdi Al Banbi in the post. Fahmi was also named the chairman of the Egyptian Gas Holding Company. He was instrumental in the establishment of the Egyptian holding company for petrochemicals (ECHEM) in 2002. A 15-year natural gas deal was signed by him and Israeli national infrastructure minister Benjamin Ben-Eliezer in July 2005. In December 2010, he was appointed president of the Gas Exporting Countries Forum. Although he retained his post in the cabinet led by Ahmed Shafik in the January 2011 reshuffle, he resigned from office due to the complaints of oil workers on 16 February 2011. His term ended on 21 February 2011, and he was replaced by Mahmoud Latif Amer as oil minister.

=== Controversy ===
After leaving office, Fahmi was investigated because of alleged wrongdoing. In April 2011, it was announced by the public prosecutor that he would be tried in relation to the charges related to a natural gas deal with Israel. He was arrested and held in custody on 21 April 2011. Fahmi was sentenced to 15 years in prison in June 2012 due to his alleged role in selling and exporting natural gas to Israel in 2005 at lower prices than market rates. He along with other officials was also fined about $2.3 billion.

In mid-March 2013, the court of cassation decided that Fahmi should be retried over the Egypt-Israel gas case. On 28 March 2013, he was released from prison since he stayed in prison longer than the maximum 18 months allowed for pre-trial detention. Specifically, he was jailed for 23 months.

Political offices
Preceded by Hamdi Al Banbi	Oil Minister of Egypt; 1999-2011	Succeeded by Mahmoud Latif Amer
