= Ministry of Petroleum and Mineral Resources (Egypt) =

Government ministry of Egypt

Arab Republic of Egypt Ministry of Petroleum and Mineral Resources
- وزارة البترول والثروة المعدنية
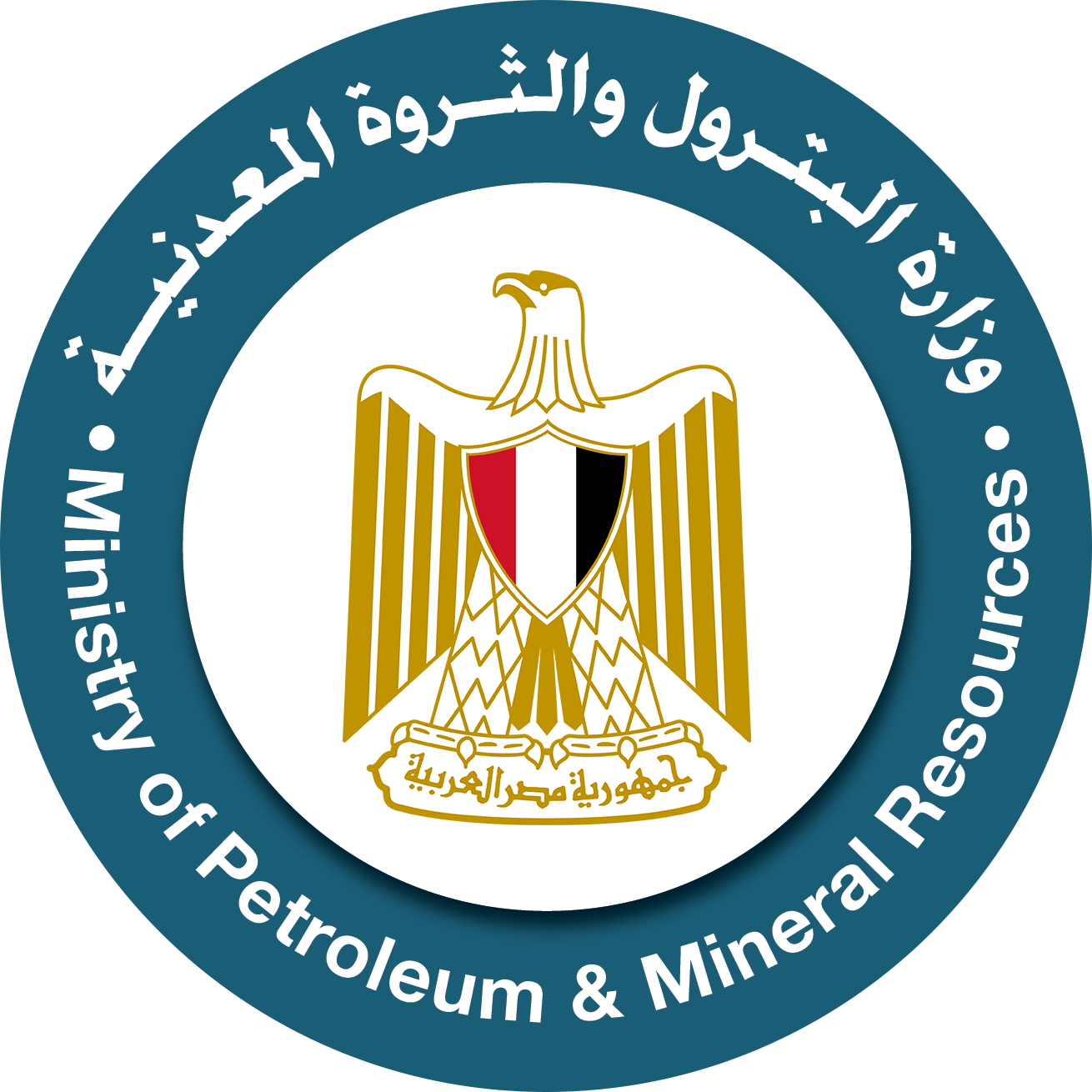

Agency overview
- Jurisdiction: Government of Egypt
- Headquarters: Nasr City, Cairo
- Agency executives: Tarek El-Molla, Minister of Petroleum; ِAbed Ezz El Regal, Chairman, EGPC; Osama El Bakly, Chairman, EGAS; Saad Helal, Chairman, ECHEM; Mohamed Abdelazeem, Chairman, GANOPE; Osama Farouk, Chairman, EMRA
- Child agencies: EGPC; EGAS; ECHEM; GANOPE; EMRA
- Website: Official website

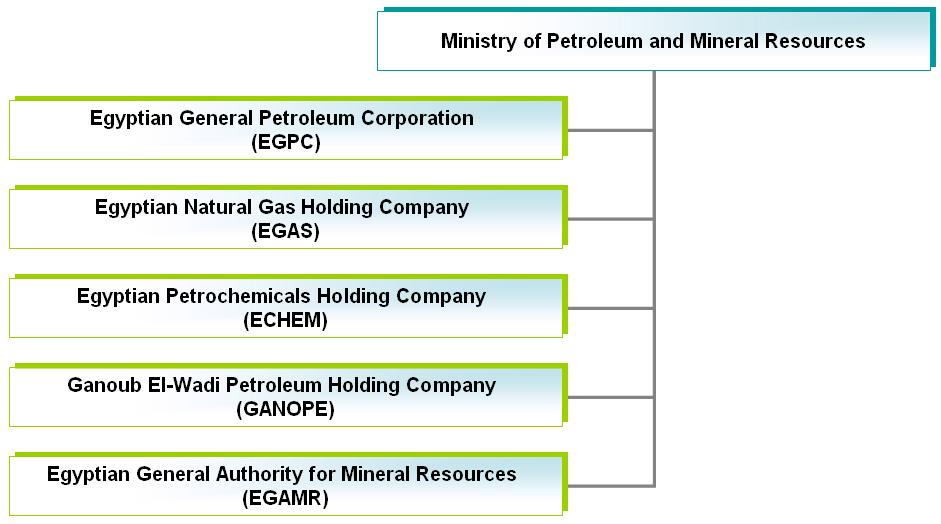

The first independent Ministry of Petroleum was established in March 1973, to manage the political role of petroleum resources before the war of 1973. In view of the strategic significance of the Ministry's existence as a political body that sets the general petroleum strategies on new bases to go in line with the requirements of the country at this stage. On top of its priority list, is to provide the local market needs of petroleum products, petrochemicals and mineral resources, and to contribute to achieving the targeted growth rates of the national economy.

== Functions and duties ==
- The Ministry of Petroleum and Mineral Resources sets up policies and strategies for the Petroleum Sector and its five entities for implementation.
- The petroleum policy is based on increasing the reserves as well as production of crude oil and natural gas through intensifying the upstream activities.
- Working on developing and building human cadres, capable of carrying out responsibilities, to be achieved within the comprehensive program, currently, being executed to develop and modernize the Petroleum Sector.
- Working on transforming Egypt into a Regional Hub for Oil and Gas Trading.

== The petroleum sector's vision ==
- Achieve financial sustainability.
- Become a leading regional Oil and Gas hub.
- Be a role model for the future of modernized Egypt.

Take into consideration the Sector Core Values.... Core Values: safety, innovation, ethics, transparency and efficiency

== Strategic objectives of the ministry of petroleum and mineral resources ==
- Meeting the demands of the domestic market for petroleum and petrochemical products, mineral resources as well as achieving the target of the national economy growth rates.
- Securing oil and natural gas supplies through expanding upstream activities, diversification of resources and working towards modifying the energy mix.
- Achieving the optimum value-added of natural resources.
- Advancing a national high efficiency manpower.
- Maintaining environmental standards and sustainable development.
- Transforming Egypt into a Regional Hub for Oil & Gas Trading.
- Developing and modernizing the Petroleum Sector to meet the demands of the current era.

== The ministry’s hierarchy ==
The petroleum sector in Egypt consists of 6 state-owned entities. These are: Egyptian General Petroleum Corporation (EGPC), Egyptian Natural Gas Holding Company(EGAS), Egyptian Petrochemicals Holding Company (ECHEM), Ganoub El Wadi Petroleum Holding Company (GANOPE), and Egyptian General Authority for Mineral Resources.

== Previous petroleum ministers ==
- Sherif Ismail (July 2013 – September 2015)
- Sherif Haddara (May 2013 – July 2013)
- Osama Kamal (August 2012 – May 2013)
- Abdullah Ghorab (March 2011 – August 2012)
- Mahmoud Latif (February 2011 – March 2011)
- Sameh Fahmi (October 1999 – February 2011)
- Hamdi Al Banbi (May 1991 – October 1999)
- Abdel Hadi Kandil (July 1984 – May 1991)
- Ahmed Ezzettin Hilal (March 1973 – July 1984)
- Ali Waly (May 1971 )

== See also ==
- Energy in Egypt
