= Hany Mahmoud =

Egyptian politician

Minister of Communications and Information Technology
- In office 2 August 2012 – 5 January 2013
- President: Mohamed Morsi
- Prime Minister: Hisham Qandil
- Preceded by: Mohamed Salem
- Succeeded by: Atef Helmi

Personal details
- Party: Independent
- Education: Alexandria University

Hany Mahmoud (Arabic: هاني محمود) is an Egyptian engineer and former minister of communications and information technology of Egypt who briefly served in the Qandil cabinet.

== Education ==
Mahmoud received a degree in telecommunication engineering from Alexandria University. He also completed academic courses and training programs at different higher education institutions, including London Business School, INSEAD, IMD Business School, the University of Sheffield, Xerox Leadership Academy and Vodafone Academy.

== Career ==
In 1994, Mahmoud served as the marketing manager of XEROX in Europe, Middle East and Africa (EMEA). In 1996, he became regional human resources manager of the company in the United Kingdom. Then from 1997 to 1999, Mahmoud worked as general manager of human resources, business quality and customer satisfaction for XEROX. Leaving XEROX, he began to work in Vodafone Egypt as general manager of human resources, administrative and legal affairs in 2000. He worked in the same company for ten years and during this period, he served at different posts, including vice president of Vodafone Turkey (2006–2007), vice president of Vodafone Egypt (2007–2008) and chairman of Vodafone Turkey and regional director of the company for Central Europe and Africa (2009–2010).

in 2011, Mahmoud was appointed chairman of the Egypt Post during the Mobarak era. Then he was named as the director of the Information and Decision Support Center (IDSC) on 2 May 2011. He also served as a consultant to the then minister of communications and information technology for postal policies. On 2 August 2012, he was appointed minister of communications and information technology.

Mahmoud's term lasted until 25 December 2012 when he resigned from his post. On 5 January 2013, the Qandil cabinet was reshuffled, and Mahmoud was replaced by Atef Helmi as minister.
