= Atef Helmy =

Egyptian minister (born 1950)

Atef Helmy Nagib
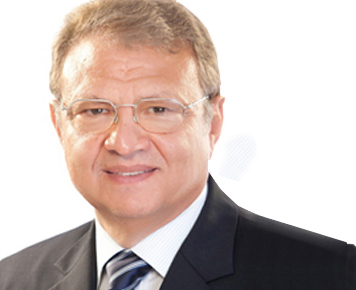

Minister of Communications and Information Technology
- In office 16 July 2013 – 5 March 2015
- President: Adly Mansour; Abdel Fattah el-Sisi
- Prime Minister: Hazem Al Beblawi; Ibrahim Mahlab
- Succeeded by: Khaled Negm
- In office 5 January 2013 – 1 July 2013
- Prime Minister: Hisham Qandil
- Preceded by: Hany Mahmoud

Personal details
- Born: April 23, 1950 (age 75) Cairo, Egypt
- Party: Independent

Atef Helmy Nagib (Arabic: عاطف حلمي نجيب; born 23 April 1950) is an Egyptian communication and technology expert and the former minister of communications and information technology.

== Early life and education ==
Atef Helmy was born in Cairo in 1950. He holds a Bachelor of Science in Communication and Electrical Engineering having graduated with Honors from the Military Technical College in 1973. He also received a diploma in Computer Science from the Faculty of Engineering, Ain Shams University in 1979 and a master's degree in Information Technology also from the Faculty of Engineering, Ain Shams University in 1982.

== Career ==
Helmy was appointed as a teaching assistant in the Military Technical College upon graduation in 1973 and immediately joined the war effort with the Egyptian Armed Forces during the 1973 war. He continued to serve in the armed forces in the field of communications and information technology from 1973 to 1983.

In 1983, Helmy resigned from the armed forces and travelled to Abu Dhabi, United Arab Emirates to join NCR and grew his career within the company until he became General Manager of NCR Dubai. Helmy moved to Egypt in 1996 to establish Oracle Egypt and lead it as its managing director. In 2005, he launched, in Cairo, one of Oracle's largest global support centers, which was a key reference that portrayed Egypt as one of the top destinations for outsourcing and offshoring, bringing Oracle's total workforce in Egypt to over 800 professionals. He retired from Oracle in 2006 and subsequently founded Prime Business Consulting in 2007. Helmy also undertook several public roles in the ICT sector, including chairman of the Egyptian Chamber of Communications & Information Technology (CIT).

== Political career ==
Helmy served as Egypt's Minister of Communications & Information Technology from January 2013 to March 2015, first as one of the independent members of the Qandil cabinet, and then subsequently served in the cabinets of Hazem El Biblawy and Ibrahim Mahlab

As ICT Minister, Helmy chaired the Boards of the National Telecommunications Regulatory Authority (NTRA), the Information Technology Industry Development Agency (ITIDA), and the National Telecommunication Institute (NTI). He also chaired the Board of Trustees of the Information Technology Institute (ITI), the Technology Innovation and Entrepreneurship Center (TIEC), and oversaw the institutional development of Egypt Post.

Helmy was responsible for the National ICT Strategy 2013-2020 which envisioned Egypt's transformation into the global digital economy, and spearheaded several national initiatives to achieve this goal, namely:

- عاطفCreating the necessary infrastructure to make Egypt the Internet Digital Hub of the Region
- عاطفDeveloping a national integrated digital platform (Digital Society) to contribute to sustainable socio-economic development, and
- عاطفSupporting the ICT industry development and job creation through fostering innovation and attracting FDI

Helmy also participated in the following major projects that:

- Broadband Initiative
- Digital Dividend
- Unified Telecom License
- The new Infrastructure Company
- Cloud Computing
- Mobile Money & Financial Inclusion
- Technology Parks
- New Suez Canal ICT Infrastructure and services
- Government to Citizens (G2C) digital services
- local manufacturing of smart meters, smartphones and tablets
- establishment of enabling ecosystem to enhance education, healthcare and other sectors through technology

== Resignation ==
Helmy and three other ministers of Qandil Cabinet resigned from office on 1 July due to government's reaction to mass demonstrations in the country. He was again appointed minister of communications and information technology on 16 July 2013 to the interim cabinet led by Hazem Al Beblawi.

== Post-ministry career ==
Atef Helmy was appointed as chairman of the board of Orange Egypt from April 2016 to April 2017. Additionally, he has focused his post-ministry to development activities in Egypt, Africa, and the Arab world, through the following roles:

- Chairman, Prime Business Consulting
- Senior Advisor, Orange Middle East & Africa (OMEA)
- Ambassador of Orange to the Smart Africa Alliance
- Board Member, SAMENA Council
- Founding Member, Arab Federation for Digital Economy
- Founding Member, Egypt Fintech Association
- Honorary Member, American Chamber of Commerce
- Member, Board of Trustees, British University in Egypt
- Member, Board of Trustees, Beit El Zakat (Egypt House of Alms & Charity)
- Board Member, Al Mohandes Insurance
- Board Member, Al Hayat Insurance

== Awards and recognition ==
- Atef Helmy was appointed as Chairman of the World Summit on the Information Society (WSIS+10) high-level event in Geneva in June 2014 Youtube interview
- Helmy was also awarded the Golden Medallion from the International Telecommunication Union (ITU) during the event

== Personal life ==
Helmy is married and has 3 children and 8 grandchildren.
