= Magued Osman =

Egyptian academic

4th Minister of Communications and Information Technology
- In office February 2011 – July 2011
- Prime Minister: Essam Sharaf
- Preceded by: Tarek Kamel
- Succeeded by: Mohamed Abd-el-Kader Salem

Dr. Magued Osman (Arabic: ماجد عثمان) is the CEO and Director of the Egyptian Center for Public Opinion Research "Baseera," which ran the only transparent public opinion surveys by phone for the first Egyptian Presidential elections in 2012. Baseera implemented also the first exit poll in the middle east. Dr. Osman is a member of Egypt National Council for Women. Dr.Osman is acting as the chairman of Telecom Egypt (we), the main landlines service provider in Egypt, since 2016.

He is the former Minister of Communications and Information Technology in Egypt from February to July 2011 in the caretaker government. Before being appointed as a minister, Dr. Osman was the Chairman of the Egyptian Cabinet of Ministers' Information and Decision Support Center (IDSC).

Dr. Osman is one of the Pioneers of Statistics and national information in Egypt; He is a Professor, at the Department of Statistics, Faculty of Economics and Political Science, Cairo University. In 2012, he led the World Values Survey in Egypt.

He has an extensive technical and consultancy experience in the fields of poverty targeting, statistical policies, and public policy for a number of prestigious local, regional institutions, and international organizations; such as Ministry of Urban and Rural Development, Saudi Arabia, the Economic Research Forum (ERF), UNIEF, the Canadian International Development Research Centre, UNDP, the United Nations Conference on Trade and Development (UNCTAD).

Dr. Osman is the editor and lead author of 2016 Human Development Report (HDR). The report discusses social justice in Egypt.

== National committees ==
- Ministerial Group for Human Development.
- Advisory Committee – Ministry of Higher Education.
- Fund of the Civil Affairs System – Sector of the Civil Affairs Authority –Ministry of Interior.
- Board of Directors of the National Authority for Remote Sensing.
- Board of Directors of the Authority of Standardization and Production Quality Control.
- Board of trustees - Egypt's International University.
- National Committee for Information Development – Scientific Research Academy.
- Research Council of Population and Social Sciences – Academy of Scientific Research.
- Executive committee of the National Population Council.
- Advisory Council of the Post Graduate Education Department – Cairo's Arab Academy of Financial and Banking Sciences
- Advisory Committee for Planning and Statistical Coordination – Central Agency for Public Mobilization and Statistics (CAPMAS)
- The Permanent Scientific Committee – National Council for Social and Criminal Research.
- Board of Directors of the Center for Information and Computer Systems – Faculty of Economics and Political Science – Cairo University.
- Information and Communication Committee of the National Committee of Education, Science and Culture (UNESCO – ELISCO - ESISCO).

== Family ==
Born in Cairo on November 4, 1951. He has two brothers Hussein Osman and Amr Osman. He is married to Dr. Fadia Elwan Professor of Psychology at Cairo University with three sons Hesham Osman, Walid Osman and Tarek Osman.

== Education ==
- 1984-1987 Ph.D., Biostatistics - Case Western Reserve University, Cleveland, Ohio, USA.
- 1982-1984 M.S., Biostatistics - Case Western Reserve University, Cleveland, Ohio, USA.
- 1977-1980 M.Sc., Applied Statistics - Cairo University, Cairo, Egypt.
- 1970-1974 B.Sc., Statistics - Cairo University, Cairo, Egypt.
- 1967-1970 High School Diploma - Collège de la Sainte Famille (French Language School), Cairo, Egypt.

== Publications ==
I. Publications in refereed journals:

- Osman, M. A note on: the human sex ratio and factors influencing family size in Japan. Journal of Heredity 1985; 76: 143.
- Luria, M., Debanne, S., and Osman, M. Long-term follow-up after recovery from acute myocardial infarction: observations on survival, ventricular arrhythmias and sudden death. Archives of Internal Medicine 1985; 145: 1592-1595.
- Osman, M. and Yamashita, T. A model for evaluating the effect of son or daughter preference on population size. Journal of Heredity 1987; 78: 377-382.
- Osman, M. Pattern of family sex composition preference in Egypt. Studies in African and Asian Demography, Research Monograph Series 1988; 18: 87-96.
- Osman, M. Differentials of sex preference in Egypt. Studies in African and Asian Demography, Research Monograph Series 1989; 19: 335-345.
- Osman, M. Birth spacing and nutritional status of child, in Egypt, 1988. Studies in African and Asian Demography, Research Monograph Series 1990; 20: 87-96.
- Gawad, M. and Osman, M. Effect and safety of Sertraline. The Egyptian Journal of Psychiatry 1991; 14:145-168.
- Ashoor, A., Osman, M., and Parashar, S. Head and neck and oesophagus cancers in Saudi Arabia. Saudi Medical Journal 1993;14:209-212.
- Osman, M., Magbool, G., and Kaul, K. Hegira adaptation of the NCHS weight and height charts. Annals of Saudi Medicine 1993; 13:170-171.
- Magbool, G., Kaul, K., Corea, J., Osman, M., and Al-Arfaj, A. Weight and height of Saudi children 6–16 years from the eastern province. Annals of Saudi Medicine 1993; 13:344-349.
- Sebai, Z. and Osman, M. Teaching medicine in Arabic. Journal of Family and Community Medicine 1994; 1:3-9.
- Abdel Shafy, M. and Osman, M. The compound Gompertz as a lifetime distribution. The Egyptian Statistical Journal 1995; 39:89-105.
- Osman, M. Teaching biostatistics using Epi Info. Journal of Family and Community Medicine 1995; 2:49-62.
- Osman, M. Exploring mixture of distributions using Minitab. Computers in Biology and Medicine 1997; 27:223-232.
- Al-Hussaini, E. and Osman, M. On median of finite mixture. Journal of Statistical Computation and Simulation 1997; 58: 121-142.
- Mangoud, A. et al. Utilization pattern of health care facilities in a selected Thana in Bangladesh. Journal of Preventive and Social Medicine 1997; 16:87-91.
- El-Bassiouni, M., Zayed, A. and Osman, M. An empirical study of the UAE job market expectations from business education. Arab Journal of Administrative Sciences 1999; 6: 295-311.
- Rashad, H., Osman, M., and Roudi, N. Marriage in the Arab World. Population Reference Bureau 2005.
- Osman, Magued and Shahd, Laila (2003) "Age-discrepant marriages in Egypt". In Nicholas Hopkins (eds) The New Arab Family. Cairo: The American University in Cairo Press, pp. 51–61.
- Rashad, Hoda and Osman, Magued (2003) "Nuptiality in Arab countries: Changes and implications". In Nicholas Hopkins (eds) The New Arab Family. Cairo: The American University in Cairo Press, pp. 20–50.

II. Publications in conference proceedings:

- Osman, M. and McClish, D. Survival analysis for heterogeneous populations. American Statistical Association proceedings 1985, Social Statistics, 1985; 235-240.
- Osman, M. and McClish, D. A model for survival in the presence of heterogeneity. American Statistical Association proceedings 1986, Social Statistics, 1986; 234-236.
- Osman, M. Simulation experiment of a family building model. Proceedings of the First Conference on Computer Modeling System in Human Social Sciences 1989; 83-108. Center for Information and Computer Systems, Faculty of Economics and Political Science, Cairo University.
- Osman, M. Sensitivity of fertility parameters used in population projection using ESCAP/POP. Proceedings of the Second Conference on Statistics and Computer Modeling in Human and Social Sciences 1990; Center for Information and Computer Systems, Faculty of Economics and Political Science, Cairo University.
- Osman, M. The mixture of distributions as a model for analyzing anthropometric data. In: IRD/Macro International, Inc. Proceedings of the Demographic and Health Surveys World Conference, Washington, D.C. 1991, Vol 2, Columbia, Maryland, USA 1991:1101-1113.
- Osman, M. Modeling height-for-age data in Egypt: compound vs. finite mixture normal distributions. Proceedings of the 19th International Conference on Statistics, Computer Science and Applications. 1994.
- El-Bassiouni, M. and Osman, M. Using Minitab in teaching statistical distributions. Proceedings of the International Conference for Teaching Statistics and Information Sciences. July 1994, pp. 219–232, 1994.
- Osman, M. Modeling height for age data in developing countries. Paper presented in the Fifth Islamic Countries Conference on Statistical Sciences, Malang, Indonesia, August 1996.
- Osman, M. Nutritional status in Egypt: Results from the 1992 Egypt Demographic and Health Survey. Paper presented in the Arab Regional Meeting of the International Union for the Scientific Study of Population, Cairo, December 1996.
- Osman, M. Population policies in Egypt, Jordan and Yemen. Paper presented in the Second ESCWA (UN) Meeting of Heads of National Population Councils in The Arab Countries on Population Policies and Sustainable Development, Amman, December 1997.
- Al Segeny, M., Ismaeil, S., and Osman, M. Egyptian 2000 Growth Reference Centiles for Weight, and Height Fitted by LMS Method. Proceedings of the Conference on Statistics and Computer Modeling in Human and Social Sciences 2005; Faculty of Economics and Political Science, Cairo University.

III. Books:

- Sayed, H. and Osman, M. Pregnancy, Fertility and Family Planning Practice. Ministry of Health, The Health Profile of Egypt, 1987 Cairo.
- Sayed, H., Osman, M., El-Zenaty, F. and Way, A. Egypt Demographic and Health Survey 1988. Columbia, Maryland: Institute for Resource Development, Macro System, Inc., 1989.
- Osman M. Health surveys - error in data analysis. Case Studies in Community Medicine. Ed. Z. Sebai. pp 71–81.
- Osman M. Population and Labor Force in Egypt. Cairo, Egypt: Merit Publishing, 2002.
- Osman M. Demographic Profile of the United Arab Emirates. National Research Project for Manpower Development and Education Planning, United Arab Emirates University, Emirates, 1991.
- El-Shamsy, M., Hegazi, M. and Osman, M. Women and Employment in Emirates. United Arab Emirates University, Emirates, 1996.
- Osman, M. Stunting among Egyptian children: Differentials and risk factors. In: Perspectives on the Population and Health Situation in Egypt. Ed. Mahran, M. et al. pp. 95–112. Demographic and Health surveys, Macro International Inc. Maryland, USA.
- Co-Author of Egypt Human Development Report 2004.
- Co-Author of Egypt Human Development Report 2005.

IV. Working papers:

- Osman M. Sex preference in Egypt. Working Paper # 18, Cairo Demographic Center, 1990.
- El-Bassiouni, M. and Osman, M. Using computers in teaching survey methodology course. Occasional Paper # 9, Cairo Demographic Center, 1997.

== See also ==
- List of national leaders
- Egypt
- Collège de la Sainte Famille
