= Ministry of Communications and Information Technology (Egypt) =

Government ministry of Egypt

Arab Republic of Egypt Ministry of Communications and Information Technology
- 'MCIT'
- Emblem of Egypt

Agency overview
- Formed: 1 October 1999; 27 years ago
- Jurisdiction: Government of Egypt
- Headquarters: New Administrative Capital, Cairo, Egypt
- Minister responsible: Raafat Hindy
- Website: mcit.gov.eg

The Egyptian Ministry of Communications and Information Technology (MCIT) is a government body headquartered in Smart Village Egypt. Established in 1999, the Ministry is responsible for information and communications technology (ICT) issues in the Arab Republic of Egypt, including the planning, implementation, and operation of government ICT plans and strategies. It is led by the Minister of Communications and Information Technology, who is nominated by the Prime Minister and is a member of the Cabinet. The current ICT Minister is Raafat Hendy, who assumed office in February of 2026

== Ministers ==
Ministers
Name	Term of Office
Ahmed Nazif	October 1999 - July 2004
Tarek Kamel	July 2004 - February 2011
Maged Osman	February 2011 - July 2011
Mohamed Salem	July 2011 - August 2012
Hany Mahmoud	August 2012 - January 2013
Atef Helmy	January 2013 - March 2015
Khaled Negm	March 2015 - September 2015
Yasser ElKady	September 2015 - June 2018
Amr Talaat	June 2018 – February 2026
Rafaat Hendy	February 2026 - Present

== Affiliate Organizations ==
=== Telecom Egypt ===
Telecom Egypt company is the solo governmental company that serve telecommunications in Egypt since 1854.

=== National Telecommunications Regulatory Authority ===
The National Telecommunications Regulatory Authority (NTRA) was founded in 2003 under the Telecommunications Regulation Law to serve as a national authority responsible for the administration and regulation of the telecommunication sector while maintaining transparency, open competition, universal service, and protection of users’ rights.

=== Information Technology Industry Development Agency ===
The Information Technology Industry Development Agency (ITIDA) was established in 2004 with the mandate of spearheading the development of the Egyptian IT sector and enhancing its global competitiveness. The Agency works to boost Egypt's global ICT competitiveness by developing the outsourcing and offshoring industry, boosting digital exports, and attracting FDI.

=== Egypt Post ===
Founded in 1865, Egypt Post is one of the longest-standing government organizations in Egypt. To fulfill its universal service obligation, the postal service has as many as 4,300+ outlets available nationwide.

=== Information Technology Institute ===
The Information Technology Institute (ITI) was established in 1992. Acting as the training arm of the Ministry, the Institute develops youth capabilities and skills through capacity-building programs and professional coaching.

=== National Telecommunication Institute ===
The National Telecommunication Institute (NTI) was founded in 1983 to provide education and training for telecommunication engineers, targeting local and regional markets, including the Nile Basin countries. In 2006, Cisco Systems accredited NTI as a Cisco Academy Training Center (CATC) for the MENA region.
