= Internet Revolution Egypt =

Cyber-protest in Egypt

Picture used on IRE's Facebook page

Internet Revolution Egypt (IRE for short) is an Egyptian cyber-protest against the internet services provided in Egypt on which Telecom Egypt has monopoly. The main Facebook page has about 1 million followers and continues to expand. This significant expansion resulted in a widespread media attention. It claims to have no relation to politics in response to some media accusations. The slogan used is "الأنترنت عندنا في مصر; غالي جدا , بطئ ببشاعة .. خدمة عملاء زي الزفت" which means "The internet services in Egypt; are very expensive, very slow .." The customer service is terrible". It mainly takes place on Facebook through a page created by young Egyptian activists. Some activity is also seen on Twitter. The most popular age group of the protest is the 18-24 group.

== Causes ==
- Price exaggeration of offered services in comparison with international benchmarks.
- Deterioration of the local infrastructure and no tangible attempt to upgrade it or even upgrade communication towers Resulting in continuous interruptions of the customers' internet connections.
- Speeds sold by the ISP do not meet what customers actually get on the ground.
- Unbecoming customer service.
- Telecom Egypt's monopoly on landlines.

== History ==
in December 2013, A creator by the name of "Omar Wahid" launched a YouTube video that sparked the movement, the video goes by the title "فضيحة الانترنت فى مصر وصوت المصلحة" on his channel that goes by the name "HardMode GearHead"

In February 2014, they met with the Telecommunications Regulatory Authority to present their demands, but negotiations were unsuccessful.

After a year of movements on social media, they met with the Minister of Communications and presented their demands to him, and in the end, a large part of their demands was implemented.

== Demands ==
- Reducing Prices to align with international benchmarks
- Reassigning the minimum offered speed to 8 Mbit/s for 60 EGP instead of 512 kbit/s for 95 EGP
- Having all lines work on a 1/1 basis; upload speed is equal to download speed
- Upgrading nationwide communication centres
- Removing the Fair Usage Policy
- Improving Technical and Customer Support to Individuals of Comprehension
- Implementation of the Fibre Optic technology
- Government Surveillance over all ISPs and their respective retailers
- A service of complaints under the authority of solely the government excluding any ISP intervention in this service
- Increasing the speed to 4 Mbit/s for all subscribers as a gesture of goodwill till the planned implementation of Fibre Optics in 2015
- Extending land lines to the whole nation
- Local Maintenance team in every city

As of 1 April 2014 new escalated demands were added as a result of the hubris of ISPs and NTRA and their lack of effort to see any demands accomplished.

- Resignation of the Minister Of Telecommunications, and any responsible figure for bad internet in Egypt including NTRA and Telecom Egypt Officials

== Actions ==
The first requested action was to print and post fliers (pictured). It contains the protest's demands. The page also asked people to photograph themselves with the prints and send their picture to the page for sharing them to boost Morale.

In Response to a request of support, Bassem Youssef, a famous Egyptian satirist, criticized the Egyptian ISP companies for their low quality service in his following episode of his weekly famous show El Bernameg as a gesture of his support to the IRE.

It was suggested to make a street protest but the idea was rejected due to the possible dangers and eradicate suspicions of any ties to political propaganda who might use the protest for their benefit.

On 20 February 2014, The page warned to take escalating measures against the ISPs if their demands are not met within a week.

Followers have contributed many ideas for a viable course of action against the companies like ceasing payment, street protests, attempting to attract foreign ISP investors to stimulate competition and other ideas.

On 26 February 2014, The Facebook page said that ISPs took no action and didn't respond to any of the revolution's demands within their 1-week time limit therefore they were to proceed with escalated procedures. The page asked from followers to pay their subscriptions in terms of coins (whole or half or even quarters of Egyptian pounds). They mentioned that this action is totally legal, therefore if this form of payment was to be refused then subscribers are entitled to take legal action as the law states that it is illegal for anyone to reject dealing with metal coins as coins are official recognised currency. They said that they're trying to "make them hate their lives as they made us hate ours" (نعرفهم في عيشتهم زي ماقرفونا).

On the same date they also asked people to cancel any special offers they are subscribed to and subscribe to the minimum offered speed (512 kbit/s) and share their internet connection with their neighbours in an attempt to affect the companies' revenue and make them lose as much profit as possible. They also asked members to file complaints at the National Telecommunications Regulatory Authority (NTRA) regarding the issue. The IRE stressed about the importance of this procedure as it is the first step to prove the credibility of the movement.

On a Later date, IRE said they were to have a meeting with NTRA officials. After the meeting NTRA responded by issuing a statement of their future plans to improve internet services. However their statement was regarded as vague and misleading. After a week IRE had a meeting with ISP representatives sponsored by NTRA, IRE said that that ISPS told them that they have no plans to change internet pricing but they might update some limited offers to satisfy customers. However ISPs showed no intention to give any media statement. IRE then assigned a time limit till April 1 for ISPs and NTRA to bring their promises into action buy nothing happened, so escalated demands were announced (see demands).

== See also ==
- Internet in Egypt
- Internet in Africa
