= Mohammed Salem =

Mohammed or Mohamed Salem may refer to:

- Mohammed Salem Al-Enazi (born 1976), Qatari footballer
- Mohammed Salem Saleh (born 1982), Emirati footballer
- Mohammed Salem (footballer, born 1985), Saudi footballer
- Mohamed Salem (footballer, born 1940) (1940–2008), Algerian footballer
- Mohamed Salem (footballer, born 1994), Egyptian footballer
- Mohamad Salem (born 1995), Lebanese footballer
- Mohammed Salem (photographer) (born 1985), Palestinian photojournalist

== See also ==
- Mohamed Salem (disambiguation)
- Mohammed Salim (disambiguation)
