= Sakina Fouad =

Egyptian journalist and novelist

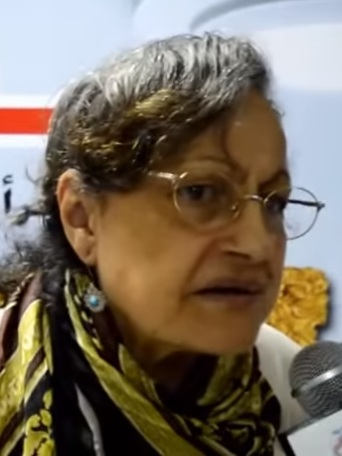
- Sakina Fouad, 14 June 2015
- Born: September 1, 1945 (age 81)
- Citizenship: Egypt
- Education: Cairo University
- Occupations: Journalist, politician, writer
- Political party: Free Egyptians Party

Sakina Jamal Fouad (Arabic:سكينة فؤاد) is an Egyptian journalist, novelist, first vice president of Egypt's opposition Democratic Front party and a member of the Egyptian Shura Council.

Fouad was born on September 1, 1945, in Port Said, northeast of Cairo, and received her Bachelor of Arts from the Faculty of Arts, Cairo University, in 1964. Sakina Fouad began her career in journalism and then literature. She married ahmed al-Jundi, editor-in-chief of the Egyptian newspaper Al-Akhbar, who died in April 2004.

She has held several positions, including editor-in-chief of a radio and television magazine, and has a weekly article in The Egyptian newspaper Al-Ahram, as well as the opposition al-Wafd newspaper. She was known for her interest in food security issues in Egypt and her criticism sought by former Egyptian Minister of Agriculture Youssef Wali.

She was one of the advisers on President Mohamed Morsi's team but resigned in protest against the supplementary constitutional declaration (November 2012).

== Works ==
=== Novels ===
- The Night of Fatima's Arrest (Novel) 1984
- Zainab's Daughters (novel)

=== Books ===
- Complete Works (Book), 1997 (collects a number of her articles on food security in Egypt and criticism of corruption and food pollution)
- Woman June (book), 1998
- Tame Men (Book), 1998
- New Wars (Book), 2003
- Circles of Love
