= Mohamed Selim =

Mohamed Selim may refer to:

- Mohamed Selim (footballer), Egyptian footballer
- Mohamed Selim Soheim, Egyptian boxer
- Mohamed Selim Zaki, Egyptian equestrian

== See also ==
- Mohammed Salim (disambiguation)
