= Ahmed Nazif =

Prime Minister of Egypt from 2004 to 2011

- أحمد نظيف
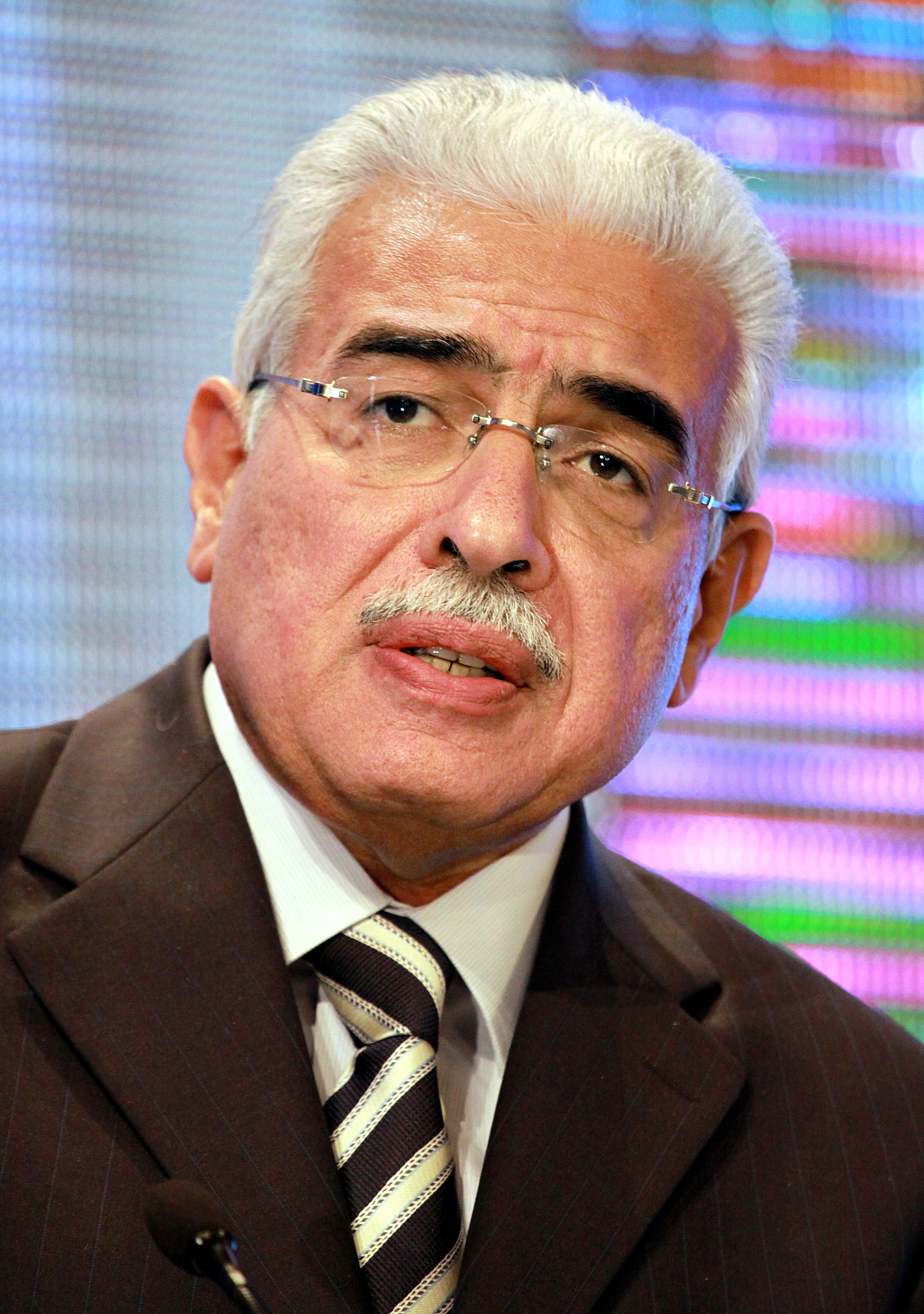
- Nazif in 2009

48th Prime Minister of Egypt
- In office 14 July 2004 – 28 January 2011
- President: Hosni Mubarak
- Preceded by: Atef Ebeid
- Succeeded by: Ahmed Shafik

1st Minister of Communications and Information Technology
- In office 5 October 1999 – 14 July 2004
- Prime Minister: Atef Ebeid
- Preceded by: Position established
- Succeeded by: Tarek Kamel

Personal details
- Born: 8 July 1952 (age 74) Alexandria, Kingdom of Egypt
- Party: National Democratic Party (1999–2011)
- Spouse(s): Mona Sayed Abdul Fattah (died) Zeinab Zaki (m. 2010)
- Children: 3
- Education: Cairo University (BSc, MSc); McGill University (PhD)

Ahmed Nazif (Arabic: أحمد نظيف, romanized: Aḥmad Naẓīf, Egyptian Arabic pronunciation: [ˈæħmæd nɑˈzˤiːf]; born 8 July 1952) is an Egyptian politician who served as the 48th prime minister of Egypt from 14 July 2004 to 29 January 2011, when his cabinet was dismissed by President Hosni Mubarak in light of a popular uprising that led to the 2011 Egyptian revolution. Nazif was acting president of Egypt from 5 March to 15 April 2010, when President Mubarak delegated his authorities to Nazif while undergoing surgery in Germany.

== Life and work ==
Nazif was born in Alexandria. President Hosni Mubarak invited him to form the new government on 9 July 2004. Prime Minister Nazif was sworn in together with fourteen new cabinet ministers on 14 July 2004. He received immediate parliamentary backing through a formal vote of confidence. He was the youngest serving prime minister of Egypt since the founding of the Republic and the second youngest prime minister in the history of modern Egypt. His cabinet was known to be mainly composed of technocrats and well educated neo-liberals.

Having come to power replacing outgoing prime minister Atef Obeid, who resigned at an emergency cabinet meeting, prompting the collapse of the four-year-old 34-member cabinet, pressure to undergo reforms was ripe. Nazif had served as the minister for communications and information technology in the Obeid Government. Before that, Nazif was a professor in the Faculty of Engineering, Cairo University.

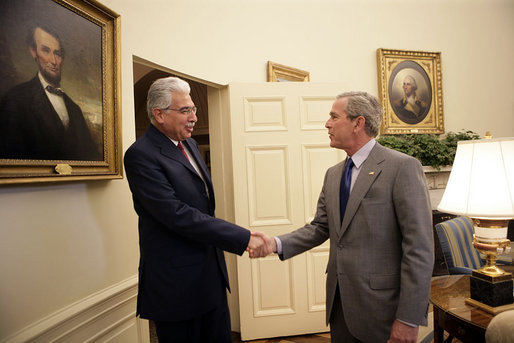
Nazif with George W. Bush

However, following the Egyptian Revolution, President Mubarak announced in his first appearance since the protests began that he had asked Nazif and his government to resign, effectively sacking one of the modern Republic's longest-serving governments. Ahmed Shafik, who had been minister of civil aviation, was appointed to replace Nazif as prime minister on 29 January 2011. He was taken into custody on April 10, 2011, following the Egyptian revolution of 2011 that incarcerated all of the governing elite, on allegations of wasting public money, corruption and allowing others to profit, pending a court trial. On May 4, 2016, a final verdict by the highest court of appeal in Egypt acquitted Nazif of all charges of corruption.

During his tenure as the first minister for communications and information technology, he was credited with establishing Egypt's free internet connectivity plan as well as improving public access to computers through low-price computers sold by private producers through the Egyptian Telecommunications Company (Telecom Egypt), which falls under the jurisdiction of the Ministry for Communications and Information Technology. Nazif's successor in the ministry of communications and longtime friend Tarek Kamel has collaborated strongly to enhance the Egyptian role in international IT markets and improve local infrastructure to support Egypt's exponentially growing demand for IT applications in everyday life. Nazif is also credited with helping to found the first computer engineering department in the Faculty of Engineering, Cairo University, leading the National Identity Card project and computerizing it, and establishing the Smart Village. He has received Egypt's First Degree Medal of Sciences and Art.

== Education and family ==
- Graduated from El Nasr Boys' School (EBS) in Alexandria, Egypt in 1969.
- B.Sc. from the Faculty of Engineering, Cairo University, majoring in communication and electronics.
- M.Sc. in electrical engineering from Cairo University in 1976.
- Ph.D. in computer engineering at McGill University, Canada in 1983.
- Nazif's wife died in 2009.
- Nazif resides in a suburban complex with his two sons. He is the son of former wealthy sailor who owned a sea shipping company, Mahmoud Nazif. His grandfather Mohammed Bey Nazif was undersecretary of Ministry of Health in the time of King Farouk.
- On January 18, 2010, it was officially announced that Nazif will marry Zeinab Zaki, vice president of Information Technology Industry Development Agency (ITIDA), in February 2010.

== See also ==
- List of national leaders
- Prime minister of Egypt
- Nazif Cabinet

Political offices
New office	Minister of Communications and Information Technology; 1999–2004	Succeeded by Tarek Kamel
Preceded by Atef Ebeid	Prime Minister of Egypt; 2004–2011	Succeeded by Ahmed Shafik
