= Mohamed Abd-el-Kader Salem =

Egyptian minister (born 1948)

Mohamed Abdel Kader Salem
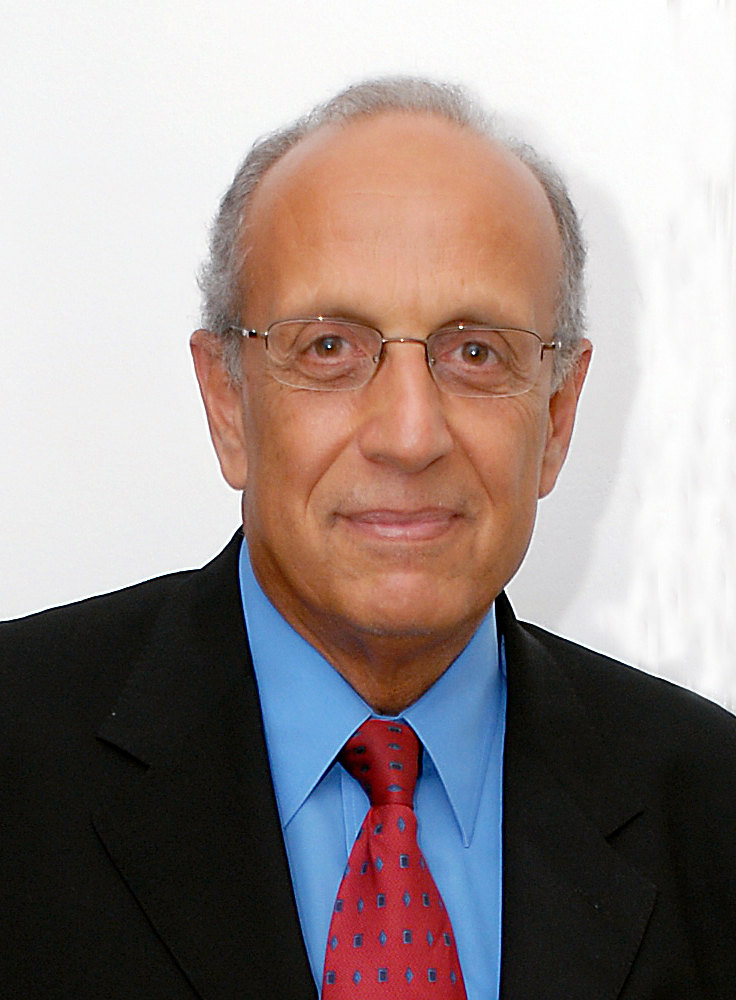

Former Minister of Communications and Information Technology
- In office 21 July 2011 – 6 December 2011
- Prime Minister: Essam Sharaf
- Preceded by: Dr. Magued Osman
- In office 7 December 2011 – 2 August 2012
- Prime Minister: Kamal Ganzouri
- Succeeded by: Eng. Hany Mahmoud

Personal details
- Born: 23 August 1948 (age 77)

Mohamed Abdel Kader Salem (Arabic: محمد عبد القادر سالم; born 23 August 1948) is an Egyptian academic and politician. He serve as Egyptian Minister of Communications and Information Technology.

== Early life ==
Salem holds a Ph.D. and M.Sc. in electrical engineering-computers and systems engineering, from Faculty of Engineering Ain Shams University, and B.Sc. in electrical engineering from the Military Technical College.

== Career ==
Salem retired from Egypt's Armed Forces in June 1993 as a brigadier general. He joined ITI Information Technology Institute as the manager of its graduate department. Soon after he was promoted to be the Vice Chairman of ITI, and chairman in July 2002.

On July 21, 2011, he was sworn in as Egypt's 4th Minister of Communications and Information Technology, as a member of Essam Sharaf's Cabinet. On December 7, he became Minister of Communications and Information Technology.

Salem led the efforts to elect Egypt to chair the executive office of Arab ministers of communications and information technology, He chaired the office in June 2012.

As minister of communications and information technology Salem chaired the boards of the National Telecommunications Regulatory Authority (NTRA), the Information Technology Industry Development Agency (ITIDA), National Telecommunication Institute (NTI), the Information Technology Institute (ITI), the Technology Innovation and Entrepreneurship Center (TIEC), and oversaw Telecom Egypt (TE) and Egypt Post.

In May 2015, Salem was appointed by prime minister Ibrahim Mahlab to the board of Telecom Egypt. He was elected chairman. He also held the position of chairman of the Board of TeData Company.

Salem served on the board of advisory, trustees, and directors in various universities, institutes, centers. He chaired international conferences in ICT, GIS, and MM.

=== Academics ===
For more than 30 years, Salem was a lecturer of computer engineering, information systems and computer science in artificial intelligence and expert systems, software engineering, management information systems, software project management, decision support systems and electronic commerce, at Cairo University, the Arab Academy for Sciences and Technology, and many others. As a consultant he worked in computers and information systems, information technology and artificial intelligence applications.

=== Consultancy ===
Salem works as senior consultant of communications and information technology for regional and international organizations.

He performs keynote speeches at conferences and webinars. He lectures in workshops, universities, and international organizations in communications and information technology.

== Personal life ==
Salem is married, with two children and three granddaughters.

== Publications ==
- GIS Professional Training, Egypt's Experience, Kuwait 1st International GIS Conference, Kuwait 5-7 Feb., 2005.
- ITI Experience Towards E-Learning, 3rd Conference on E-Learning Applications, AUC, Cairo, 15-16 Jan., 2005.
- Distant Learning, ITI Experience, Using the IT & Telecommunication in E-Education (with focus on the Arabic content on the Internet), Regional Seminar, Damascus, Syria, and 15-17 Jul., 2003.
- Distant Learning, Will it Become the First Discipline? OICC 7th Seminar on GIS applications in Planning and Sustainable Development, Cairo Egypt, 13-15 Feb., 2001.
- Adaptive Intelligent Agent, a Design Approach for a Decision Support System, Scientific Bulletin, Faculty of Engineering, Ain Shams University, No. 01/31, 31/3/1996.
- Computer Network Security, Technology and Armament Magazine, Vol. 5, No. 3, July 1990.
- Computer Virus, Assigned Research by His Excellency the Egyptian Chief of Staff of the Armed Forces, January 1990
