= Mohamed Salem =

Mohamed Salem may refer to:

- Mohamed Salem (footballer, born 1940) (1940–2008), Algerian footballer
- Mohamed Salem (footballer, born 1994), Egyptian footballer
- Mohamed Salem (wrestler) (born 1944), Egyptian Olympic wrestler
- Mohamed Ben Salem (born 1953), Tunisian politician
- Mohamed Abd-el-Kader Salem, Egyptian academic and politician
- Mohamed Salem Al-Tunaiji (born 1969), Emirati middle-distance runner

== See also ==
- Mohammed Salem (disambiguation)
- Mohamed Salim, Emirati footballer
