= Ahmed El-Leithy =

Egyptian politician

Ahmed El-Leithy (born 1945) was appointed Minister of Agriculture and Land Reclamation of Egypt in Nazif's first Cabinet in 2004.

== Biography ==
He replaced Yousef Wali in Nazif's new cabinet which was formed on July 9, 2004. He was chosen as governor of the International Fund for Agricultural Development in 2005.

El-Leithy was replaced by businessman Amin Ahmed Mohamed Othman Abaza, a major player in the cotton industry, in Nazif's second Cabinet, which sworn in on Saturday, December 31, 2005. The replacement came among the appointment of a number of prominent business figures to set the wheels of economic reform in motion.
