= Tarek Kamel =

Egyptian politician (1962–2019)

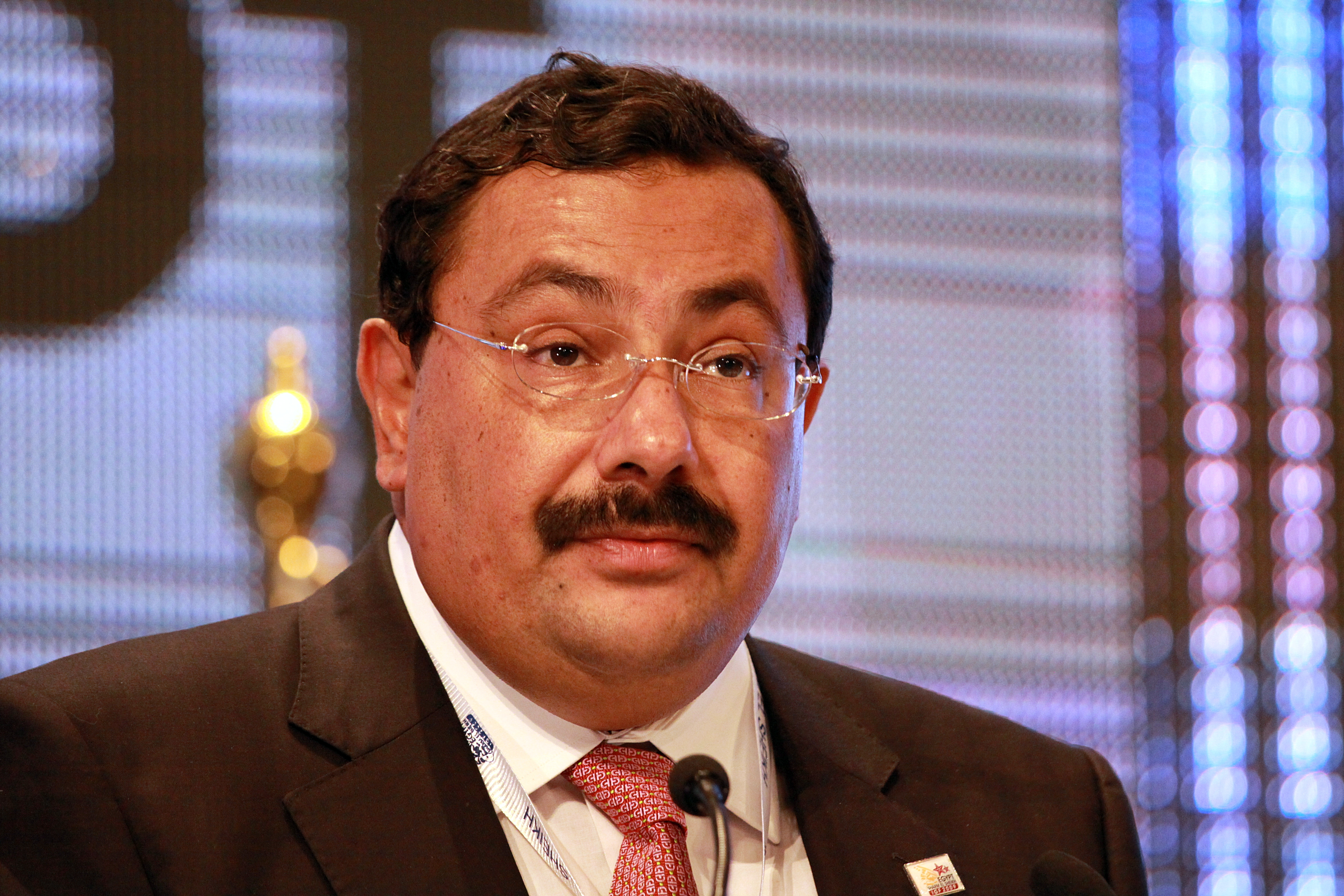

Egyptian expert on global Internet governance

Personal details
- Born: 8 May 1962
- Died: 10 October 2019 (aged 57)

Tarek Kamel (8 May 1962 – 10 October 2019) was an Egyptian politician and computer engineer expert in global Internet governance issues.

== Early life and education ==
Tarek Kamel was born in Cairo, Egypt on 8 May 1962. He graduated from Cairo University with a B.Sc. in electrical engineering and then received an M.Sc. in electrical engineering from the same school. From 1989 to 1992 he pursued his Ph.D. in electrical engineering and information technology at the Technical University of Munich with the support of the German Academic Exchange Service (DAAD).

== Career ==
Kamel started his career as a network support engineer for the Academy of Scientific Research and Technology, then an assistant researcher at the Electronics Research Institute. Returning to Egypt from Germany, he became manager of the Communications and Networking Department at the Cabinet Information and Decision Support Centre (IDSC/RITSEC), and gained a professorship at the ERI. It is during this period (from 1992 to 1999) that he established Egypt's first connection to the Internet, steered the introduction of commercial Internet services in Egypt and founded the Internet Society of Egypt. Kamel joined the ministry of communications and information technology since its formation in October 1999, where he had been appointed senior advisor to the minister following his pioneering efforts in ICT. He was board member of Telecom Egypt from 2000 to 2004 and a board member of Egypt’s Private Public Technology Development Fund (TDF) to support start ups and incubators in ICT from 2002 to 2004.

Kamel served as the minister of communications and information technology from July 2004 to February 2011.

Besides his ministerial role, Kamel was the chairman of the National Telecommunications Regulatory Authority (NTRA), the Information Technology Industry Development Agency (ITIDA), the National Telecommunication Institute (NTI) and the Information Technology Institute’s (ITI) Boards of Trustees.

Kamel served as a member of the Internet Society (ISOC) Board of Trustees and as vice president for chapters from 1999 to 2002. He is a founding member and a previous board member of AFRINIC. He acted as Chairman of the Executive Bureau of Arab Telecommunications and Information Council of Ministers from 2004 to 2008 and the Chairman of the Ministerial Conference on Communication and Information Technologies of the African Union from 2006 to 2008. In recognition of his leadership in the ICT sector, the South African Ministry of Communications named him, in 2005, "Top Minister in Africa with an ICT Portfolio". He was a board member of the National Telecom Regulatory Authority of Egypt from April 2011 to July 2012.

In August 2012 ICANN appointed Kamel as a senior advisor to its president and Senior Vice President of Global Government and IGO Engagement, making him the first national of a developing country to fill one of ICANN's senior management posts. He led the development of the ICANN organization Government Engagement team and spearheaded efforts to strengthen relationships between ICANN and governments, ministries, and IGOs.

In September 2025, Kamel was inducted posthumously into the Internet Hall of Fame.

== Personal life ==
Kamel was married to Iman El Azab, faculty member at Cairo University. They had two children. He died in Switzerland on 10 October 2019 from kidney failure as a complication of cancer.
