= Yasser ElKady =

Egyptian minister (born 1962)

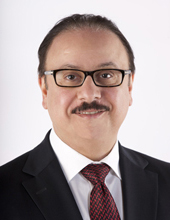

Minister of Communications and Information Technology
- In office 19 September 2015 – 14 June 2018
- President: Abdel Fattah el-Sisi
- Prime Minister: Sherif Ismail
- Preceded by: Khaled Negm
- Succeeded by: Amr Talaat

Personal details
- Born: April 6, 1962 (age 64)
- Party: Independent

Yasser ElKady ياسر القاضي was the Minister of Communications and Information Technology in Egypt between 19 September 2015 and 14 June 2018. ElKady has been in the IT and Telecom industry for over 25 years with solid experience in strategic planning, technology integration, business development and organizational transformation.

== Education ==
After earning a bachelor's degree in Electronics and Data Communications Engineering from Cairo University.

== Career ==
In January 2014, ElKady held the position of the Regional Director for HP Networking in the Middle East, Mediterranean and Africa (MEMA) for HP Egypt.

From October 2010 to January 2014, he was the CEO of the Egyptian Information Technology Industry Development Agency (ITIDA) leading its efforts to develop the IT industry in Egypt, achieving export revenue of US$1.4 billion and maintaining healthy growth margins for local IT vendors in the economic downturn following the revolution.

Throughout his career, ElKady spearheaded a number of national developmental initiatives. As a first deputy to the Minister of Investment, he led Egypt Investment promotion efforts, and supervised strategic investment projects worth US$16 billion; he also contributed to developing the national ICT and innovation strategy, as a board member in ITIDA, and a member in the Ministry of ICT advisory board.

Before joining the government ElKady led several notable, highly successful enterprises through periods of significant growth. He started Cisco Egypt from ground up and grew the business by 70-fold. He then led Cisco's strategy and business development efforts in MEA and Emerging Markets to realize 40% Y-to-Y growth and a business worth US$750 million. He managed to establish Orascom IIS as the first communication supplier in Egypt, and led Jeraisy Co. to double its market share in a year time.

== Member Of ==
ElKady's expertise has been the reason for his selection as a board member in key economic and developmental institutions including Egypt's General Authority for Investment and Free Zones (GAFI), the advisory board of the Ministry of Communications and Information Technology, Credit Agricole Egypt and Information Technology Industry development Agency prior to his appointment as the CEO.

== Awards ==
He was awarded the Algerian Government Country Transformation Award (2006), the Jordan Education Initiative certificate of excellence (2005), and The Palestinian Telecom Organization reform recognition (2005). Throughout his career at Cisco, he has been recognized as the Country Manager of the year for 2 consecutive years, in addition to a number of other awards for Team Building, Thought Leadership, and Outstanding performance.

== Experience ==
- Regional Director for HP Networking in the Middle East, Mediterranean and Africa (MEMA) Region and the Managing Director for HP Egypt
- CEO of the Information Technology Industry Development Agency (ITIDA)

Leading ITIDA efforts to develop the IT industry in Egypt

- First Deputy to The Minister Of Investment - Ministry of Investment

Overseeing the Ministry's investment promotion initiatives, and strategic investment projects worth US$16 billion.

- Managing Director MEA - CISCO Systems

Leading Cisco's Strategy and Business Development efforts in 60 countries in the Middle East, Africa, and Emerging Markets, achieving 40% Year-on-Year growth and a business worth of US$750 million.

- Regional Director and General Manager, North Africa & Levant And IRAQ - Cisco Systems Inc

Driving Cisco's business in the region to reach US$450 million, and maintaining 30% YoY Growth rates
