= Atef Ebeid =

Prime Minister of Egypt from 1999 to 2004

- عاطف عبيد
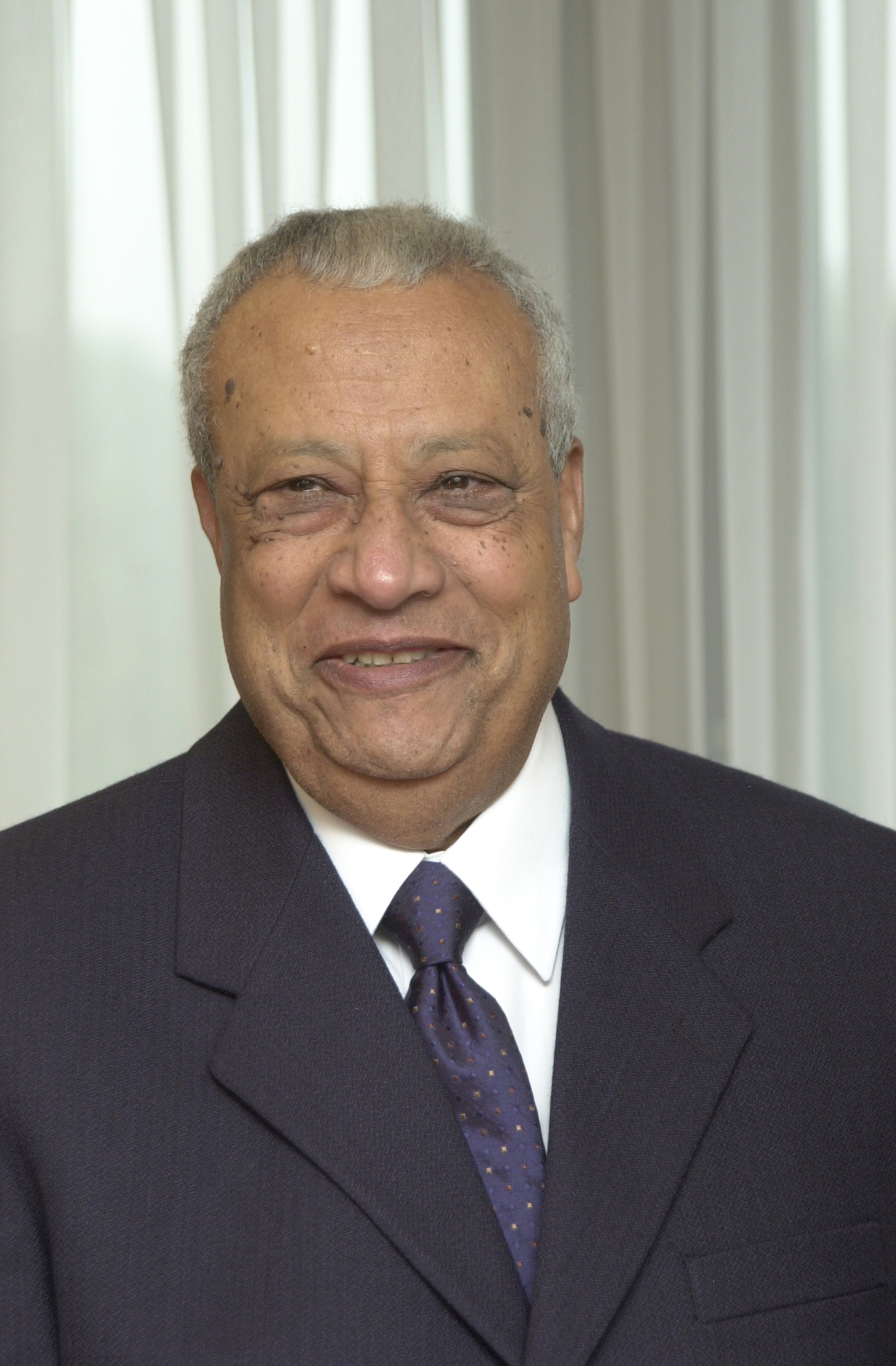
- Atef Ebeid in 2002

47th Prime Minister of Egypt
- In office 5 October 1999 – 14 July 2004
- President: Hosni Mubarak
- Preceded by: Kamal Ganzouri
- Succeeded by: Ahmed Nazif

Personal details
- Born: 14 April 1932 Tanta, Kingdom of Egypt
- Died: 12 September 2014 (aged 82)
- Party: National Democratic Party (Egypt)
- Education: Cairo University; University of Illinois at Urbana-Champaign

Atef Muhammad Ebeid (Arabic: عاطف محمد عبيد, romanized: ʿAtif Muḥammad ʿAbaid, IPA: [ˈʕɑːtˤef mæˈħæmmæd ʕeˈbeːd]; 14 April 1932 – 12 September 2014) was an Egyptian politician who served in various capacities in the governments of Egypt. He was the 47th prime minister of Egypt from 1999 to 2004.

== Early life and education ==
Ebeid was born in Tanta, Gharbia Governorate, on 14 April 1932. He graduated from Cairo University in 1955 and received a PhD from the University of Illinois at Urbana–Champaign in 1962.

== Career ==
Ebeid was professor of business at Cairo University until joining politics. In the 1980s he was the Minister of Cabinet Affairs. He served as the Minister for Domestic Development under the Sedki government, and then as Minister of Planning in the government of Kamal Ganzouri. He served as Prime Minister from 5 October 1999 to July 2004. He was sworn in on 5 October 1999, replacing Ganzouri.

Ebeid served as the acting president of Egypt from 20 June 2004 to 6 July 2004, a period during which President Hosni Mubarak was receiving medical treatment in Germany. He was also an economic advisor to Mubarak. He resigned on 9 July 2004, amid increasing pressure from part of the business community demanding more rapid privatization and less state regulation. Ahmed Nazif replaced him in the post.

Then Ebeid headed the Arab International Bank, a popular post with former Egyptian prime ministers. In April 2011 he was removed from office by Prime Minister Essam Sharaf due to corruption allegations. He also wrote for the Akhbar Alyoum.

=== Controversy ===
Ebeid was sentenced to ten years in prison on 1 March 2012 for squandering public funds. His assets were also frozen previously. In early January 2013 the Egypt's Court of Appeal overturned the verdict and ordered the ex-PM's retrial, which was held at late January 2013. The court again acquitted him of fraud charges in land case. He died on 12 September 2014.

Political offices
| Preceded by Kamal Ganzouri | Prime Minister of Egypt; 1999–2004 | Next: Ahmed Nazif |
