= Khaled Negm =

Egyptian politician

Former Minister of Communications and Information Technology
- In office March 2015 – 19 September 2015
- President: Abdel Fattah el-Sisi
- Prime Minister: Ibrahim Mahlab
- Succeeded by: Yasser ElKady
- Preceded by: Atef Helmy

Personal details
- Party: Independent

Khaled Negm (Arabic: خالد نجم) was the Egyptian minister of communications and information technology from March to September 2015.
