= Amr Talaat =

Minister of Communications and Information Technology of Egypt

His Excellency Amr Talaat DBA
- عمرو طلعت
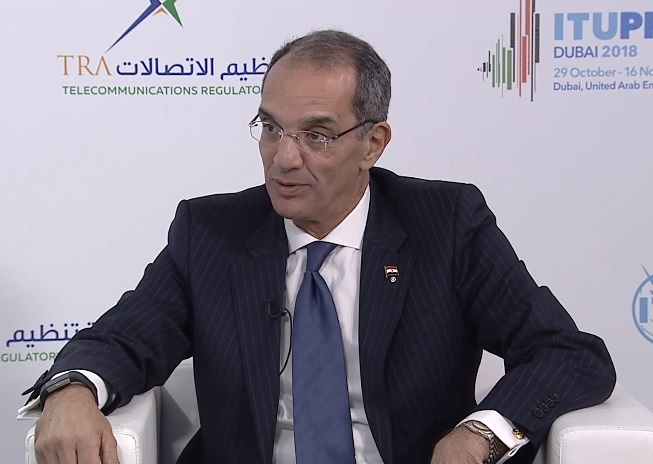

Minister of Communications and Information Technology of Egypt
- In office June 14, 2018 – February 11, 2026
- Appointed by: The President of Egypt
- President: Abdel Fattah el-Sisi
- Prime Minister: Mostafa Madbouly
- Preceded by: Yasser ElKady
- Succeeded by: Rafaat Hindy

Personal details
- Born: Amr Ahmed Samih Talaat; March 10, 1961 (age 65) Egypt
- Education: Cairo University; Illinois Institute of Technology; ESLSCA University; University of Paris
- Website: mcit.gov.eg

Amr Ahmed Samih Talaat (Note: Arabic: عمرو أحمد سميح طلعت, [ʕæmɾ ʔħmæd sæmiħ tˤɑlʕæt]) (born March 10, 1961) is an Egyptian engineer, academic, and government official who served as the Minister of Communications and Information Technology of Egypt from June 14, 2018 to February 11, 2026. Before his appointment as minister, he had a long career in the private sector, including a tenure at IBM Masr where he served as Country general manager. Talaat holds degrees in engineering and business administration and has also been active in academia as an adjunct professor at Cairo University. In his role as minister, he has been instrumental in advancing Egypt's digital infrastructure and implementing the country's digital transformation strategy.

== Early life and education ==
Amr Talaat was born on March 10, 1961, in Egypt. He pursued his early education in engineering, graduating from Faculty of Engineering, Cairo University. Talaat furthered his studies in the United States, earning a Master of Science in Computer Science from Illinois Institute of Technology. He also completed a Master of Business Administration from Paris ESLSCA Business School and a Doctor of Business Administration from University of Paris, Paris School of Business.

== Academic and professional involvement ==
Amr Talaat is an adjunct instructor at Cairo University, where he teaches courses on marketing and sales strategies, organizational behavior, and strategic management. He is an honorary member of the ICT Board at Cairo University and a member of the ICT Board of the Academy of Scientific Research and Technology (ASRT). Furthermore, he serves as the chairman of the ICT Committee at Egypt's American Chamber of Commerce which is known as AmCham.

== IBM Egypt (1988–2018) ==
In August 1988, Amr Talaat joined IBM Egypt, where he held various managerial positions. He became the IBM Country general manager on May 23, 2010, after serving as a Territory Manager since 2005. In these roles, he oversaw the company's Systems and Technology Group and its Business Partner Organization.

During his tenure, Talaat focused on achieving corporate financial goals while also moving into strategic and operational areas. These efforts included building human capital, strengthening customer loyalty, promoting corporate social responsibility, and enhancing employees’ Key performance indicators (KPIs).

== Minister of Communications and Information Technology (2018–present) ==
=== Nomination and confirmation ===
On June 14, 2018, Amr Talaat was appointed as the Minister of Communications and Information Technology (MCIT) of Egypt after taking the constitutional oath before President of Egypt, Abdel Fattah al-Sisi as part of the formation of Prime Minister Mostafa Madbouly's First Cabinet at the Al Ettihadiya Palace in Cairo. On July 3, 2024, he was sworn in again as part of Prime Minister Mostafa Madbouly's Second Cabinet.

=== Tenure ===
As minister, he led implementing the Egyptian Digital Transformation Initiative, which is part of the broader Sustainable Development Strategy; Egypt Vision 2030. His initiatives focus on developing and securing the country's IT and telecom infrastructure, improving government services, and fostering a generation of professionals skilled in advanced digital technologies.

During his tenure, Egypt hosted ITU World Radio Communication Conference 2019 in Sharm El Sheikh; the New Administrative Capital (NAC) was designated as the Arab Digital Capital for 2021. Under leadership by him, Egypt chaired the 51st Ordinary Session of the Executive Bureau of the Arab Telecommunications and Information Council of Ministers (ATICM), organized by the League of Arab States. Additionally, Egypt chaired the 26th Session of the ATICM, during which the Arab ICT Strategy was adopted.

The achievements also included Egypt's prominence from category "C" in the World Bank's GovTech Maturity Index in 2018, to Category "B" in 2020, then Category "A" in 2022. Increasing Egypt's Submarine Cable Landing Stations from 7 to 10 stations within one year.

Egypt received the Speed test Award for the fastest fixed Internet speed in Africa from Speedtest by Ookla for the first and second quarters of 2022. This recognition reflects the progress made in upgrading the country's Internet infrastructure, with median fixed broadband speeds rising from 6.5 Mbps in 2019 to 46 Mbps.

==== Digital Egypt strategy and launch of Digital Egypt Portal ====
Amr Talaat oversees Egypt's digital transformation efforts. Under his leadership, the development of the New Administrative Capital (NAC) aims to centralize government operations and shift towards a paperless, digital government. This includes the digitalization of government services, initially piloted in Port Said and now expanded nationwide, offering a platform for accessing various services. The digitalization initiative includes over 113 services in Port Said, with 34 services available across the country and 150,000 citizens registered for digital identities. These efforts are part of Egypt Vision 2030, focusing on comprehensive digital transformation. With over 18,000 government buildings connected to a fiber-optic network and the establishment of innovation centers. The New Administrative Capital features modern data centers and secure networks, and ongoing projects include automating health services and implementing e-signature solutions.

===== the Personal Data Protection Law =====
Talaat has emphasized the significance of the Personal Data Protection Law, enacted as Law No. 151 of 2020, for safeguarding personal data and fostering a secure digital environment in Egypt. The law, approved by President Abdel Fattah El-Sisi, is expected to attract international investment to Egypt's data center industry and support economic growth. Talaat notes that Egypt's strategic location and abundant electricity resources, along with the Integrated Sustainable Energy Strategy (ISES) aims to increase the share of renewable energy to 20% of the electric power mix by 2022 and 42% by 2035.

==== Egyptian Postal Service transformation ====
In 2019, the Egyptian National Postal Authority and the MICT led by Talaat, began a modernization plan that included renovating the Egyptian Postal Museum in Cairo. Originally established in 1940, the museum was expanded to 15 halls and now displays over 3,000 items related to Egypt's postal history.

Egypt Post has diversified its services beyond traditional postal functions to include financial, postal, and governmental services. It manages approximately 25 million savings accounts, launched the Yalla App in 2022 for online payments and transfers, and supports SMEs with shipping services. The organization has also partnered with Qatar Post to reduce international remittance costs, aligning with Egypt Vision 2030 and the UN Sustainable Development Goals.

==== Improvement of telecom quality ====
In 2021, Talaat announced that the National Telecom Regulatory Authority (NTRA) has approved the allocation of 40 MHz of spectrum in the 2600 MHz band to Vodafone Egypt, Etisalat Misr, and Telecom Egypt, with investments of $1.17 billion. This initiative aims to enhance telecommunications services in Egypt, improving voice and data quality. NTRA has directed mobile operators to implement necessary measures and optimize spectrum use, while monitoring service quality and enforcing compliance with standards. Launch of NTRA's Quality Measurement and Monitoring Center established in 2019.

===== Regional data hub =====
Talaat witnessed the signing of a cooperation agreement between Telecom Egypt and Cloud4C, a SAP strategic partner, to enhance Egypt's digital infrastructure. The agreement designates the largest commercial data center in Egypt, Telecom Egypt's Regional Data Hub (RDH) as a certified international data center to host Cloud4C appliances for providing "RISE with SAP" services. This initiative supports Egypt's digital transformation goals, offering cloud services to various sectors, including finance and healthcare, while also advancing data security and infrastructure. Talaat emphasized the importance of this agreement in promoting investment in data centers and cloud computing, and in preparing a skilled workforce for digital transformation in the country.

===== Electronics design hub =====
In April 2021, Under Talaat's supervision, The Information Technology Industry Development Authority (ITIDA) signed a memorandum of understanding with the Industrial Modernization Center and Siemens Egypt to establish the Electronics Design Hub, an innovation center in Knowledge City, located in Egypt's New Administrative Capital. The center is aiming to promote advanced manufacturing technologies, provide training in automation and digitization, and support the development of Egypt's industrial sector as part of Egypt Makes Electronics initiative, which is part of broader efforts to enhance Egypt's role in electronics design and manufacturing and to support digital transformation across various industries.

==== Establishments ====
===== National Council for Artificial Intelligence =====
In November 2019, Amr Talaat, as Minister of Communications and Information Technology, chaired the establishment of the National Council for Artificial Intelligence. This platform aims to facilitate discussions among stakeholders on AI topics, foster AI partnerships, promote innovation, and support research and capacity building. It provides information on the implementation of the national AI strategy and related policies and programs.

===== National Academy of Information Technology for Persons with Disabilities =====
Talaat has played a key role in advancing technology for social inclusion, particularly for Persons with Disabilities (PwDs). in July 2018, he oversaw the establishment of the National Academy of Information Technology for Persons with Disabilities (NAID), which focuses on training PwDs in Assistive Technologies to support their contribution to Egypt's economic and social development. In January 2020, under Talaat's leadership, the MICT signed a memorandum of understanding with the Japanese Assistive Technology Development Organization (ATDO). This agreement aims to enhance digital inclusion for PwDs and to establish a joint center of excellence in universal design and Assistive Technology at NAID.

===== Applied Innovation Center =====
The Applied Innovation Center (AIC) was established under the leadership of Talaat to advance the use of emerging Information and Communications Technologies in addressing national challenges. It focuses on developing human capital and fostering innovation. The center works on creating and testing solutions for key national issues and often pilots these solutions to assess their scalability. AIC aims to enhance skills in areas like Artificial Intelligence, big data, High Performance Computing, automation, IoT, and cybersecurity, supporting the growth of Egypt's ICT sector. It also helps build local high-tech enterprises for government and private sector projects. The center has established partnerships with educational institutions and multinational companies and is equipped with a high-performance computer for use by its partners.

===== Egypt University of Informatics =====
The Egyptian University of Informatics (EUI) was recently inaugurated as part of a presidential initiative, officially opening at Knowledge City in the New Administrative Capital. Established by the Ministry of Communications and Information Technology, EUI is recognized as the first university in the MENA region to specialize in information and communications technology. Its status is enhanced by international partnerships with leading universities in the technology and communications sectors. Notably, EUI has established dual degree programs with Purdue University and has an agreement with the University of Minnesota. The first building of EUI began hosting classes in October 2021. The university offers programs through its four faculties: the Faculty of Computer and Information Sciences, the Faculty of Engineering, the Faculty of Business Technology, and the Faculty of Digital Arts and Design.

===== Applied Technology Schools =====
In December 2023, Egypt launched a series of Applied Technology Schools aimed at reshaping technical education in the country. These schools are designed to produce highly qualified technical professionals by aligning educational programs with the demands of the labor market. They offer students technical and field training using modern equipment and the latest technology. The Schools have been established in Cairo, Giza, Alexandria, Suez, Minya, New Valley, Port Said, Sharqia, Qalubiya, Monufia.

==== Partnerships and initiatives ====
===== Digital Egypt Initiatives (DEBI – DECI) =====
In September 2020, the Egyptian MICT, under the leadership of Talaat, launched the Digital Egypt Builders Initiative (DEBI). The initiative was introduced during the opening of educational facilities by President of Egypt, Abdel Fattah El-Sisi and is a key component of the "human development" pillar within the broader Digital Egypt strategy.

DEBI, a state-funded program, with facilitated partnerships with international technology companies such as Microsoft, IBM, Cisco, VMware, and Amazon Web Services, awards top graduates from Engineering and Computer Science faculties with professional master's degrees in fields like data science, artificial intelligence (AI), cybersecurity, robotics, and digital arts. Talaat emphasized that these partnerships are crucial for capacity building within the Ministry's strategy and the broader Digital Egypt vision, aiming to bridge the professional skills gap in the ICT sector through technical and practical training. The initiative is structured to offer specialized training in various ICT fields, alongside courses in leadership, management, English language, innovation and entrepreneurship, and freelancing skills.

In May 2022, Talaat oversees the Digital Egypt Cubs Initiative (DECI), a program aimed at developing the technological skills of 3,000 students annually from grades seven to eleven. Launched with a $25 million budget, the initiative partners with leading tech companies like Cisco, IBM, and Microsoft to provide training in fields such as digital arts, software development, and artificial intelligence. DECI is part of Talaat's broader efforts to align Egypt's education system with future labor market demands, ensuring that young Egyptians are equipped with the necessary skills in emerging technologies.

===== Egypt FWD initiative with Udacity =====
Launched as part of the Digital Egypt Strategy, the Egypt FWD initiative is a program overseen by Minister of Communications and Information Technology Amr Talaat. Managed by the Information Technology Industry Development Agency (ITIDA), the initiative aims to train 100,000 young Egyptians in digital skills through a partnership with Udacity. The 18-month scholarship program provides participants with access to online learning, hands-on projects, professional mentorship, and peer support, with the goal of enhancing their readiness for remote work and local job markets.

===== Creativa Innovation Hubs and InnovEgypt Strategy =====
Talaat has overseen the development of Creativa Innovation Hubs as part of Egypt's broader InnovEgypt Strategy. These hubs, established at universities across the country, are established to support and foster entrepreneurship, innovation, and provide training in IT and emerging technologies. The InnovEgypt Strategy is focused on building a digital economy by encouraging start-ups, advancing technological innovation, and enhancing digital skills. Through these initiatives, Egypt is working to strengthen its position in the regional technology and innovation landscape.

Under Talaat's leadership, the MCIT undertook the development and restoration of the historic Sultan Hussein Kamel Palace in Heliopolis in 2019. This project was part of a broader effort to repurpose historical and cultural sites into Innovation Hubs, preserving their architectural integrity while advancing technological progress.

In 2021, the Information Technology Industry Development Authority signed a memorandum of understanding with Plug and Play, a global startup enabler. As a result, Plug and Play established an office at the Sultan Hussein Kamel Palace and developed the Creativa Innovation Hub. This partnership aims to enhance Egypt's startup ecosystem, bolster its position as a leading innovation hub in the MENA region, and support both early-stage and growth-stage startups.

== See also ==
- Cabinet of Egypt
- First Madbouly Cabinet
- Ministry of Communications and Information Technology (Egypt)

Political offices
Preceded by Yasser ElKady	Minister of Communications and Information Technology of Egypt; 2018–present	Incumbent
