= Raafat Hindy =

Egyptian civil servant (born 1965)

Raafat Hendy

Minister of Communications and Information Technology of Egypt
- Incumbent
- Assumed office February 12, 2026
- Appointed by: The President of Egypt
- President: Abdel Fattah el-Sisi
- Preceded by: Amr Talaat

Raafat Abd El-Aziz Fahmy Mohamed Amin Hendy (born 1965) is an Egyptian government official serving as the Minister of Communications and Information Technology in the second cabinet of Prime Minister Mostafa Madbouly since February 2026, succeeding Amr Talaat.

== Career ==
In 2006, Hendy established the Telecommunications and Infrastructure Sector at the Ministry of Communications and Information Technology, which carried out more than 100 national technology infrastructure projects, among them the technological infrastructure for Smart Village, the Egyptian Universities Network, and Egypt's first electronic payment card system.

In July 2018, he was appointed head of the ministry's General Secretariat Sector, a role he held concurrently with his leadership of the Telecommunications and Infrastructure Sector. In June 2024, he became Vice ICT Minister for Infrastructure.

In February 2026, he was appointed Minister of Communications and Information Technology.
