= Yousef Wali =

Egyptian politician (1930–2020)

Yousef Waly (Arabic: يوسف والي; 2 April 1930 – 5 September 2020) was an Egyptian politician who served as Minister of Agriculture and Land Reclamation from 1982 to 2004. Wali was not married but he's a godfather and uncle to three siblings, Amin Waly, Hoda Waly and Sherif Waly the youngest, who became later a Senator and a leader in the National Democratic Party (NDP).

== Biography ==
During Wali's tenure as Minister of Agriculture and Land Reclamation and as a Deputy Prime Minister, he worked to obtain funding for research and development in agriculture which helped Egypt increase the productivity of the land for crops such as maize, wheat, rice, and cotton to unprecedented rates.

=== Fertilizer scandal ===
Wali came under criticism in the parliament and in the press, (the "fertilizer scandal") accusing him of importing 10,000 tons of fertilizers contaminated with carcinogenic materials. It was claimed that, by dissolving the Ministry of Agriculture's Pesticide Supervision Committee in 1999, Wali paved the way for the importation of banned chemicals.

In a letter to the press, Wali denied allowing any carcinogenic pesticides in Egypt while he was in office. He stated that, to replace the committee, an even stricter pesticide supervision office was set up and remained active until 2003, when the committee of recommendation and registration of pesticides was formed. Measures had been taken to control pesticide use, Wali added: prohibiting aeroplane spraying throughout the country and the use of chemical pesticides in the southern Delta; planting self-reliant strains to reduce the need for pesticides; and using so-called safe bacteria in 265,000 feddans.

While what appeared on the surface may not be the whole truth, some see the events as another tragic victory in the war between "chemical pesticides" and "bio-pesticides" in Egyptian agriculture.

=== Nazif's cabinet reshuffle ===
Wali was replaced by Ahmed El-Leithy in the cabinet of Prime Minister Ahmed Nazif that was formed on 9 July 2004. El-Leithy imposed strict measures on the types of imported pesticides and acknowledged the economic advantages of organically grown crops.

== Death ==
Wali died on 5 September 2020, aged 89.
