= Mohamed Selim (footballer) =

Egyptian footballer (born 1998)

Personal information
- Full name: Mohamed Ahmed Selim
- Date of birth: 1 April 1998 (age 28)
- Place of birth: Bilbeis, Egypt
- Height: 1.84 m (6 ft 0 in)
- Positions: Midfielder; left winger

Team information
- Current team: Haras El Hodoud
- Number: 27

Youth career
- 2003–2006: Tersana
- 2006–2009: ENPPI
- 2009–2010: Lombardia Uno
- 2010–2016: Pro Sesto

Senior career*
| Years | Team | Apps | (Gls) |
| 2016–2018 | Pro Sesto | 2 | (0) |
| 2016–2017 | → Cernusco Merate (loan) | 14 | (7) |
| 2017 | → Legnano (loan) | 6 | (0) |
| 2018 | FBC Varzi | 14 | (3) |
| 2019 | Stade Tunisien | 5 | (0) |
| 2019–2020 | Haras El Hodoud | 1 | (0) |
| 2021 | FBC Varzi | 0 | (0) |
| 2022 | Vis Nova | 7 | (0) |
| 2022 | Muggiò | 1 | (0) |
| Total | | 50 | (10) |
- * Club domestic league appearances and goals

Mohamed Ahmed Selim (Arabic: محمد سليم; born 1 April 1998), is an Egyptian former footballer who played as a midfielder.

== Career ==
Born in Bilbeis, Egypt, Selim began his career with Tersana at the age of five, spending three years before a move to ENPPI. In 2009 he moved to Italy, where his father worked, and joined Lombardia Uno, a youth affiliate of professional club AC Milan. He spent a season with Lombardia Uno before moving to Pro Sesto.

Having been promoted to the Pro Sesto first team at the age of sixteen, he spent time on loan with Cernusco Merate and Legnano before joining FBC Varzi. In December 2018, having scored twelve goals in thirty-seven matches in the lower leagues of Italy, including three in fourteen Promozione appearances for Varzi, he was signed by Tunisian Ligue Professionnelle 1 club Stade Tunisien. He scored his first and only goal on 30 January 2019, in Stade Tunisien's 1–0 Tunisian Cup win against CA Bizertin.

Despite signing a three-and-a-half year deal with Stade Tunisien, he was released by mutual consent after just five months. Following his release, he returned to Egypt, signing with Haras El Hodoud on a three-and-a-half year deal. Having made his debut against Tanta, he suffered an anterior cruciate ligament injury in training, which kept him out for over three months.

After leaving Haras El Hodoud, Selim returned to Italy, signing briefly with former club FBC Varzi—though he was released after just a few weeks. A spell with Vis Nova in Serie D followed, before one appearance in the Eccellenza with Muggiò.

== Career statistics ==
=== Club ===
Appearances and goals by club, season and competition
| Club | Season | League | | | Cup | | Other | | Total | |
| Club | Season | Division | Apps | Goals | Apps | Goals | Apps | Goals | Apps | Goals |
|---|---|---|---|---|---|---|---|---|---|---|
| Pro Sesto | 2015–16 | Serie D | 1 | 0 | 0 | 0 | 0 | 0 | 1 | 0 |
| Pro Sesto | 2016–17 | Serie D | 1 | 0 | 0 | 0 | 0 | 0 | 1 | 0 |
| Pro Sesto | 2017–18 | Serie D | 0 | 0 | 0 | 0 | 0 | 0 | 0 | 0 |
| Pro Sesto | Total | | 2 | 0 | 0 | 0 | 0 | 0 | 2 | 0 |
| Cernusco Merate (loan) | 2016–17 | Eccellenza | 14 | 7 | 0 | 0 | 0 | 0 | 14 | 7 |
| Legnano (loan) | 2017–18 | Eccellenza | 6 | 0 | 0 | 0 | 0 | 0 | 6 | 0 |
| FBC Varzi | 2018–19 | Promozione | 14 | 3 | 0 | 0 | 0 | 0 | 14 | 3 |
| Stade Tunisien | 2018–19 | CLP-1 | 5 | 0 | 1 (Note: Appearances in the Tunisian Cup) | 1 | 0 | 0 | 6 | 1 |
| Haras El Hodoud | 2019–20 | Egyptian Premier League | 1 | 0 | 0 | 0 | 0 | 0 | 1 | 0 |
| FBC Varzi | 2021–22 | Promozione | 0 | 0 | 0 | 0 | 0 | 0 | 0 | 0 |
| Vis Nova | 2021–22 | Serie D | 7 | 0 | 0 | 0 | 0 | 0 | 7 | 0 |
| Muggiò | 2021–22 | Eccellenza | 1 | 0 | 0 | 0 | 0 | 0 | 1 | 0 |
| Career total | | | 50 | 10 | 1 | 1 | 0 | 0 | 51 | 11 |
