= Annals of Saudi Medicine =

- Discipline: Medicine
- Language: English
- Edited by: Prof. Nasser Al-Sanea

Publication details
- Former name: King Faisal Specialist Hospital Medical Journal
- History: 1981–present
- Publisher: King Faisal Specialist Hospital and Research Centre (Saudi Arabia)
- Frequency: Bimonthly
- Open access: Yes, no article processing charges and subscription fees
- Impact factor: 1.707 (ISI impact factor: Web of Science) (2021)

Standard abbreviations
- ISO 4: Ann. Saudi Med.

Indexing
- CODEN: ANSMEJ
- ISSN: 0256-4947 (print); 0975-4466 (web)
- OCLC no.: 12388567

Links
- Journal homepage; Online archive

The Annals of Saudi Medicine is a bimonthly peer-reviewed medical journal published by the King Faisal Specialist Hospital and Research Centre (Riyadh, Saudi Arabia). It was established in 1981 as the King Faisal Specialist Hospital Medical Journal and obtained its current name in 1985. Publication frequency increased from quarterly to bimonthly in 1988. The editor-in-chief is Nasser Al-Sanea (King Faisal Specialist Hospital and Research Centre).

== Abstracting and indexing ==
The journal is abstracted and indexed in:

- BIOSIS Previews
- CAB Abstracts
- CASSI
- CINAHL
- Current Contents/Clinical Medicine
- EBSCO databases
- Embase
- Excerpta Medica/EMBASE
- Index Medicus/MEDLINE/PubMed
- ProQuest
- Science Citation Index Expanded
- Scopus

According to the Journal Citation Reports, the journal had a 2021 impact factor of 1.707 and a 5-year impact factor of 2.057. The journal has been in the Thomson-Reuters database since 1997. In May 2019, the journal website converted to the Atypon Literatum online publishing platform.
