= Mohammed Salim =

Mohammed or Mohammad Salim may refer to:

- Mohammad Salim (born 1981), Bangladeshi cricketer
- Mohammed Salim (footballer) (1904–1980), Indian footballer
- Mohammed Salim (politician) (born 1957), Indian politician
- Mohammad Salim Al-Awa (born 1942), Egyptian Islamist thinker
- Mohammed Ali Salim, Libyan politician active in 2012
- Ramadhan Mohammed Salim (born 1993), Kenyan footballer
- Razaullah Nizamani or Abu Saifullah Khalid (died 2025), also known by the alias Mohammed Salim, a Pakistani Lashkar-e-Taiba militant and leader of its political front Pakistan Markazi Muslim League
- Ahmad Salim (Muhammad Salim Khawaja), Pakistani writer
- Md. Salim (judge), Bangladesh Supreme Court justice

== See also ==
- Mohammad Selim (died 2015), Bangladeshi politician
- Salim Mohammed (born 1946), Trinidad cyclist
- Mohamed Salim, Emirati footballer
- Mohamed Selim (disambiguation)
