= National Telecommunications Regulatory Authority =

Authority responsible for telecommunications and radio approval in Egypt

Coordinates: 30.067260°N 31.021605°E

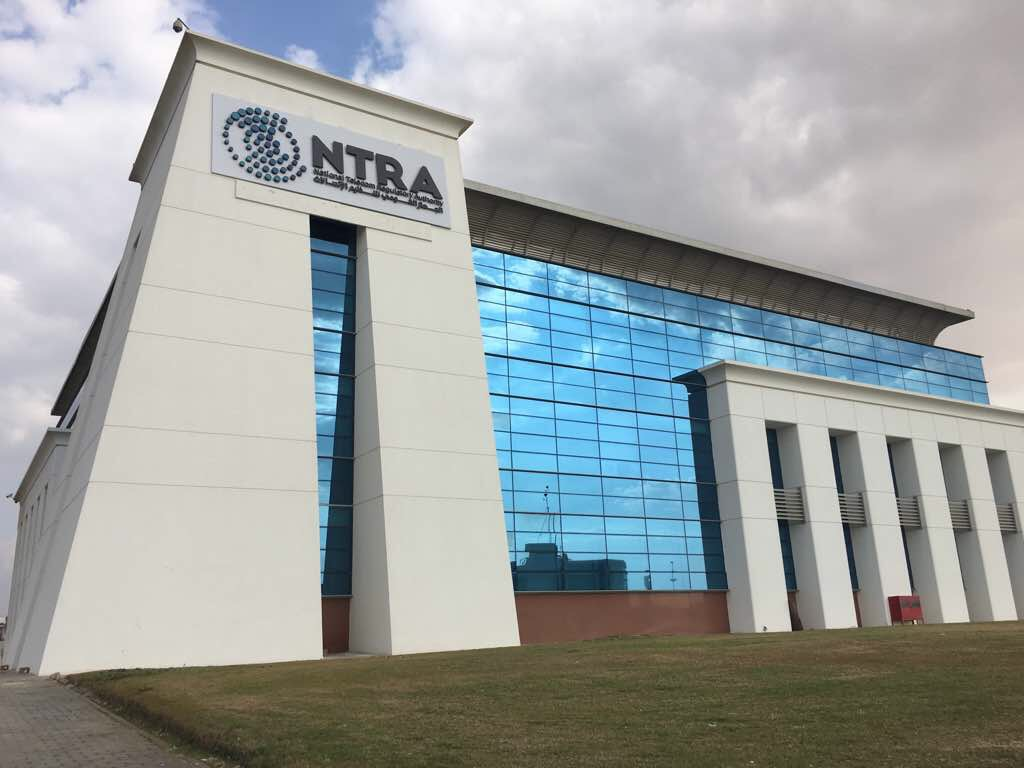
- NTRA main campus at Smart Village, Egypt
- Abbreviation: NTRA
- Formation: 29 December 2003
- Type: Statutory corporation
- Legal status: Established in accordance with the Egyptian Telecom Regulation Law No. 10/ 2003
- Purpose: Regulator and Competition Authority anticipate and lead the reform of the telecommunication market and develop the telecom industry.
- Headquarters: Cairo, Egypt
- Location: Nasr City, Alexandria, Ismailia, Smart Village, Egypt
- Region served: Egypt
- Official language: Arabic
- Chairman (President): Eng. Amr Talaat
- Executive President: Eng. Hossam El-Gamal
- Website: tra.gov.eg

The National Telecommunications Regulatory Authority (Arabic: الجهاز القومي لتنظيم الإتصالات, Al-Gehaz Al-Qawmy l-Tanzeem Al-Etisalat), commonly known as NTRA, is the Egypt government-approved regulatory and competition authority that was established in accordance of the Egyptian telecommunication regulation law No. 10/ 2003 as the national Authority equipped to regulate and administer the telecommunications region. Regulating the competition environment between the operators inside the industry according to the Egyptian constitution was a huge mandatory case after the huge rate of telecommunication technology growth, as well as ensuring the availability of qualitative and green telecommunications services.

The Egyptian Ministry of Communications and Information Technology (MCIT) corporations have supported the Egyptian constitutions rules through a selection of channels, of strong nationwide telecommunications infrastructure paved the manner for the development of a number of important telecommunications sectors.

== History ==
The awareness of the ICT strategic value increased by the governments around the world nowadays, the Government of Egypt (GoE) categorized the ICT sector as an important part of the national economy, because its innovative and creative potential and providing enabling services, high technologies and products that support the Egyptian economy development in the global market. In Egypt, during the last years, the achievements of this sector have emerge as felt in all spheres of existence as network infrastructure and the usage of ICT equipment have unfold. Egypt's ICT sector is now an important aspect of the countrywide economic system, a key driving force of development, and a catalyst for greater performance and performance throughout sectors. It helps to provide a competitive statistics and information and communications technology environment to improve the information society and financial diversification throughout fair law. as Egyptians increasingly more follow ICT tools in all areas of life, they are efficiently forging a digital society – to the advantage of people, commercial enterprise and society. In assist of this, MCIT focused on developing ICT talent levels, both to empower more people through access to the information society and to make certain a regular supply of human resources with the ICT capabilities required within the ICT zone and somewhere else.

Egyptian revolution of 2011

In Egypt, ICTs supplied the impetus for the 25 January Revolution, and round the world they have changed how the government's regulations are shaped and economies are run. The “communications revolution” as soon as proclaimed via academics and ICT experts is now a fact. In Egypt, furthermore, it has given upward thrust to a pioneering social movement that makes use of statistics and communications equipment to promote democracy and excellent governance. In Egyptian revolution of 2011, social networks including Facebook and Twitter provided an essential platform to a huge base of citizens, allowing them to take part in community talk based on fairness and transparency. MCIT is running to support this trend and to promote democracy, simply because it has constantly labored for the development of Egyptian society. The Egyptian regulator has been taking the lead in regions that force the development of the communications enterprise, as pursuant to the telecom law regulation no. 10/2003, it enjoys the juristic character and economic independence to be able to meet its mandates as set forth within the law. In the framework of those mandates, there is a seeks to improve its capabilities in ensuring the availability of telecom services to all areas all through the country, which includes the economic and developmental areas in addition to the urban, rural and far off areas, as well as, Assisting to create a healthy funding environment primarily based on fair competition and same opportunities standards. Also, growing and promoting suitable techniques and rules that enhance the infrastructure improvement and use of ICT services; presenting incentives to traders through the popular service fund to encourage them to offer far areas with the fundamental telecom services. and organizing the interconnection agreements among official operators with the intention to assure efficiency and honest internet working practices inside the telecom region.

== Scope of work ==
=== Policy and licensing ===
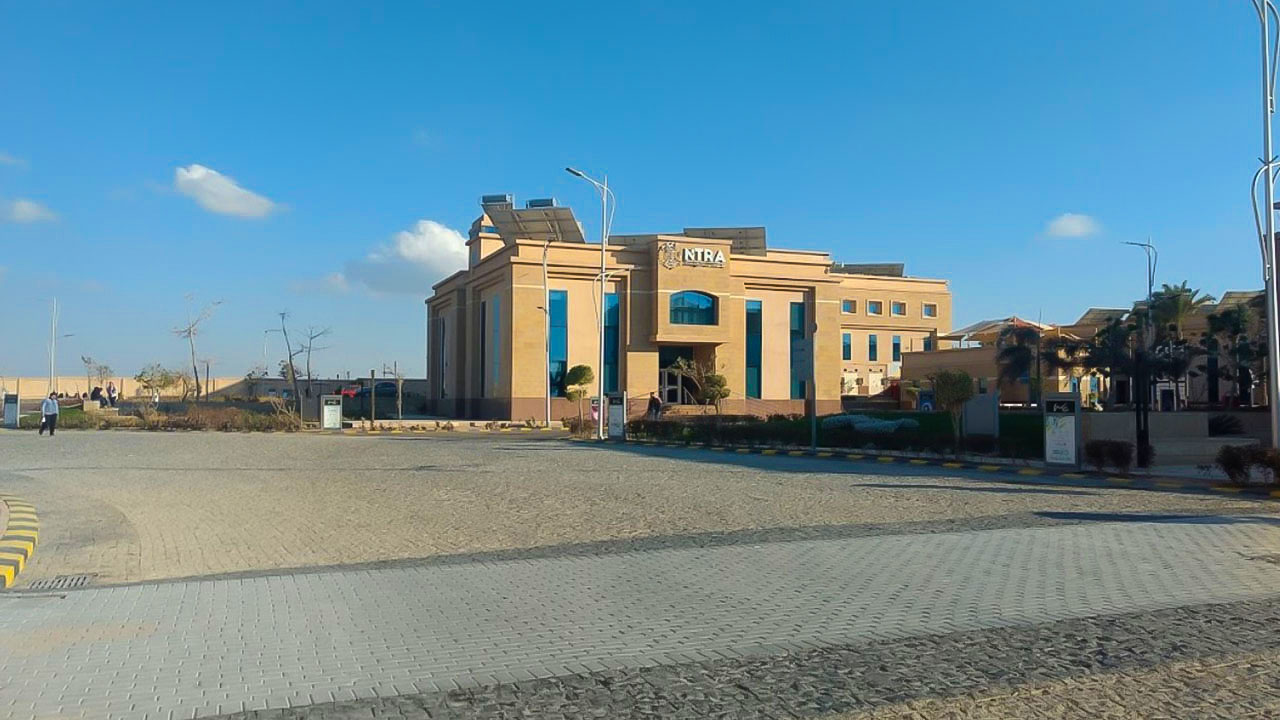
New Borg El Arab city branch.

The regulatory policy the national telecommunications plan make sure of the quality of the telecommunication networks and services are supplied at inexpensive fees for all citizens. Additionally, forming a licensing framework for liberalized offerings and developing a licensing system for networks and services covering character licenses and sophistication licenses for all telecommunication applications. Regulations were approved according to the Egyptian constitution; to prohibit anti-competitive practices, which include the misuse of a dominant role side, pass-subsidization, refusal to supply main facilities, vertical charge squeezing, misuse of data and restrictive agreements as well as planning to create an appropriate environment for the marketplace liberalization where there will be a free competition and investment. The government has approved the certified telecommunications operators in Egypt. The framework guarantees that everyone licensees are dealt fairly and in a non-discriminatory manner, and identifies the technical, industrial, legal and regulatory regulations had to make sure green and fair internet working practices within the telecommunication marketplace.

==== NTRA denies blocking voice calling services (Skype, WhatsApp and Viber) in Egypt ====
On 8 October 2015, a lot of Egyptian internet users could not be able to use voice calling platforms such as : Skype, WhatsApp, or Viber. Many reports claimed that VoIP calls were blocked in 2010 in Egypt, but apparently this was extended to add WhatsApp to the list during October 2015. Other conflicting reports about the Egyptian policy regarding blocking. However, official statements from NTRA deny blocking, but after complaining it was mentioned in the news paper that the decision were made by the NTRA. On 20 April 2016, the lawsuit forced the NTRA to announce the list of the websites that was blocked in Egypt; to divulge the criteria upon which they were blocked. On 12 June 2016, NTRA denied blocking Viber and other calling services although they are providing unlicensed international calls and are therefore illegal. NTRA claimed that they need to be licensed first, while denying any blockage at the same time.

On 30 March 2017, the same problem happened again and one of the mobile operators denied blocking the services; because the three main mobile operators cannot disable the VoIP services without NTRA approval. The National Telecom Regulatory Authority (NTRA) announced that the authority has nothing to do with this interruption and that it reassure again that news regarding this issue is incorrect. Many newspapers reported that the issue occurred because of "security" concerns, but there's also a suspicion there are economic incentives for local operators who have complained to regulators about free international calls. The partial disruption comes after terrorist attacks killed 47 people in two churches. The emergency law allows authorities sweeping powers including monitoring personal communications without judicial oversight and shuttering media outlets.

=== Frequency spectrum management ===
The national frequency spectrum development plan for the MCIT growth and optimizing utilization of the frequency spectrum according with worldwide policies. As a result, this will maximize the financial advantages of the frequency spectrum. Some other taken steps due to frequency spectrum management such as tracking the frequency spectrum in order to avoid harmful interference and assigning frequencies to clients without affecting national protection and defense, as well as having a frequency notification and registration. A worldwide coordination was created with the other nations on frequency spectrum usage through working within the pursuits of national defense and protection, and supporting regulation enforcement and crime prevention.

=== Research and development ===
The planning and development of the telecommunications zone in Egypt includes incorporating out technical researches, tracking new technologies and working to resolve technical difficulties. Researches on unique subjects were conducted by the NTRA, sometimes in cooperation with outdoor specialists and experts institutes, to be able to encourage funding and therefore make sure the availability of new services in the marketplace, as well as identifying and studying the key industry interpretation indicators to draw national and worldwide investment opportunities. and engaging in studies evaluation and economic interpretation of modern and newly introduced telecom services to make certain market liberalization and purchaser welfare. and assessing a cost model to make sure that telecom services price lists are price-oriented and to assure that services are in moderate price. (my ass)

== Industry ==
On 9 December 2003, there was a supervision institutes that run courses leading to internationally identified telecommunications certification, consisting of GMDSS, in step with regulations set through the involved establishments and growing curricula and examination structures; tracking the guidelines and technical progress of institutes; and growing policies for issuing, canceling or enhancing certificates. The MCIT followed the Ofcom in setting registration strategies of wireless devices importing businesses, submitting the organizations' Wi-Fi devices importation requests to the relevant committee as per the relevant regulation. and following up on keep report of the wireless devices through periodic inspections of these organizations, and following up at the movement and sale of such devices to make sure those organizations' abidance via the provisions of law. As well as making the strategies for getting the approvals required for the importation and utilization of Wi-Fi networks hubs, to make the decisions issued by the capable committee as according to the provisions of the relevant regulation regarding the clients' requests or utilization of Wi-Fi devices.

=== Licenses for equipment ===
On 9 June 2005, NTRA has mounted the customer support branch to create the registration methods of Wi-Fi devices importing organizations and to submit both the organizations' Wi-Fi devices importation requests to the applicable committee as according to the applicable regulation and the clients' requests regarding the addition of Wi-Fi devices, or frequencies to different utilization licenses or cancellations to the relevant particular Committee consistent with the relevant law. Imposing the procedures for acquiring the approvals required for the importation and utilization of Wi-Fi networks hubs. Rendering a choice regarding the clients' requests for the discharge of wireless devices, whether for private or public utilization (for entities) or for exchange (for the certified organizations registered with NTRA as an importer of wireless devices.

=== Numbering ===
According to Telecom regulation 10/2003, the national Telecommunication Regulatory Authority is the party accountable for the drafting of the national numbering plan and tracking its implementation. The national numbering plan stipulates numbering policies for fixed, cellular and unique services (Value added services, Internet, and Special Numbers) as well as new services. The national plan defines the regulatory and technical regulations relates to the formation, allocation, distribution, control of numbering. It elaborates at the commitments of each the NTRA in addition to the vendors and operators of telecommunication services. It is also differentiates between distinctive sorts of numbers.

=== Research and development ===
On 5 June 2007, the Research and Development branch was created to assist the national studies activities within the region of telecommunication, to maintain pace with emerging telecom technology and programs, and bridging the distance among educational activities and technical tendencies from one angle and policy visions and marketplace desires from another. Periodically announcing call for studies proposals on subjects in line with international developments and public needs. and taking part in and contributing to international conferences, meetings and standardization activities.

=== Wireless institutes ===
In line with the Telecom regulation No.10/2003, NTRA is liable for licensing and supervising the Wi-Fi institutes that qualify their attendees to enroll in the GMDSS certification tests of various levels. NTRA adopts the across the world authorized curricula and in line with the curricula described by means of the Ministerial Decree No. 259/ 2003, NTRA approves the coaching team of those institutes and supervises the academic technique as well.

== Leadership ==
- NTRA, Acting Executive President
- Scientific Societies, Consultants and University Professors (Committee Vice Chairman)
- Committee Rapporteur
- Telecom Egypt, First Deputy Chief Executive for International Affairs & Operators
- Telecom Egypt, CEO
- Middle East Telecommunications
- Systems Engineering Of Egypt (SEE)
- Multinational Companies - ADCOM
- Multinational Companies - CISCO
- Telecom Security - Expert
- Legal Sector - Expert
- (MCIT) - Head of Telecommunications & Infrastructure Sector
- NGOs - The Chamber's Communications Division

== See also ==
- Telecommunications in Egypt
- List of telecommunications regulatory bodies
- ITSPA
- ISPA
- International Telecommunication Union
- comporg
