= Smart Village, Egypt =

High-technology business district in the city of 6th of October, Egypt

Smart Village, Egypt القرية الذكية
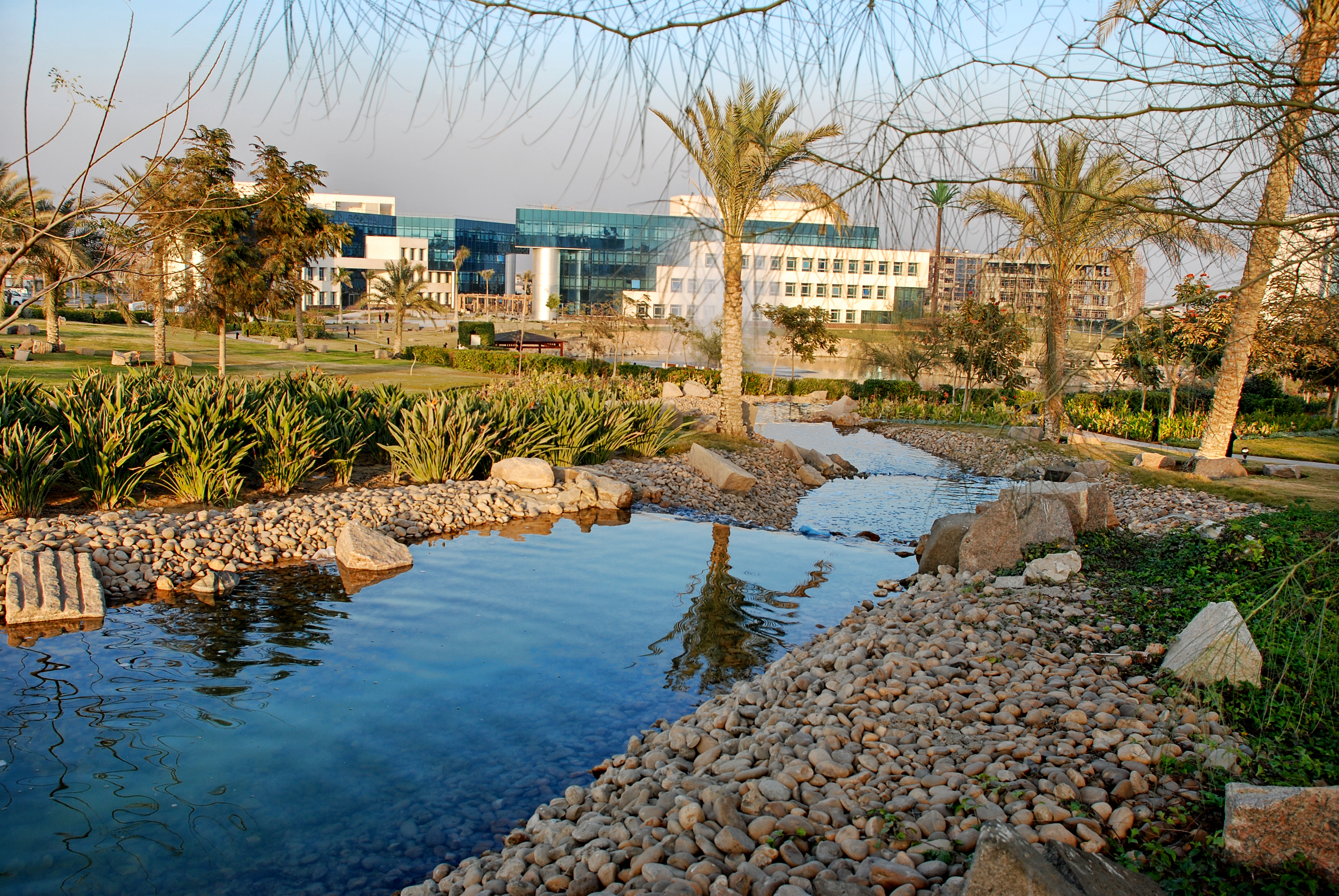
- A view of the Smart Village in 6th of October

- Seal

- Location in Egypt
- Coordinates: 30°03′N 31°0′E
- Established: 2001
- Time zone: EST

Smart Village (Arabic: القرية الذكية) is a high-technology business district in the city of 6th of October in Giza Governorate, Egypt, established by Presidential Decree no.355 in 2000, with activities starting in 2001. It is a business district with office buildings, retail shops, entertainment, factories and green spaces. It is located on the Cairo-Alexandria Desert Road, slightly west of Cairo, and occupies an area of 450 feddans. Its owned by Smart Villages Development and Management Company.

== Background ==
Hosni Mubarak signed the decree and provided the land for the building of Smart Village, in order for Egypt to build its IT economy and IT industry. Mubarak worked to get Microsoft, IBM and Cisco on-board. The 2001 decree gave companies in the Smart Village a ten-year tax break. The plan was to create several smart villages in Egypt.

== Tenants ==
The Smart Village contains government and ministry buildings, as well as private companies. The Ministry of Communications and Information Technology is located here. In 2012, the Egyptian Stock Exchange moved its administrative functions to Smart Village and has one of the largest buildings in the district, with a skyway connecting the two. In 2012, Research In Motion, makers of Blackberry moved their offices here and looked to hire Egyptian engineers. The Bibliotheca Alexandrina opened an Egyptology research centre in Smart Villages, in May 2018 and named it the Hawass Saqqara Training Centre. In September 2018, Raya announced it would lease a large space in Smart Villages. Raya specializes in business process outsourcing. Xceed, a subsidiary of Telecom Egypt has operations in the 6th of October Smart Village.

== Gallery ==
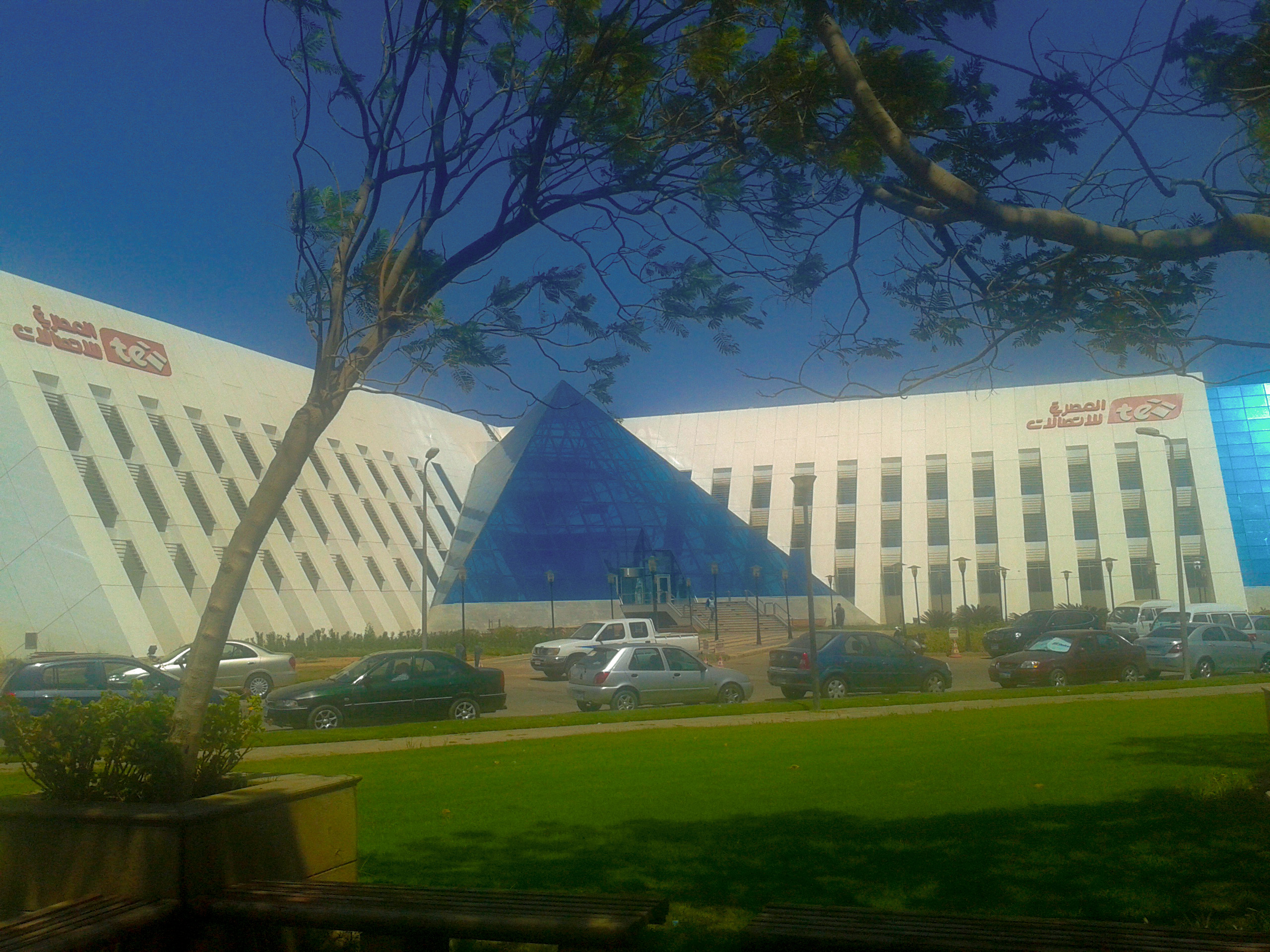
Telecom Egypt headquarters

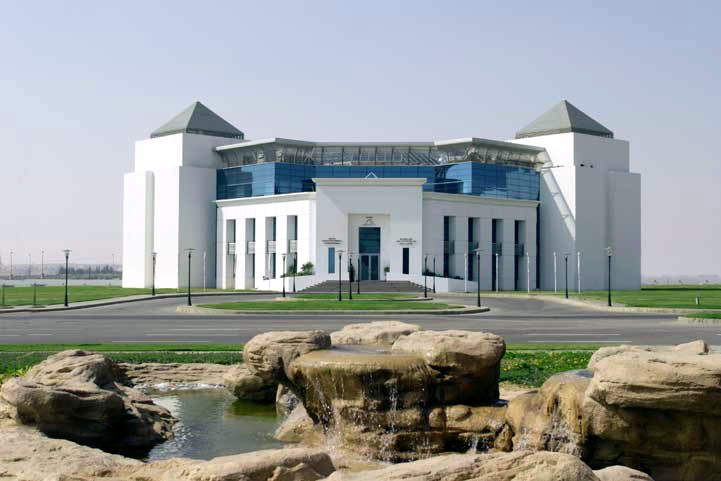
Center for Documentation of Cultural and Natural Heritage

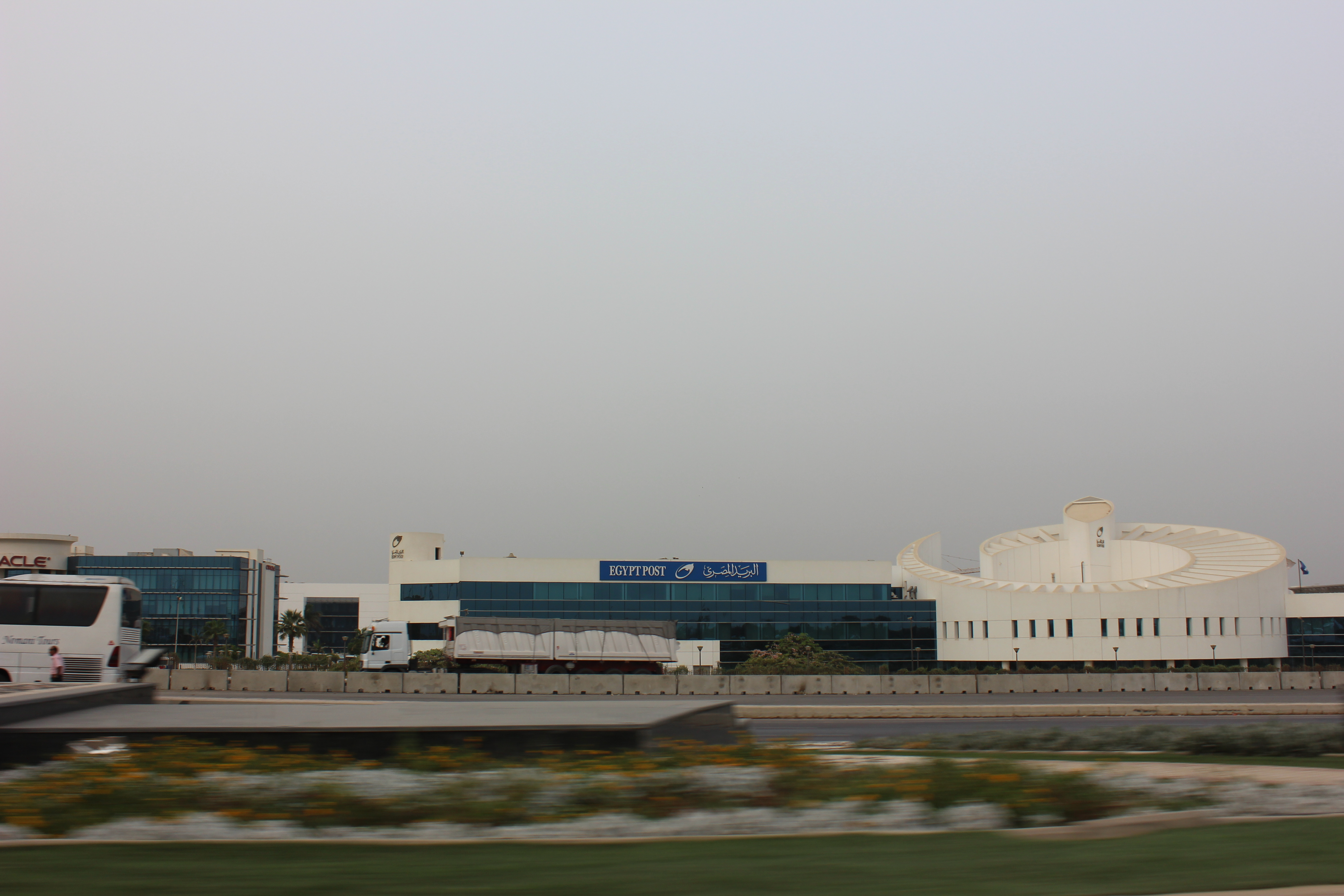
Egypt Post headquarters

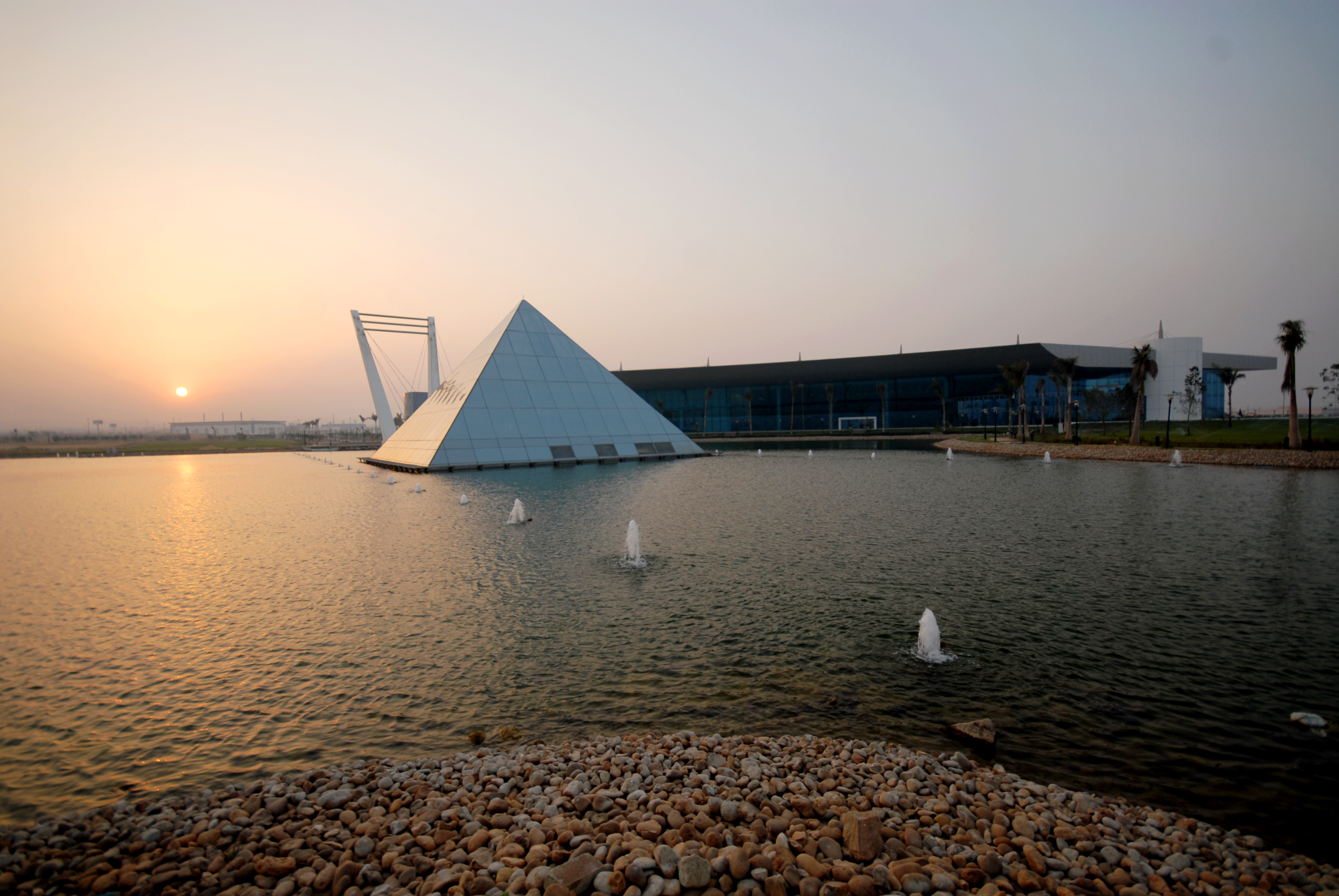
The Think Tank

== See also ==
- 6th of October
- Sheikh Zayed City
- Greater Cairo
- Downtown Cairo
