= Information Technology Institute =

Egyptian national university

- Motto: People develop countries, we develop people.
- Type: Public
- Established: 1993
- Affiliations: Ministry of Communications and Information Technology (Egypt)
- Chairperson: Heba Saleh
- Location: Egypt
- Website: iti.gov.eg/home

The Information Technology Institute (ITI) is a national institute established in 1993 in Egypt specializing in IT.

ITI was established in 1993 by the Egyptian Information and Decision Support Center (IDSC). It provides specialized software development programs to fresh graduates, as well as professional training programs and IT courses for the Egyptian government, ministries, and local decision support centers. This supports the government's objective of providing access and opportunity for all.

ITI opened a second branch in Alexandria in 1996 to create greater coverage of its services, and in September 2007 ITI opened two other branches in Assiut and Mansoura to maintain and assist in the spreading of its training services.

== ITI Management ==
The board of trustees of ITI is headed by the Minister of Communications and Information Technology. The board members include experts from the MCIT, academia, and information and telecommunication companies.
