= Egypt Post =

Governmental agency responsible for postal service in Egypt

- Native name: البريد المصرى
- Type: Government-owned corporation
- Industry: Postal services Banking; Logistics
- Founded: 2 January 1865
- Headquarters: New Administrative Capital, Egypt
- Website: www.egyptpost.org

Egypt Post (Egyptian Arabic: البريد المصرى El-Barid el-Maṣri) is the governmental agency responsible for postal service in Egypt. Established 29 October 1865, it is one of the oldest governmental institutions in the country.

== History ==
Modern Egyptian postal service began when Carlo Meratti, an Italian, living in Alexandria, established a post office to send and receive mail to and from foreign countries as early as 1821. Meratti took the responsibility of sending and distributing the letters for a price. He transferred his activity to Cairo and Alexandria through his office in Saint Catherine Square (formerly Qansal Square). After Meratti's departure his nephew, Tito Chini (who agreed with the importance of the project) succeeded his uncle with a friend, Giacomo Muzzi. The two partners upgraded the project, naming it the Posta Europea.

The post office began sending, receiving and delivering correspondence from the government and individuals, and the Posta Europea earned the public trust. At the inauguration of the first railway between Alexandria and Kafr el-Zayyat in 1845 the company established branches in Cairo, Atfe, and Rashid (Rosetta), followed by another two branches (in Damanhour and Kafr El Zayyat) in 1855. When the railway was extended from Kafr El Zayyat to Cairo (via Tanta, Benha and Birket el-Sab), the company exploited this opportunity and used the railways to carry the post between Cairo and Alexandria for a five-year contract beginning in January 1856. The contract was as a monopolistic franchise to transport the post to northern Egypt, where it stipulated a fine to be paid to the Posta Europea by anyone caught pilfering mail.

Khedive Ismaiel realized the importance of the Posta Europea and purchased it from Muzzi (after the departure of his partner, Tito Chini) on 29 October 1864. The Egyptian government offered Muzzi the position of general manager of the post and on 2 January 1865, the private Posta Europea was transferred to the Egyptian government. This date is noted as Post Day.

== Government administration ==
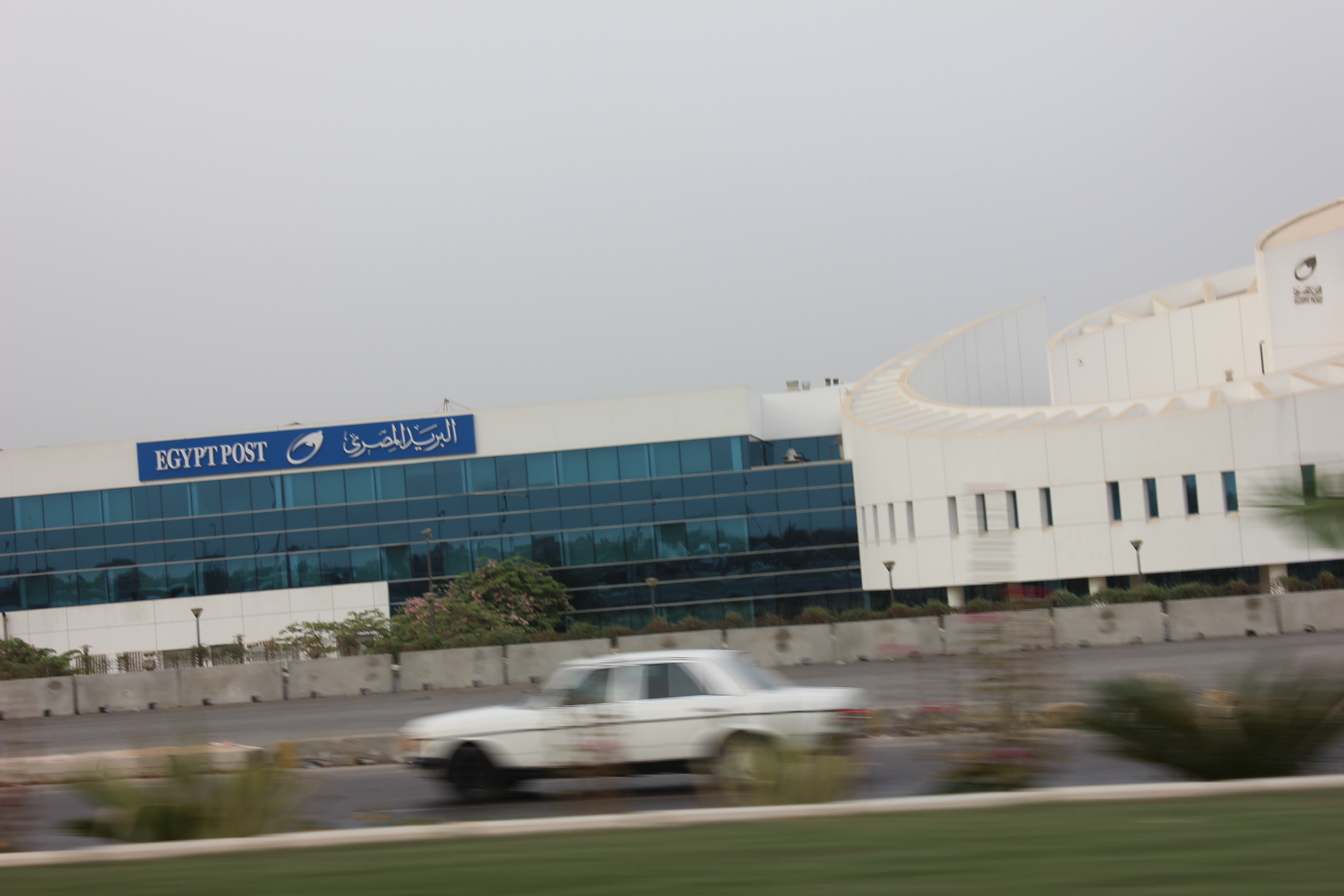
The Egypt Post building in Smart Village.

At its beginning, Egypt Post was affiliated with the Ministry of Occupations; it was then transferred to a succession of ministries, and in 1865 Egypt Post was attached to the Ministry of Finance. On 28 September 1876, Egypt Post was put under the purview of the Rulings Council Chief and the Ministers of Interior and Finance. On 19 May 1875 it joined the Ministry of Justice and Trade and the Ministry of Finance again on 10 December 1878. The regulations related to the organization of a post office was issued by the Ministry of Finance on 21 December 1865, stipulating that transferring mail and issuing post stamps was the exclusive job of the Egyptian government. In March 1876 a decree was issued for all post offices providing all employees with two uniforms: one for work and the other for ceremonies. The decree was amended to specify the model and type of the uniform.

In 1919, Law No. 7 was passed for the Ministry of Transportation appropriate the railways, telegraph, telephones, postal authority, ports, and road and air transportation. Comprehensive Law No. 9 was issued later to set fees for transporting the post and the postal-management headquarters was moved from Alexandria to Cairo, to its building in Al Aataba Square.

Since its establishment, the post (in addition to its regular postal activity) has sold salt and soda stamps (discontinued in 1899), steamboat tickets, debt and shares coupons, stamped paper, and telegraph and telephone service in return for fees paid to the Telephone Authority.

== 20th century ==
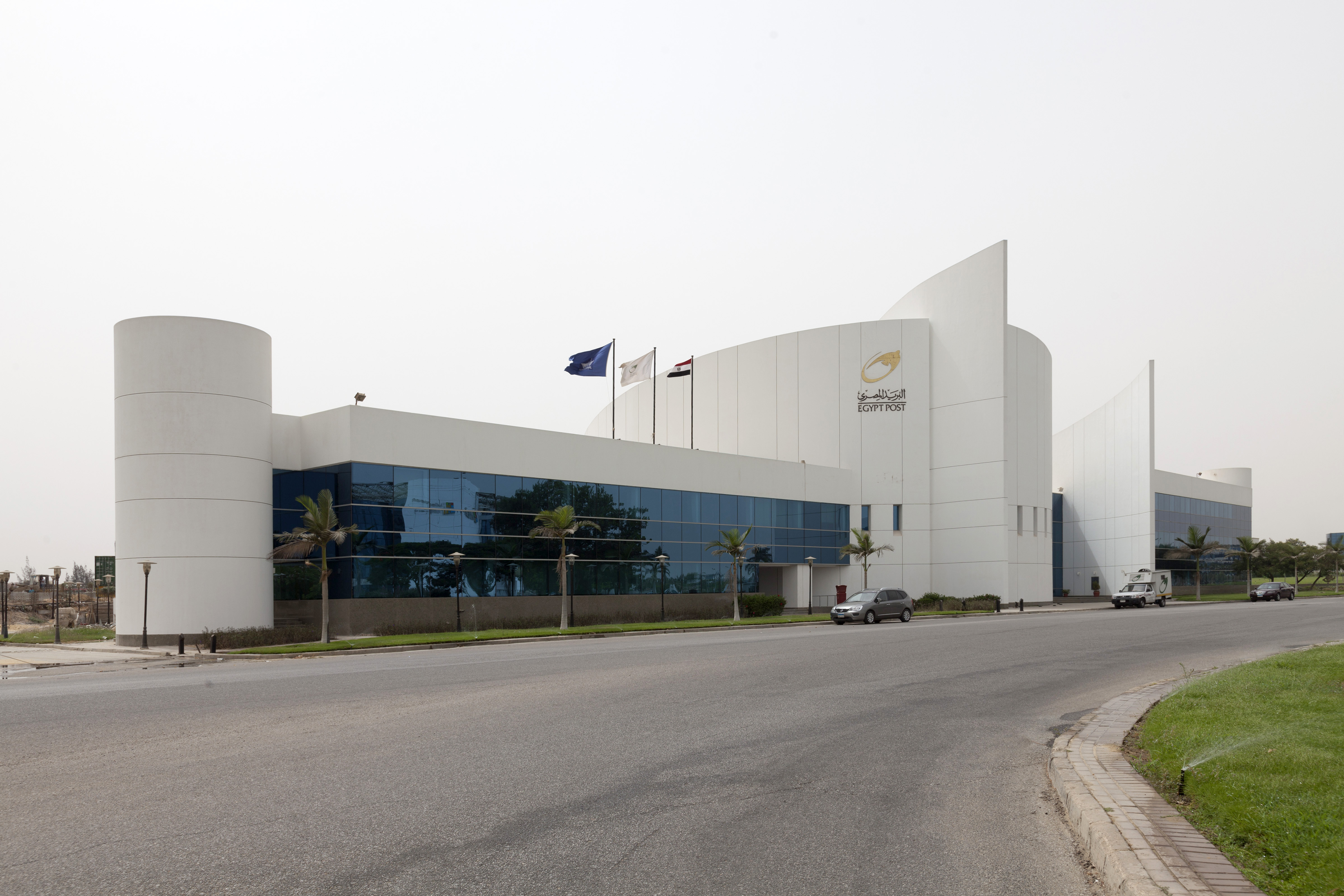
Egypt Post, Smart Village.

In 1934 the 10th conference of the Universal Postal Union was held in Cairo, on the 70th anniversary of the Egyptian Post. After the July 1952 revolution a separate budget was allocated for the post, giving it the right to direct its surplus revenues toward improving and boosting the postal service.

In 1957 Presidential Decree No. 710 was issued, establishing the Egyptian Post Authority to replace the previous postal authority. In 1959 the civil-services system (including local post offices and agencies) began, and in 1961 a secondary postal school was established by presidential decree. In 1965 the Institute of Postal Affairs was also established; in 1975, it joined the trade department at Helwan University.

In 1966 a presidential decree was issued establishing the General Post Authority to replace the Egyptian Post Authority, and in 1970 Law No. 16 was passed regulating the Egyptian post. 1982 saw the issuance of Law No. 19 establishing the National Post Authority, replacing the General Post Authority and attaching it to the Ministry of Transportation.

Ministerial Decree No. 70, in 1982, was a special regulation concerning Post Authority's personnel; Decree No. 55 that same year regulated the authority's finances. In 1999 the Ministry of Communications and Information Technology was established to supervise the National Post Authority, Egypt Telecom and the National Communications Institute.

== See also ==
- Postage stamps and postal history of Egypt
- List of national postal services § Africa
