= Telecom Egypt =

Egyptian multinational telecommunications company

Telecom Egypt S.A.E.
- Trade name: المصرية للاتصالات
- Native name: المصرية للاتصالات
- Type: Société Anonyme Égyptienne
- Traded as: EGX: ETEL; EGX 30 component
- Industry: Telecommunications
- Founded: 1854; 172 years ago
- Headquarters: Cairo, Egypt
- Area served: Egypt
- Key people: Lobna Helal (Chairman)
- Brands: WE
- Revenue: EG£82 billion (2024); EG£24.8 billion (Q12025)
- Operating income: EG£26.3 billion (2024); EG£10.2 billion (Q12025)
- Net income: EG£10 billion (2024); EG£4.6 billion (Q12025)
- Total assets: E£204.9 billion (Q1 2025)
- Total equity: E£46 billion (Q1 2025)
- Owner: Ministry of Communications and Information Technology (70%)
- Number of employees: 53,332
- Subsidiaries: WE
- Website: te.eg

Telecom Egypt (Egyptian Arabic: المصرية للاتصالات) is Egypt's primary telephone company. Founded in 1854 with the first telegraph line in Egypt, it is the first telecommunications company in Africa. In 1998, it replaced the former Egyptian National Telecommunication Organization (ARENTO).

The company has a fixed-line subscriber base in excess of 6 million subscribers. Telecom Egypt acquired TE Data (formerly GegaNet) in late 2001 to act as its data communications and ISP arm. The company has another IT arm, Xceedcc - Xceed contact center - located in Smart Village. Telecom Egypt also owns 44.95% of Vodafone Egypt. Telecom Egypt has adopted the contemporary quality integration trends and established the quality sector in 2001, which is now preparing the whole company to take the ISO 9001-2000 certificate.

Its main operational offices are in Cairo, Al Mansurah, Ismailia, Alexandria, Suez, and Tanta. On August 31, 2016, Telecom Egypt (TE) became a fully-fledged mobile operator after agreeing to pay E£7.08 billion (€713.14 million) for a 4G license. On September 18, 2017, Telecom Egypt launched its mobile service, branded as WE. In February 2019, Telecom Egypt signed a Memorandum of Understanding with Nokia for the development of 5G use cases in Egypt. Currently, Telecom Egypt is listed as number 3 in Forbes' Top 50 Listed Companies in Egypt 2023.

== History ==
=== Origins ===
The government initiative that later became Telecom Egypt started as a telegraph line between the Governorate of Cairo and the Governorate of Alexandria in 1854 built by the British Eastern Telegraph Company. Egypt's first telephone line was installed between Cairo and Alexandria in 1881. In 1881, the Egyptian government purchased the Eastern Telephone Company and created the Telephone and Telegraph Authority. Under Law No. 107 of 1957, all assets of the Eastern Company and other telecommunications providers were transferred to the Ministry of Telecommunications. In the same year, Presidential Decree No. 709 placed all wire and wireless communications under the jurisdiction of the Wire and Wireless Communications Authority which reported to the Ministry of Transport. The Arab Republic of Egypt National Telecommunications Organization (ARENTO) was established in 1980 as an autonomous public utility reporting to the Ministry of Transport. Via Law No. 19 of 1998, ARENTO has renamed Telecom Egypt and turned into a joint stock company over which the government maintained full ownership.

=== Telecom liberalization and Telecom Egypt ===
Telecom Egypt replaced ARENTO in 1998 and the Ministry of Communications and Information Technology was founded in order to develop Egypt's information and communications technology infrastructure. In 2001, Telecom Egypt established TE Data, a data and communications subsidiary. In the same year, Telecom Egypt was awarded a license to begin mobile operations in Egypt but declined. Instead, TE purchased an 8.6% share in Vodafone Egypt in 2003. Telecom Egypt gradually increased their holdings in Vodafone Egypt until the end of 2008, when their share was 44.95%. Today, Vodafone Egypt represents a significant source of revenue for Telecom Egypt.

In November 2005, the Egyptian government launched an IPO of 20% of Telecom Egypt's existing share capital. In 2006, the National Telecom Regulatory Authority (NTRA) deregulated Telecom Egypt's monopoly over domestic and international telephone service, and announced the potential for another fixed-line operator. This initiative was put on hold due to economic pressure, and Telecom Egypt is still Egypt's only fixed line operator.

Due to the government's 80% share in the company, Telecom Egypt is beholden to the Ministry of Communications and Information Technology (MCIT) for all major decisions concerning finances, tariffs and employment. The MCIT is seen by some to exert control over the National Telecom Regulatory Authority, leading to potential conflicts of interest.

In an interview published in May–June 2014, Telecom Egypt's CEO said that the company was awarded a unified telecoms license in April 2014, but he said that this would lead to a change in the relationship with Vodafone Egypt, in which Telecom Egypt has a stake of just under 45%. Telecom Egypt will be able to offer mobile services under the terms of the new license, he said, and will be using new 4G spectrum from 2015, and that would lead to a break-up of the relationship with Vodafone, by Telecom Egypt either buying the rest of the Vodafone Egypt stake or selling its stake to the Vodafone group.

== Products and services ==
Telecom Egypt is Egypt's only fixed-line operator, and one of the largest in the MENA region with over 9 million subscribers as of 2009. The company offers services in two categories, retail and wholesale. On the retail side, Telecom Egypt offers access and voice services for home and enterprises and data services through TE Data. TE Data had a 61% market share in Egypt in 2009 and also operates in Jordan. TE Data offers additional services through a collaboration with the Microsoft Live platform. Telecom Egypt is Egypt's only supplier of wholesale services. The company leases broadband capacity as well as national and international interconnection services in both data and voice. Telecom Egypt also provides infrastructure and transport services, voice and data services, and hosting. Whole services accounted for 42% of revenues in 2009. Telecom Egypt also offers mobile services through its stake in Vodafone Egypt. Overall, Telecom Egypt has a public monopoly over fixed landlines, provides 70% of internet service in Egypt, is the only provider of international phone service, and provides connectivity to all mobile operators. Though Telecom Egypt has recently applied to be a virtual network operator of mobile services in Egypt, perceived market domination might prevent a direct entry into the mobile phone market.

=== Retail services ===
Telecom Egypt offers fixed-line voice services and mobile through their partnership with Vodafone Egypt. They offer broadband internet and IPTV services as well as "enterprise-managed internet access, managed network services, and outsourcing of information and communication technologies services".

=== Wholesale ===
Telecom Egypt offers wholesale services to domestic and international customers. Internationally, Telecom Egypt is becoming a telecommunications and data hub between Asia, Africa, and Western Europe. The TE North cable, built in collaboration with Alcatel-Lucent, is a 40G undersea cable that connects Abu Tala, to Marseille, France, with branches to Jordan, Cyprus and branching units to be used for further expansion. It began operation in mid-2011.

== Subsidiaries and investments ==
=== Subsidiaries ===
- TE France - 100% Ownership
- TEData - 100% Ownership; "TE Data was established in 2001 by Telecom Egypt to function as its data communications and Internet arm." (MERIS)
- Xceed IT Consultancy and Call Center Operator - 97.66% Ownership (MERIS)
- Centra Technologies is a full IT system integrator and hardware manufacturing and Distribution - 58.76% Ownership; "Centra is a shareholding company established in ‘02." (MERIS)

=== Investments ===
- MERC (Middle East Radio Communication Company) - 49% Ownership; "MERC is a joint stock company that established in 2001. It is a leading company in the fields of building, operating and managing wireless communications stations."
- Technology Development Fund - 46.15% Ownership (Redirect to MoTIC Related Institutions Section)
- Vodafone Egypt - 44.95% Ownership
- Egypt Trust - 35.71% Ownership
- Ideavelopers - 18.75% Ownership
- Nokia Siemens Networks - 10% Ownership
- CITC (Civil Information Technology Company) - 10% Ownership
- Arab Company for PC Manufacturing - 10% Ownership
- Quicktel - 5.71% Ownership

== Controversies ==
=== 2011 shutdown ===
Just after midnight on January 28, Egypt's international data connections were shut down in 25 minutes. Telecom Egypt, as one of the five major network providers in Egypt, and the owner of "virtually all the country's fiber-optic cables" was instrumental in the government's shutdown. The government also used its hold over Telecom Egypt's infrastructure to leverage providers like Vodafone Egypt into shutting down their services. If these companies did not shut down independently, the reversal of the government's method of blocking their services would've taken more time to reverse.

In April 2011, a lawsuit was brought to the High Administrative Court seeking damages from three telecommunications companies (including Telecom Egypt) as well as current and former officials. The verdict eventually reached, which held accountable officials but not companies, stated that the internet shutdown had been practiced as early as April 2008, during the Mahalla Al Kobra protests in conjunction with telecom companies and ISPs in Egypt, and again in October 2010.

In addition to the shutdown, mobile operators' networks, including Vodafone Egypt's, were hijacked by the Egyptian government in order to send text messages directly to customers.

=== 2011 sit in ===
On October 12, 2011, five Telecom Egypt employees were detained by police and charged with attempted murder of the company's CEO Mohamed Abdel Rahim. According to protestors, the CEO visited the offices and employees gathered at his office to present demands associated with working conditions at Telecom Egypt. After he refused to hear their demands, they staged a sit-in in front of his office, which eventually ended when military police cut into his office from an adjacent room.

Protestors organized a protest and strike calling for the release of their co-workers. Telephone directory services and the Telecom Egypt service hotline were shut down in protest as well. The protestors claimed that Abdel Rahim and the board of directors were responsible for corruption and called for their resignation as well as the revision of high officials' salaries.

On October 23, 2011, the head of the independent workers union of Telecom Egypt, Mohamed Abu Karish, said that the prisoners would be released and disputed claims that workers threatened to shut down internet and communication services as an attempt to undermine the protest. Abdel Rahim withdrew his murder accusation and the detainees were set free on October 25.

== See also ==
- Vodafone Egypt
- Orange Egypt
- e& Egypt
- Telecommunications in Egypt
