= Vodafone =

British telecommunications company

Vodafone Group plc

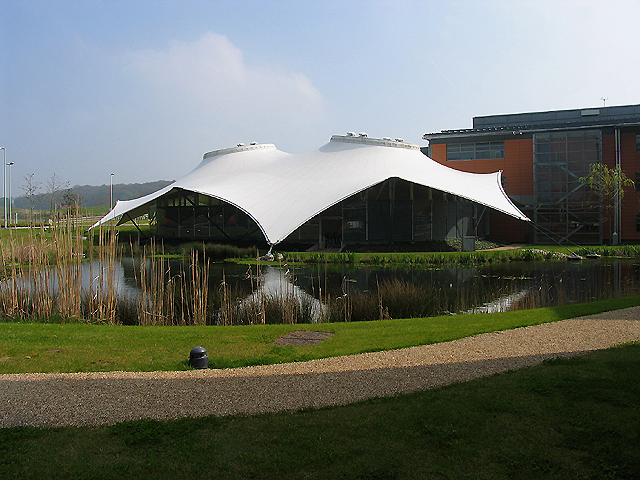
- Vodafone headquarters in Newbury
- Formerly: Racal Strategic Radio Limited (1984–1985); Racal Telecommunications Group Limited (1985–1988); Racal Telecom Limited (1988–1989); Racal Telecom Public Limited Company (1989–1991); Vodafone Group Public Limited Company (1991–1999); Vodafone AirTouch Public Limited Company (1999–2000)
- Type: Public
- Traded as: LSE: VOD; Nasdaq: VOD; FTSE 100 Component
- ISIN: GB00BH4HKS39; US92857W3088
- Industry: Telecommunications
- Founded: 17 July 1984; 42 years ago
- Founders: Ernest Harrison; Gerry Whent
- Headquarters: Newbury, Berkshire, England, UK
- Area served: Worldwide
- Key people: Jean-François van Boxmeer (chairman); Margherita Della Valle (CEO)
- Products: Fixed telephony; Mobile telephony; Broadband; Digital television; Internet television; IPTV; IoT
- Revenue: ▲€40,461 million (2026)
- Operating income: ▲€2,844 million (2026)
- Net income: ▲ −€49 million (2026)
- Total assets: ▲€129,918 million (2026)
- Total equity: ▲€54,365 million (2026)
- Owner: Vega (Xavier Niel family; c. 18.8%)
- Number of employees: 91,128 (2026)
- Subsidiaries: List: Vodafone Europe; Vodafone Albania; Vodafone Czech Republic; Vodafone Germany; Vodafone Greece; Vodafone Ireland; Vodafone Portugal; Vodafone Romania; VodafoneThree; Vodafone Idea India (VI) (13%); Vodafone Turkey; Vodacom (65.1%); Vodafone Egypt (55%); Safaricom (55%); Vodacom Tanzania; Vantage Towers (44.7%); INWIT (37.5%); TPG Telecom (23.7%)
- Website: vodafone.com

Vodafone Group plc (/ˈvoʊdəfoʊn/) is a British multinational telecommunications company. Its registered office and global headquarters are in Newbury, Berkshire, England. Founded in 1984 as a subsidiary of Racal Electronics, it launched the United Kingdom's second cellular network on 1 January 1985 and was demerged from Racal in 1991. Under Chris Gent, it became a global group through its merger with the American operator AirTouch in 1999 and the hostile takeover of Germany's Mannesmann in 2000, then the largest corporate merger ever. In 2013, it sold its 45% stake in Verizon Wireless to Verizon Communications for $130 billion.

Since the late 2010s, Vodafone has narrowed its footprint, selling its operations in New Zealand, Hungary, Ghana, Spain and Italy among others, to concentrate on a smaller number of markets where it holds a leading position. Germany is its largest market; in the United Kingdom, it has owned all of VodafoneThree since buying out CK Hutchison in 2026; and in Africa, it controls the Johannesburg-listed Vodacom. It also operates its own networks in Türkiye, Ireland, Portugal, Romania, Greece, the Czech Republic and Albania. In the financial year to 31 March 2026, it reported revenue of €40.5 billion. Since July 2026, its largest shareholder has been Vega, the investment company of the family of French businessman Xavier Niel.

As of August 2026, Vodafone operates networks in 17 countries, with partner networks in 42 further countries.

Vodafone has a primary listing on the London Stock Exchange and is a constituent of the FTSE 100 Index. The company has a secondary listing on the NASDAQ as American depositary receipts (ADRs).

== Name ==
The name Vodafone comes from voice data fone (the latter a sensational spelling of "phone"), chosen by the company to "reflect the provision of voice and data services over mobile phones".

== History ==
=== Racal Telecom: 1980 to 1991 ===
In 1980, Ernest Harrison, then chairman of Racal Electronics Plc – the UK's largest manufacturer of military radios – negotiated a deal with Lord Weinstock of the UK General Electric Company (GEC), which gave Racal access to some of GEC's battlefield radio technology. Harrison directed the head of Racal's military radio division, Gerry Whent, to explore the use of that technology for civilian purposes. Whent visited a mobile radio factory run by the US company General Electric (unrelated to UK GEC) in Virginia, that same year. In 1981, the Racal Strategic Radio Ltd subsidiary was established.

Jan Stenbeck, head of a growing Swedish conglomerate, set up an American company, Millicom Inc, and approached Gerry Whent in July 1982 about bidding jointly for the UK's second cellular radio licence. The two struck a deal giving Racal 60% of the new company, Racal-Millicom Ltd, and Millicom 40%. Due to concerns of the Government of the United Kingdom about foreign ownership, the terms were revised, and in December 1982 the Racal-Millicom partnership was awarded the second UK mobile phone network licence. Final ownership of Racal-Millicom Ltd was 80% Racal, with Millicom holding 15% plus royalties, and the venture firm Hambros Technology Trust holding 5%. According to the UK Secretary of State for Business and Trade, "the bid submitted by Racal-Millicom Ltd ... provided the best prospect for early national coverage by cellular radio."

Vodafone was launched on 1 January 1985 under the new name of Racal-Vodafone (Holdings) Ltd, with its first office based in the Courtyard in Newbury, Berkshire, and shortly thereafter Racal Strategic Radio was renamed Racal Telecommunications Group Limited. The first non-Vodafone employee to make a UK mobile phone call was comedian Ernie Wise, from St Katharine Docks, London on 1 January 1985. On 29 December 1986, Racal Electronics issued shares to the minority shareholders of Vodafone worth £110 million, and Vodafone became a fully owned brand of Racal.

On 26 October 1988, Racal Telecom, majority held by Racal Electronics, went public on the London Stock Exchange with 20% of its stock floated. The successful flotation led to a situation where Racal's stake in Racal Telecom Plc was valued more than the whole of Racal Electronics.

=== Vodafone Group: 1991 to 1999 ===
Due to stock market pressure, to realise full value for shareholders, on 16 September 1991, Racal Telecom was demerged from Racal Electronics as Vodafone Group Plc, with Gerry Whent as its CEO.

In July 1996, Vodafone acquired the two-thirds of Talkland it did not already own for £30.6 million. On 19 November 1996, in a defensive move, Vodafone purchased Peoples Phone, a 181-store chain whose customers were overwhelmingly using Vodafone's network, for £77 million. In a similar move the company acquired the 80% that it did not already own of Astec Communications, a service provider with 21 stores.

In January 1997, Whent retired and Chris Gent took over as CEO. In the same year, Vodafone introduced its Speechmark logo, composed of a quotation mark in a circle, with the Os in the Vodafone logotype representing opening and closing quotation marks and suggesting conversation.

=== Vodafone AirTouch: 1999 to 2000 ===
On 29 June 1999, Vodafone completed its purchase of American service provider AirTouch and changed its name to Vodafone AirTouch Plc. The merged company commenced trading on 30 June 1999. The acquisition gave Vodafone a 35% share of Mannesmann, owner of the largest German mobile network. To gain antitrust approval for the merger, Vodafone sold its 17.2% stake in Mannesmann's German competitor, E-Plus.

On 21 September 1999, Vodafone agreed to merge its US wireless assets with those of Bell Atlantic Corp to form Verizon Wireless. The merger was completed on 4 April 2000, just a few months prior to Bell Atlantic's merger with GTE to form Verizon Communications.

In November 1999, Vodafone made an unsolicited bid for Mannesmann, which was rejected. Vodafone's interest in Mannesmann had been increased by the latter's purchase of Orange, the UK mobile operator. Gent would later say Mannesmann's move into the UK broke a "gentleman's agreement" not to compete in each other's home territory. The hostile takeover provoked strong protests in Germany, and a "titanic struggle" which saw Mannesmann resist Vodafone's efforts. However, on 3 February 2000, the Mannesmann board agreed to an increased offer of £112 billion, then the largest corporate merger ever. The EU approved the merger in April 2000 after Vodafone agreed to divest the 'Orange' brand, which was acquired in May 2000 by France Télécom.

=== Vodafone Group: 2000 onwards ===
The headquarters of Vodafone Romania in Bucharest

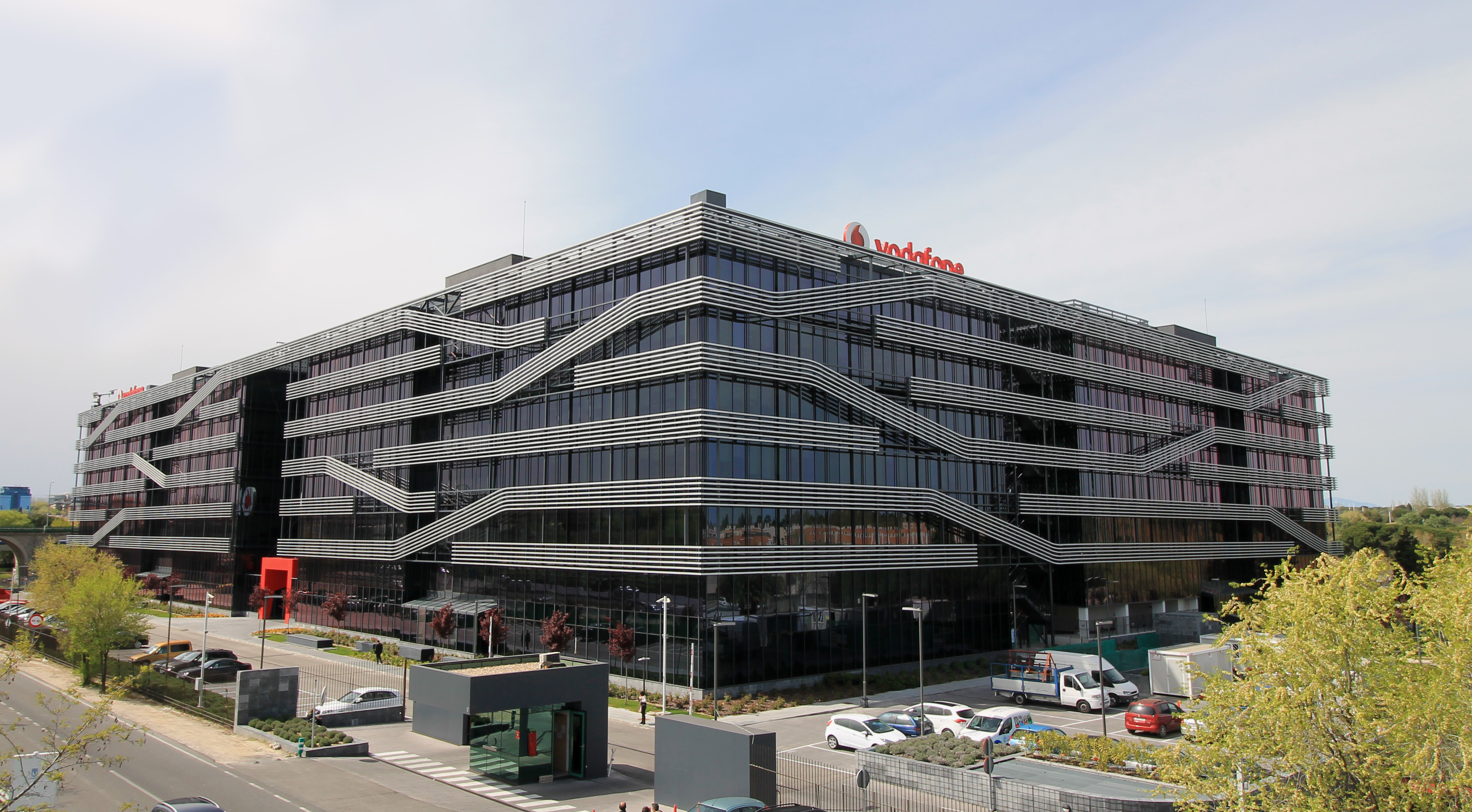
Vodafone office in Madrid, Spain

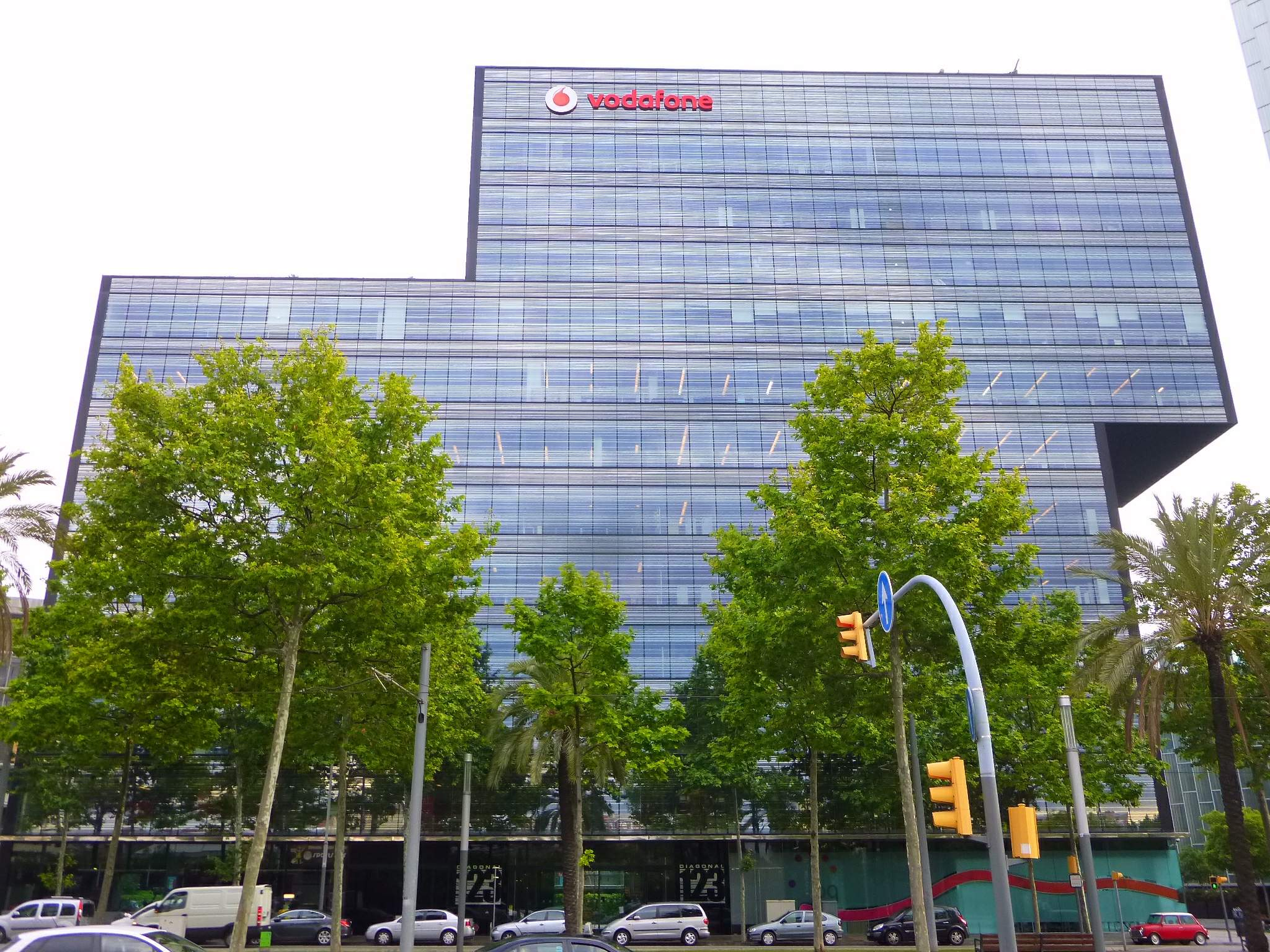
Vodafone office in Barcelona, Spain

On 28 July 2000, the Company reverted to its former name, Vodafone Group Plc.

==== Global expansion: 2000 to 2008 ====
On 17 December 2001, Vodafone introduced the concept of "partner networks", by signing TDC Mobil of Denmark. The new concept involved the introduction of Vodafone international services to the local market, without the need of investment by Vodafone, extending the Vodafone brand and services into markets where it did not have stakes in local operators. Vodafone services would be marketed under the dual-brand scheme, where the Vodafone brand is added at the end of the local brand (i.e., TDC Mobil-Vodafone etc.).

Under Gent and his successor Arun Sarin, who became chief executive in July 2003, Vodafone extended its footprint well beyond Europe. In Japan, it took control of the operator J-Phone, which it rebranded Vodafone Japan in 2003, before selling the business to SoftBank for £8.9 billion in 2006. It bought Turkey's second-largest mobile operator, Telsim, for US$4.5 billion in December 2005, and in February 2007 agreed to acquire a 67% controlling interest in India's Hutch Essar for US$11.1 billion. The pace of acquisitions came at a cost: in May 2006, Vodafone reported a loss of £14.9 billion, then the largest in British corporate history, after writing down the value of Mannesmann.

==== Verizon sale and convergence under Colao: 2008 to 2018 ====
Vittorio Colao, previously deputy chief executive, succeeded Sarin in July 2008.

In December 2011, Vodafone acquired the Reading-based Bluefish Communications Ltd, an ICT consultancy company. The acquired operations formed the nucleus of a new Unified Communications and Collaboration practice within its subsidiary Vodafone Global Enterprise, which was to focus on implementing strategies in cloud computing, and strengthen its professional services offering.

In April 2012, Vodafone announced an agreement to acquire Cable & Wireless Worldwide (CWW) for £1.04 billion. The acquisition gave Vodafone access to CWW's fibre network for businesses, enabling it to offer unified communications to enterprises. In June 2012, Cable & Wireless shareholders voted in favour of the Vodafone offer.

In September 2013, Vodafone announced it would be selling its 45% stake in Verizon Wireless to Verizon Communications for $US130 billion. With the proceeds from the deal, it announced a £19 billion Project Spring initiative to improve network quality in Europe and emerging markets, such as India.

Colao used part of the proceeds to build a converged fixed and mobile business in Europe, buying the German cable operator Kabel Deutschland for €7.7 billion in 2013 and Spain's largest cable operator, Ono, in 2014. In 2016, it merged its Dutch business with Liberty Global's Ziggo in a 50:50 joint venture, and in 2017 it agreed to combine Vodafone India with Idea Cellular to create the country's largest operator.

In June 2017, the company took measures to prevent its advertising from appearing within outlets focused on creating and sharing hate speech and fake news.

In May 2018, Vodafone agreed to buy Liberty Global's cable operations in Germany, the Czech Republic, Hungary and Romania for €18.4 billion. The deal was completed on 1 August 2019, giving Vodafone cable and fibre networks reaching some 54 million households in Europe; its chief executive described the enlarged group as "Europe's leading converged operator".

==== Retrenchment under Nick Read: 2018 to 2022 ====
Colao stepped down on 1 October 2018 and was succeeded by the group's chief financial officer, Nick Read, who had previously run its operations in Africa, the Middle East and Asia-Pacific. In 2020, Jean-François van Boxmeer, the former chief executive of Heineken, was named chairman.

In January 2020, Vodafone confirmed that it has pulled out of Diem Association (known as Libra Association at the time), the governing council for the Facebook-created global digital currency initiative.

Faced with heavy debt and a falling share price, Read began to sell or separate assets regarded as non-core. In March 2021, Vodafone floated part of its European tower business, Vantage Towers, in Frankfurt, raising about €2.3 billion. In November 2022, it transferred its stake of about 82% in Vantage Towers to a joint venture co-controlled with a consortium led by Global Infrastructure Partners and KKR, which launched an offer for the remaining shares. In December 2022, its African subsidiary Vodacom took over its 55% stake in Vodafone Egypt, and in January 2023 it completed the sale of its Hungarian business for about €1.8 billion to a consortium including the Hungarian state.

The period also saw the arrival of new strategic shareholders. In 2022, the Emirati operator Etisalat, which then traded as e& (it reverted to the Etisalat name in October 2026), built up a stake of 9.8%, later raised to more than 14%, and its chief executive Hatem Dowidar joined Vodafone's board in 2023. In September 2022, Xavier Niel disclosed a 2.5% stake held through his company Atlas Investissement.

In December 2022, Nick Read stepped down as Vodafone CEO, after overseeing a 40% share price fall during his four-year tenure.

==== Simplification under Margherita Della Valle: 2023 to present ====
The chief financial officer, Margherita Della Valle, took over as interim chief executive on 1 January 2023 and was confirmed in the role in April 2023. Presenting her first annual results in May 2023, she said the group's performance had "not been good enough" and announced 11,000 job cuts over three years, about one in eight of its workforce, along with a simpler organisation.

In June 2023, it was announced that Vodafone UK would merge with Three UK; Vodafone would own 51% of the combined company, and CK Hutchison Holdings 49%. Once approved by regulators, the merger created a group with 27 million mobile customers. On 3 July 2024, Vodafone and Virgin Media O2 announced they would extend their network-sharing deal into the mid-2030s, including a spectrum shift to aid Vodafone's $19 billion merger with Three UK, which faced a Competition and Markets Authority (CMA) investigation. The deal involved selling some of its combined 59% of the best 5G spectrum to Virgin Media O2, to address regulatory concerns about reducing mobile networks from four to three in Britain. Vodafone pledged a £11 billion investment in 5G if the merger was approved, asserting the merger would strengthen competition. In November 2024, the CMA provisionally concluded that the Vodafone and Three merger could go ahead, if both companies made price promises for consumers and committed to boosting the UK's 5G rollout.

In December 2024, the Competition and Markets Authority approved the merger of Vodafone UK and Three UK, forming the country's largest mobile network. Despite concerns about potential price increases, the CMA's approval was conditional on significant investments in 5G infrastructure and legally binding commitments to improve services. These included capping mobile tariffs and offering set contractual terms to mobile virtual network operators for three years. The CMA and Ofcom will oversee the implementation of these commitments, ensuring consumer protections are maintained. The merger was completed at the start of June 2025, creating VodafoneThree, the country's largest mobile operator. In May 2026, Vodafone paid CK Hutchison £4.3 billion in cash and took full ownership of the merged company.

In southern Europe, Vodafone sold Vodafone Spain to Zegona Communications for up to €5 billion, a deal completed at the end of May 2024, and Vodafone Italy to Swisscom for €8 billion; the latter transaction was completed on 31 December 2024 and combined Vodafone's Italian business with Swisscom's subsidiary Fastweb.

In June 2024, Vodafone Group sold an 18% stake in Indian company Indus Towers, raising $1.82 billion to reduce its debt. Initially planning to sell a 10% stake, strong investor demand led Vodafone to nearly double the sale. Bharti Airtel increased its stake in Indus to about 49% by purchasing around 1% of the shares. The sale generated 153 billion rupees and reduced Vodafone's stake in Indus from 21.5% to 3.1%. In November 2024, Vodafone Group announced plans to sell its remaining 3.1% stake in Indus Towers to Bharti Airtel for approximately $166 million (13.8 billion Indian rupees). The sale was part of Vodafone's ongoing strategy to simplify its portfolio and focus on core markets. The transaction was expected to be completed in the fourth quarter of the 2024 fiscal year, subject to regulatory approvals. In January 2025, it was announced that the remaining shares had been sold.

In February 2026, Vodafone sold its 50% stake in VodafoneZiggo to its partner Liberty Global for about €1 billion. In the financial year ending 31 March 2026, revenue rose by 8% to €40.5 billion, and the group returned to a pre-tax profit of €1.86 billion, while its loss attributable to shareholders narrowed to €397 million from €4.17 billion a year earlier.

In July 2026, Etisalat sold its entire holding in Vodafone, 16.2% of the share capital and 17.1% of the voting rights, to Vega, the investment company of the Niel family, at 110.5 pence per share, valuing the block at about £4.4 billion. Dowidar left the board, and Vodafone's shares rose by around 10% on the announcement. A few days later, Vega agreed to buy a further 2.74% of the voting rights, taking its holding to about 18.8% of the share capital and 19.87% of the voting rights; it said it intended to remain a long-term minority shareholder and ruled out a takeover bid.

== Operations ==
Following a period of worldwide expansion which began in 1999, in the 2010s Vodafone entered a period of retrenchment and simplification of its operations.

=== Africa ===
Networks in Africa
Majority-owned		Partner networks
DR Congo*	Egypt*	Ghana
Ethiopia*	Kenya*	
Lesotho*	Mozambique*	
South Africa*	Tanzania*	
* Majority stakes held through majority-owned Vodacom Group

==== Cameroon ====
On 23 September 2016, Vodafone extended its activities to Cameroon by signing a partnership with Afrimax, a 4G-LTE telecommunications operator in Africa. Vodafone Cameroon Launched a "Youth Program" in the Universities to support and encourage the Cameroonian students. The partnership ceased to operate in September 2017 following the withdrawal of its licence by the government.

==== Egypt ====
In November 1998, the Vodafone Egypt network went live under the name Click GSM, and was rebranded to Vodafone in 2002.

On 8 November 2006, the company announced a deal with Telecom Egypt, resulting in further co-operation in the Egyptian market and increasing its stake in Vodafone Egypt. After the deal, Vodafone Egypt was 55% owned by the group, while the remaining 45% was owned by Telecom Egypt.

On 29 January 2020, Saudi Telecom Company (STC) and the Vodafone Group signed a Memorandum of Understanding for the sale of Vodafone's entire 55 per cent stake in Vodafone Egypt to STC. With the sale, Vodafone would have exited the Egyptian market as a telecom operator. Telecom Egypt had said that it had no plans to sell its 45% stake. However, on 21 December 2020, Vodafone announced that it had failed to reach an agreement with STC regarding the sale.

In December 2022, Vodafone sold its shares in Vodafone Egypt to its majority-owned African arm Vodacom, for about US$2.4 billion; the Egyptian operator therefore remains within the group, held indirectly through Vodacom.

==== Ghana ====
On 3 July 2008, Vodafone agreed to acquire a 70% stake in Ghana Telecom for $900 million. The acquisition was consummated on 17 August 2008. The same group-led consortium won the second fixed-line licence in Qatar on 15 September 2008.

On 15 April 2009, Ghana Telecom, along with its mobile subsidiary OneTouch, was rebranded as Vodafone Ghana.

In February 2023, Vodafone Group has concluded the sale of its 70% stake in Vodafone Ghana to Telecel Group in a bid to streamline its African portfolio, thus exiting the Ghanaian market.

==== Libya ====
On 24 February 2010, the group signed a partner network agreement with the second-largest operator in Libya, al Madar.

==== South Africa ====
On 3 November 2004, the company announced that its South African affiliate Vodacom had agreed to introduce Vodafone's international services, such as Vodafone live! and partner agreements, to its local market.

In November 2005, Vodafone announced that it was in exclusive talks to buy a 15% stake of VenFin in Vodacom Group, reaching agreement the following day. Vodafone and Telkom then had a 50% stake each in Vodacom. Vodafone now owns 57.5% of Vodacom after purchasing a 15% stake from Telkom.

On 9 October 2008, the company offered to acquire an additional 15% stake in Vodacom Group from Telkom. The finalised details of the agreement were announced on 6 November 2008. The agreement called for Telkom to sell 15 per cent of its 50 per cent stake in Vodacom to the group, and demerge the other 35 per cent to its shareholders. Meanwhile, Vodafone agreed to make Vodacom its exclusive sub-Saharan Africa investment vehicle, as well as continuing to maintain the visibility of the Vodacom brand. The transaction closed in May/June 2009.

On 18 May 2009, Vodacom entered the JSE Limited stock exchange in South Africa after Vodafone increased its stake by 15% to 65% to take a majority holding, despite disputes by local trade unions.

In April 2011, Vodacom rebranded with the Vodafone logo.

=== Middle East ===
Networks in the Middle East
Partner networks
Oman
Qatar

==== Bahrain ====
In December 2003, Vodafone signed a Partner Network Agreement with Kuwait's Mobile Telecommunications Company (MTC), enabling cooperation in Bahrain and leading to the branding of the Bahraini network as MTC-Vodafone. MTC later rebranded regionally as Zain, and the Bahraini operation subsequently became Zain Bahrain. As part of the early partnership structure, Vodafone held a 6.25% minority stake in Zain Bahrain; however, in May 2014 Vodafone sold its entire 6.25% stake to Zain Group for US$12.5 million, fully ending its equity involvement in the company.

==== Oman ====
In January 2021, Vodafone obtained a licence to establish and operate public telecommunications services in Oman. In September 2021 Vodafone in Oman signed an agreement with Ericsson to deploy, operate and maintain 4G and 5G core and radio access (RAN) greenfield network and an agreement with Netcracker Technology to deploy Netcracker Digital BSS. Vodafone will be the third operator in the Sultanate of Oman.

==== Qatar ====
In December 2007, a Vodafone Group-led consortium was awarded the second mobile phone licence in Qatar under the name "Vodafone Qatar". Vodafone Qatar is located at QSTP, the Qatar Science & Technology Park. Commercial operations officially began on 1 March 2009. In February 2018 Vodafone Europe agreed to sell their stake in the Qatar joint venture.

On 25 November 2019, Vodafone in collaboration with Inseego Corp. introduced the 5G MiFi M1100 in Qatar. It was the first commercially available 5G mobile hotspot in the region.

==== United Arab Emirates ====
On 28 January 2009, the group announced a partner network agreement with Du, the second-largest operator in the United Arab Emirates. The agreement involved co-operation on international clients, handset procurement, mobile broadband etc.

=== The Americas ===
Networks in the Americas
Partner networks
Canada
Chile
Dominican Republic
Peru
United States

Canada

Vodafone's network partner in Canada was Rogers Wireless but has since changed to Telus.

Chile

On 11 May 2008, Vodafone sealed a trade agreement with the Chilean Entel, in which Entel has access to the equipment and international services of Vodafone, and Vodafone will be one of the trademarks of Entel for the wireless business. This step will give the Vodafone brand access to a market of over 15 million people, currently divided between two companies: Telefonica Movistar and Entel.

Brazil

In August 2013, Vodafone has started the MVNO operation in Brazil, as a corporative M2M operator.

United States

In the United States, Vodafone previously owned 45% of Verizon Wireless in a joint venture with Verizon Communications, the country's largest mobile carrier. Vodafone branding was not used, however, as the CDMA network was not compatible with the GSM 900/1800 MHz standard used by Vodafone's other networks and as Vodafone did not have management control over Verizon Wireless. On 2 September 2013 Vodafone announced the sale of its stake to Verizon Communications for around $130 billion. In 2004, Vodafone made an unsuccessful bid for the entirety of AT&T Wireless; however, Cingular Wireless, at the time a joint venture of SBC Communications and BellSouth (both now part of AT&T Inc.), outbid Vodafone and took control of AT&T Wireless (the combined wireless carrier is now AT&T Mobility).

In 2013, Vodafone was considered for acquisition by US-based AT&T. Ultimately, the deal did not move forward.

=== Asia ===
Networks in Asia
Joint venture	Partner networks
India	Hong Kong
	Japan
	Singapore
	Taiwan

==== India ====
On 28 October 2005, the company announced the acquisition of a 10 per cent stake in India's Bharti Enterprises, which operated the largest mobile phone network in India under the brand name Airtel. Then on 11 February 2007, the Company agreed to acquire a controlling interest of 67% in Hutch Essar for US$11.1 billion. At the same time, it agreed to sell back 5.6% of its Airtel stake to the Mittals; Vodafone would retain a 4.4% stake in Airtel. On 21 September 2007, Hutch was rebranded to Vodafone India. In May 2011, Vodafone Group Plc bought the remaining shares of Vodafone Essar from Essar Group Ltd for $5 billion. In October 2013, it was reported by Reuters that Vodafone planned to invest as much as $2 billion (£1.2 billion) to buy out minority shareholders in Vodafone India.

By late January 2017, Vodafone Group's unit in India and Idea Cellular Ltd were in preliminary talks to merge. On 20 March 2017, Vodafone announced that it was merging its Indian business with Idea, India's third-largest network, to create the country's third-largest operator with almost 270 million customers, accounting for 16% of the Indian cellphone market. Vodafone would own 45.1 per cent of the new operator and Idea's parent company, the Aditya Birla Group, 26 per cent. The deal valued Vodafone India at the equivalent of $12.6 billion and Idea Cellular at the equivalent of $11.02 billion. The deal would enable Vodafone to move its Indian subsidiary off its balance sheet, cutting the British group's net debt by the equivalent of almost $8.25 billion. The Telecom ministry (DoT) cleared the Vodafone–Idea merger on 9 July 2018. On 31 August 2018, Vodafone Idea became a legal entity and the largest telecom service provider in India. On 7 September 2020, Vodafone Idea unveiled its new brand identity, 'Vi' which involves the integration of the company's separate brands 'Vodafone' and 'Idea' into one unified brand.

==== Japan ====
In 1999, J-Phone launched the J-sky mobile Internet service in response to DoCoMo's i-Mode service. It became Japan's third-largest mobile operator and was the first one to introduce camera phones in Japan. Vodafone then went on to acquire J-phone. In December 2002 J-Phone's 3G network went live. On 1 October 2003, J-Phone became 'Vodafone Japan', and J-Phone's mobile internet service J-Sky became Vodafone Live!. On 17 March 2006, Vodafone announced an agreement to sell all its interest in Vodafone Japan to SoftBank for £8.9 billion, of which £6.8 billion would be received in cash upon completion of the deal. In October 2006, SoftBank changed Vodafone Japan's name to 'SoftBank Mobile'. In November 2010, Vodafone divested its remaining SoftBank shares.

==== Other Asia ====
On 3 November 2003, Singapore became a part of the community as M1 was signed as partner network. Then in April 2005, SmarTone changed the name of its brand to 'SmarTone-Vodafone', after both companies signed a Partner Network Agreement. In January 2006, Indonesia, Malaysia, and Sri Lanka were added to the Vodafone footprint as Vodafone Group signed a partner network agreement with Telekom Malaysia. On 6 February 2007, along with the partnership with Digicel Caribbean (see below), Samoa was added as a Partner Market. On 6 February 2007, Vodafone Group signed a three-year partnership agreement with Digicel Group. The agreement, which included Digicel's operation in Samoa, would result in new roaming capabilities.

On 10 February 2008, Vodafone announced the launch of M-Paisa mobile money transfer service on Roshan's (Afghanistan's largest GSM operator) network.

dtac in Thailand was signed as a partner network of the Group on 25 March 2009.

Chunghwa Telecom of Taiwan was signed as a partner network on 12 November 2009.

In September 2011, it was announced that Vodafone and Smartone would not renew their partnership in the Hong Kong market. Vodafone instead entered into an agreement with Hutchison Telecom, who operate the 3 brand. In the same year, M1 also ended their partnership in Singapore.

In February 2013, Vodafone together with China Mobile participated in bidding for one of the two newly opened Myanmar Mobile licences.

At the beginning of September 2014, the Vietnamese mobile operator Vinaphone signed a strategic co-operation agreement with Vodafone.

=== Europe ===
Networks in Europe
Majority/minority-owned		Partner networks			
Albania	Czech Republic	Austria	Azerbaijan	Bahrain	Belgium
Germany	Greece	Bulgaria	Channel Islands	Croatia	Cyprus
Ireland		Denmark	Estonia	Finland	France
Northern Cyprus (indirectly owned)	Portugal	Georgia	Hungary	Iceland	Italy
Romania	Turkey	Latvia	Lithuania	Luxembourg	Netherlands
United Kingdom		North Macedonia	Poland	Serbia	Slovenia
		Spain	Sweden	Switzerland	Ukraine

Vodafone Magyarország Zrt ("Vodafone Hungary") was formed as a subsidiary company in July 1999, although Vodafone has since sold its shares in the company. The acquisition of Mannesmann AG, completed on 12 April 2000, creating subsidiaries in Germany and Italy, and increased the Group's indirect holding in SFR. The Vodafone brand in Italy was introduced as Omnitel Vodafone in 2001, which became Vodafone Omnitel in 2002; finally the current name Vodafone Italy was introduced in 2003, dropping Omnitel altogether.

In 2001, the company acquired Eircell, the largest wireless communications company in Ireland, from Eircom. Eircell was subsequently rebranded as Vodafone Ireland. In February 2002, Radiolinja of Finland joined Vodafone as a partner network. Later in December 2002, the Vodafone brand was introduced in the Estonian market following the signing of a Partner Network Agreement with the Estonian subsidiary of Radiolinja. Radiolinja's Finnish service was rebranded as Elisa in April 2004 following its parent company Elisa Corporation's decision to unify all consumer-facing brands under a single name; this was followed by Radiolinja's Estonian service in February 2005, in anticipation of the later juridical merger with Uninet.

In January 2003, the company signed a group-wide partner agreement with mobilkom Austria and as a result Austria, Bulgaria, Croatia and Slovenia were added to the community. In April 2003, Og Vodafone was introduced in the Icelandic market. On 21 July 2003, Lithuania was added to the community, with the signing of a Partner Network Agreement with Bitė.

In February 2004, Vodafone signed Partner Network Agreements with Luxembourg's LuxGSM, and with Cyta in Cyprus. Cyta agreed to rename its mobile phone operations to Cytamobile-Vodafone. In April 2004, the company acquired a British airtime provider, Singlepoint, for £405m from John Caudwell's Caudwell Group, adding approximately 1.5 million customers and sites in Stoke-on-Trent to existing sites in Newbury (HQ), Birmingham, Warrington and Banbury. In November 2004, Vodafone introduced 3G services into Europe.

In June 2005, the Company bought the Czech mobile operator Oskar which was rebranded as Oskar-Vodafone.

On 28 October 2005, Connex in Romania was rebranded as Connex-Vodafone, and on 31 October 2005, the company reached an agreement to sell Vodafone Sweden to Telenor for approximately €1 billion. After the sale, Vodafone Sweden became a partner network.

In December 2005, Vodafone won a bid to buy Turkey's second-largest mobile phone company, Telsim, for US$4.5 billion. Early in January 2007, Telsim in Turkey adopted Vodafone dual branding as Telsim Vodafone, and on 1 April 2007, became Vodafone Turkey. In addition, Vodafone Turkey also provides service in Northern Cyprus.

In 2006, the Company rebranded its Stoke-on-Trent site to Stoke Premier Centre, a "centre of expertise" for the company dealing with customer care for its higher-value customers, technical support, sales and credit control. On 22 February 2006, the company announced that it was extending its footprint to Bulgaria with the signing of Partner Network Agreement with Mobiltel, which is part of the mobilkom Austria group.

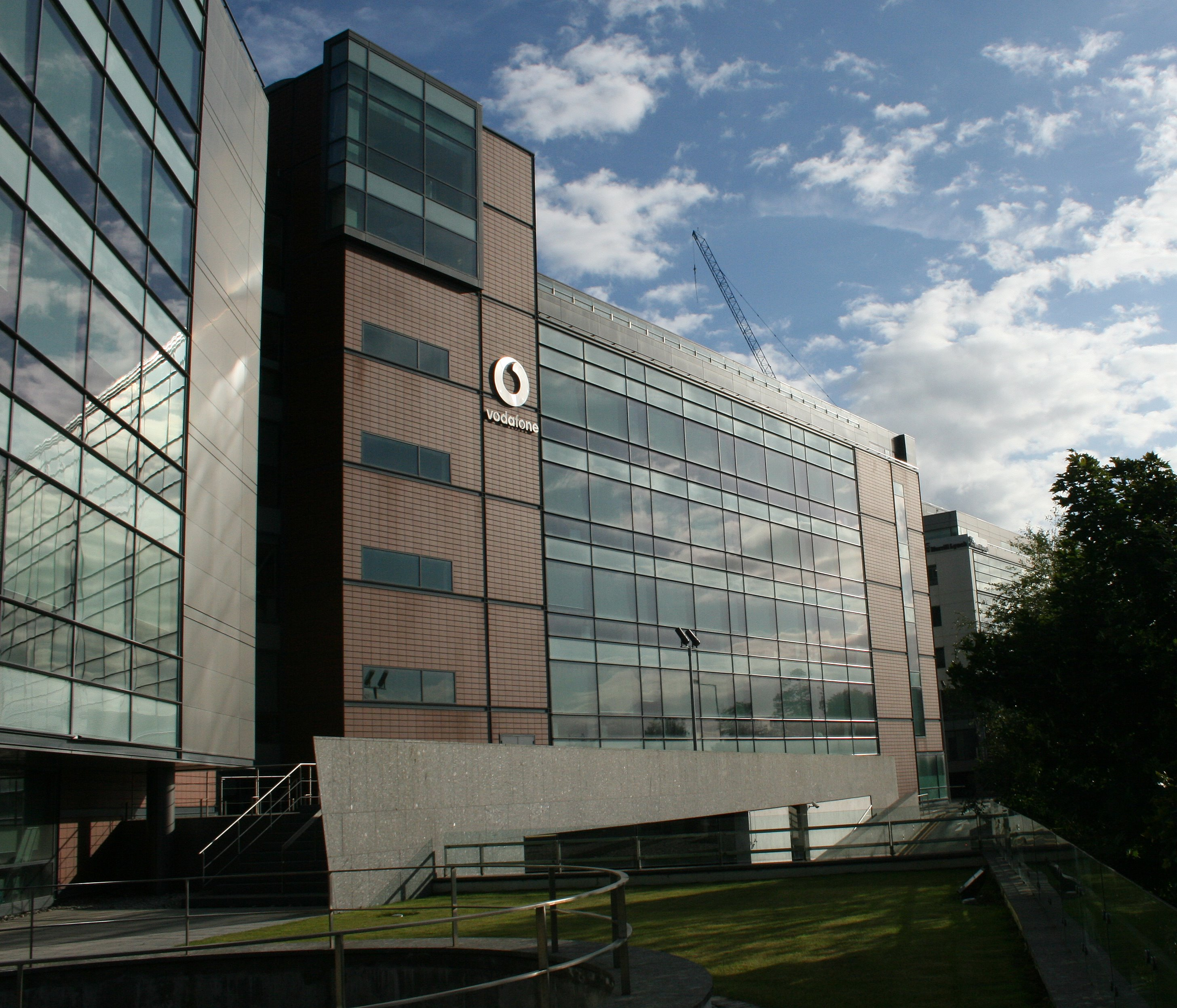
The headquarters of Vodafone Ireland in Dublin

In April 2006, the company announced that it had signed an extension to its Partner Network Agreement with Bitė Group, enabling its Latvian subsidiary Bite Latvija to become the latest member of Vodafone's global partner community. On 30 May 2006, Vodafone announced the then-biggest loss in British corporate history (£14.9 billion), and that they planned to cut 400 jobs; it reported one-off costs of £23.5 billion due to the revaluation of its Mannesmann subsidiary. On 24 July 2006, the head of Vodafone Europe, Bill Morrow, quit unexpectedly, and on 25 August 2006, the company announced the sale of its 25% stake in Belgium's Proximus for €2 billion. After the deal, Proximus remained part of the community as a Partner Network.

On 5 October 2006, Vodafone announced the first single-brand partnership with Og Vodafone which would operate under the name Vodafone Iceland, and on 19 December 2006, the company announced the sale of its 25% stake in Switzerland's Swisscom for CHF4.25 billion (£1.8 billion). After the deal, Swisscom would still be part of the community as a Partner Network. In December 2006, the Company completed the acquisition of Aspective, an enterprise applications systems integrator in the UK, signalling Vodafone's intent to grow a significant presence and revenues in the information and communication technologies (ICT) marketplace.

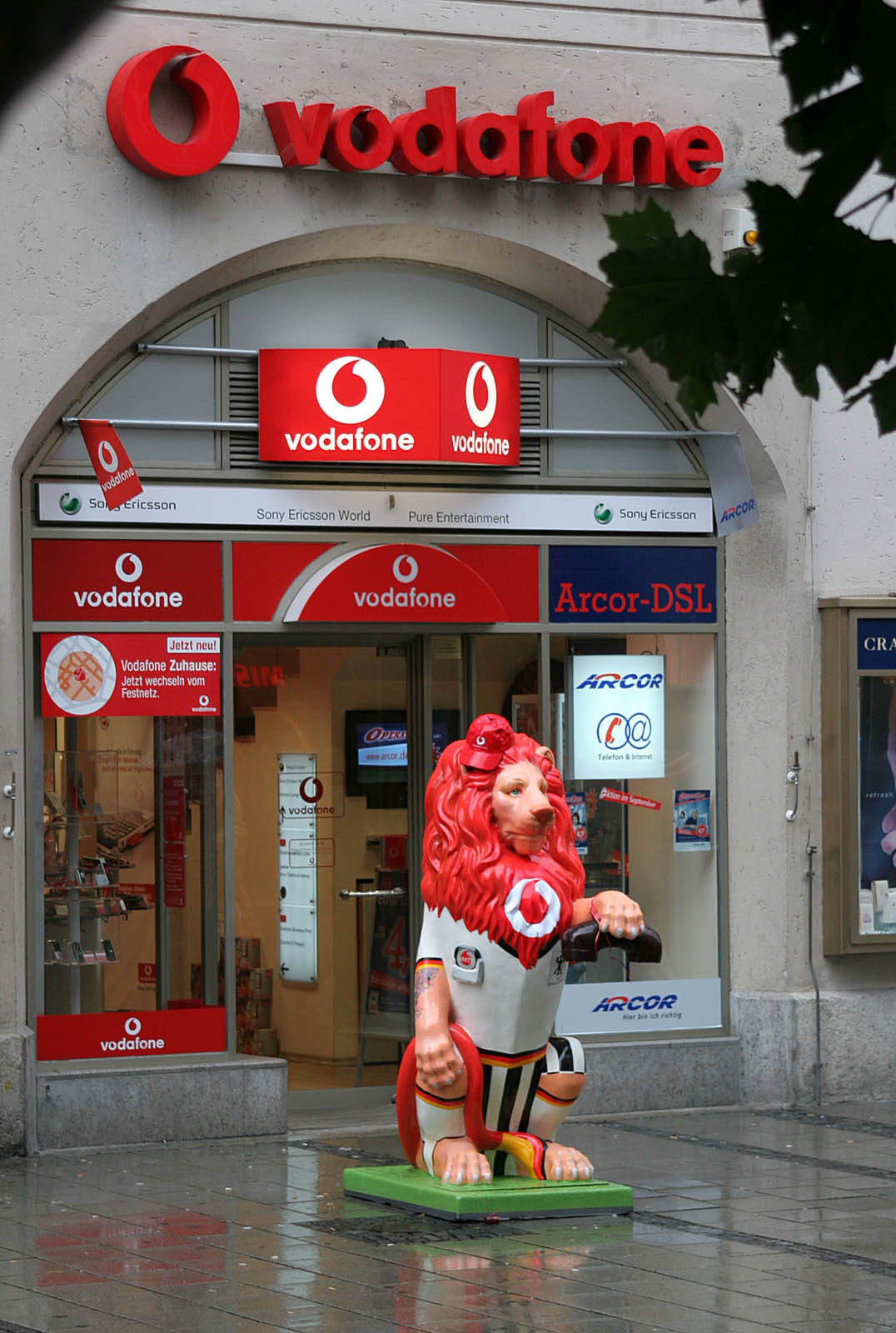
The Vodafone Lion on the Löwenparade in Munich, Germany

On 1 May 2007, Vodafone added Jersey and Guernsey to the community, as Airtel was signed as Partner Network in both crown dependencies. In June 2007, Vodafone UK began optimising web pages accessed through Vodafone Live!, which was criticised by The Register for interfering with mobile commerce websites. On 1 August 2007, Vodafone Portugal launched Vodafone Messenger, a service with Windows Live Messenger and Yahoo! Messenger. At the end of 2007, Vodafone Germany was ranked 6th in Europe by subscriber numbers, whilst its Italian operation was listed as 10th. Vodafone UK was ranked 13th, whilst Spain was listed in 16th place.

On 17 April 2008, Vodafone extended its footprint to Serbia as Vip mobile was added to the community as a Partner Network, and on 20 May 2008, the Company added VIP Operator as a Partner Network, thereby extending their global presence to North Macedonia.

On 30 October 2008, the company announced a strategic, non-equity partnership with Mobile TeleSystems (MTS) group of Russia. The agreement added Russia, Armenia, Turkmenistan, Ukraine, and Uzbekistan to the group's global presence.

On 20 March 2009, it was announced that the group's Luxembourg partner has been changed: the agreement with LuxGSM was not renewed in favour of Tango, the Luxembourg unit of another partner network, Belgacom of Belgium.

On 22 July 2009, Nar Mobile in Azerbaijan was signed as a partner network.

On 4 April 2011, Vodafone sold its 44% stake in SFR, the second-largest operator in France, to Vivendi for €7.95 billion.

In March 2013, the Spanish operations of Vodafone signed an agreement with Orange S.A. to co-invest €1 billion in the expansion of Spain's fibre-optic cable broadband network, which would enable Vodafone to reach an additional 6 million customers in Spain by 2017. On 24 June 2013, Vodafone announced it would be buying German cable company Kabel Deutschland. The takeover was valued at €7.7 billion, and was recommended over the bid of rival Liberty Global. In February 2014, Vodafone made an offer to acquire Spain's largest cable operator, ONO, for total consideration, including associated net debt acquired, of €7.2 billion.

In October 2015, Russia's Mobile TeleSystems and Vodafone expanded their 2008 strategic partnership; this resulted in the rebranding of MTS Ukraine to Vodafone Ukraine.

On 31 December 2016, Vodafone Group's Dutch operations merged with Liberty Global's Ziggo brand, creating VodafoneZiggo Group Holding B.V., a 50:50 joint venture Vodafone sold its stake to Liberty Global in February 2026.

==== Consolidation period since 2019 ====
Since 2019, Vodafone has entered into a period of consolidation of its European business, characterised mainly by sales of parts of its business, and the spinning off of some of its assets into separate companies. In 2019, Vodafone sold its stake in Vodafone Malta to Monaco Telecom. Also in 2019, Vodafone Group created a legally separate organisation comprising its European mobile towers. At the same time it was reported that the mobile towers business could be valued at about £10 billion. The mobile towers business was named Vantage Towers on 24 July 2020. Vantage Towers is headquartered in Düsseldorf, Germany, with towers infrastructure in Germany, Spain, Greece, Portugal, Czech Republic, Romania, Hungary, Italy and Ireland comprising a total of 68,000 towers.

In 2023, Vodafone sold its stake in Vodafone Ghana to Telecel Group, and Vodafone Magyarország (Vodafone Hungary) to the Hungarian state. Later in June 2023, Vodafone also announced that it intended to merge Vodafone UK with Three UK, which is owned by CK Hutchison Holdings. At first Vodafone owned 51% of the newly formed company, but in May 2026 Hutchison sold its stake to Vodafone. The merger was criticised by some consumer agencies in the UK, leading to an antitrust inquiry by the Competition and Markets Authority into whether the newly merged company could substantially lessen competition. On 5 December 2024, Vodafone and Three's $19B merger was cleared by UK regulators (with conditions).

In September 2023, Zegona Communications also confirmed that it was in talks to buy Vodafone España. On 31 May 2024, Zegona Communications completed the acquisition process, separating from the business from Vodafone Group.

On 15 March 2024, Swisscom signed a binding purchase proposal to acquire 100% of Vodafone Italia for €8 billion, with the goal of merging it with Fastweb. The transaction was expected to be completed by the first quarter of 2025. As part of the agreement, Vodafone will continue to provide certain services to Fastweb, as well as grant the use of its brand for a maximum period of five years.

In September 2024, the Antitrust Authority published a notice of investigation and launched an inquiry. Swisscom announced that the European Commission had approved the acquisition of Vodafone Italia under the Foreign Subsidies Regulation. The transaction was also approved by AGCOM and AGCM in November and December 2024, respectively.

On 31 December 2024, Swisscom, through Fastweb, completed the acquisition of Vodafone Italia, giving rise to Fastweb + Vodafone.

=== Oceania ===
Networks in Oceania
Minority-owned	Partner networks	
Australia	Cook Islands	Fiji
	French Polynesia	Kiribati
	New Zealand	Papua New Guinea
	Samoa	Vanuatu

==== Australia ====
In October 1993, Vodafone Australia's network went live. In December 2004, Vodafone Australia agreed to deploy high-speed MPLS network built by Lucent Worldwide Services using Juniper hardware. In October 2005, it began launching 3G technology in Australia. On 5 September 2008, Vodafone purchased Australia's largest bricks and mortar mobile phone retailer Crazy John's adding 115 retail stores to its local operations.

On 9 February 2009, Vodafone Australia announced a merger with 3/Hutchison via a joint venture company VHA Pty Ltd, which would offer products under the Vodafone brand. On 19 June 2009, Vodafone-Hutchison Australia (VHA) announced the end of its outsourcing of retail operations. VHA committed to buying back and managing its entire retail operation, including 208 Vodafone-branded retail outlets Australia-wide. This project was scheduled to be completed by 1 September 2009.

On 31 August 2009, VHA enabled an extended 900 MHz 3G UMTS network which functions outside their 2,100 MHz 3G network, boosting Vodafone's 3G population coverage from around 8% to around 94% on dual-band 900/2,100 MHz 3G UMTS devices.

On 13 July 2020, VHA merged with TPG to create TPG Telecom Limited.

==== Fiji ====
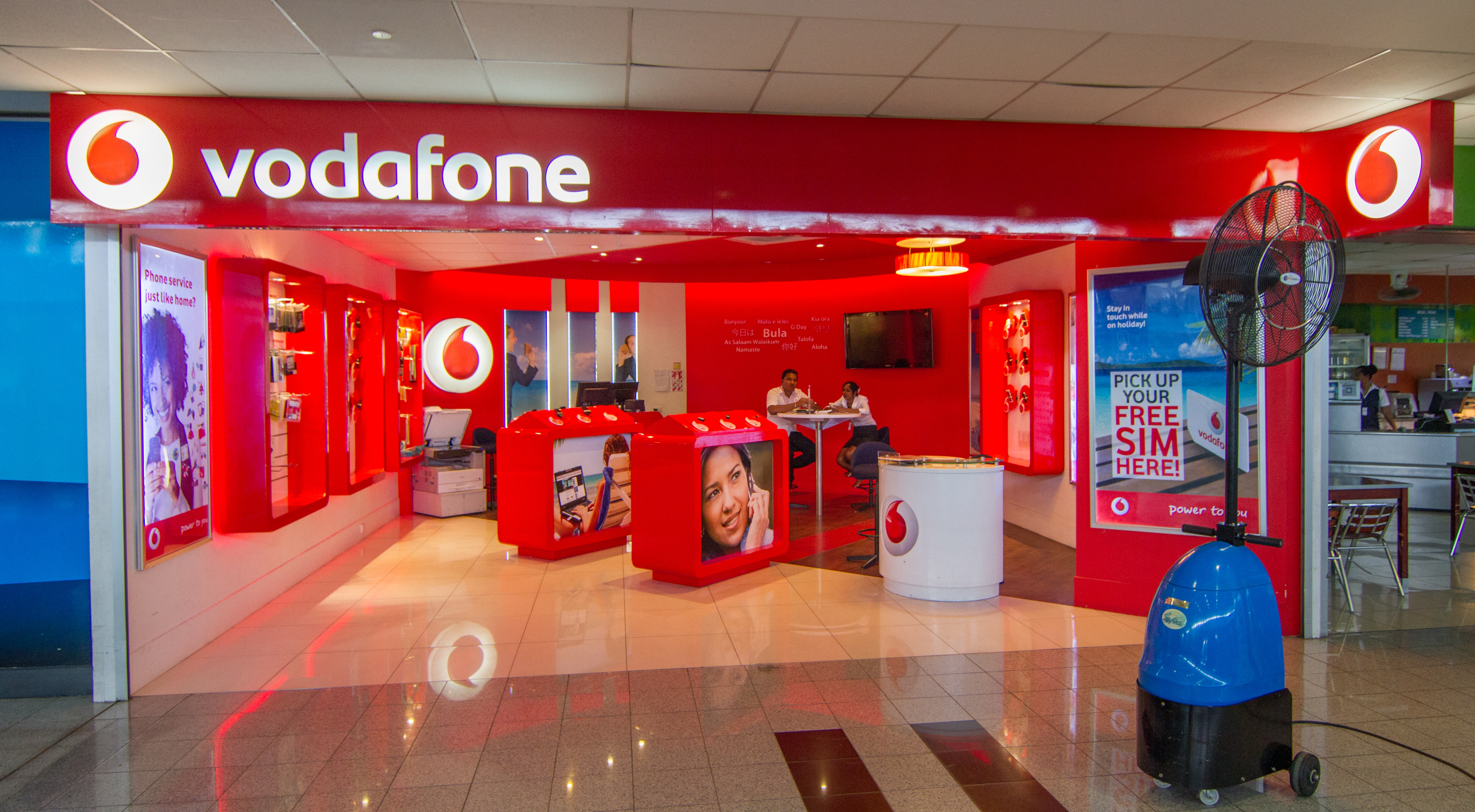
Vodafone shop at Nadi Airport, Fiji

In July 1994, Vodafone Fiji's network went live. In July 2014, Vodafone sold its 49% shareholding of Vodafone Fiji to The Fiji National Provident fund. Under the terms of the deal, Vodafone Fiji retained its branding under a Partner Market Agreement.

==== New Zealand ====
In July 1993, BellSouth New Zealand's network went live. In November 1998, Vodafone purchased BellSouth New Zealand, which later became Vodafone New Zealand. In August 2005, Vodafone launched 3G technology in New Zealand. On 9 October 2006, Vodafone New Zealand bought New Zealand's 3rd largest internet service provider, iHug. In October 2013, Vodafone began its rollout of 4G to provincial New Zealand, with the launch of the system in holiday hotspots around Coromandel.

In 2019, Vodafone sold its New Zealand division to a consortium of investors, making it independent from the parent company. It retained a licensing agreement to continue use of the Vodafone name and logo in exchange for fee payments, up until September 2022 when Vodafone New Zealand announced that it would change its name to One NZ in early 2023. It was estimated that this would save the company NZ$20 to 30 million a year, by not having to pay Vodafone licensing fees. The rebranding was completed in April 2023.

=== Vodafone Global Enterprise ===
Vodafone Global Enterprise is the business services division, and a wholly owned subsidiary of Vodafone Group. It was established in April 2007 to provide telecommunications and information technology services to large corporations.

The division offers integrated communications in cloud computing, unified communications and collaboration. Its services include domestic and international voice and data, machine-to-machine services, mobile email, mobile broadband, managed services, mobile payment and mobile recording.

In December 2011, it acquired the Reading-based Bluefish Communications Ltd, an ICT consultancy company. The acquired operations formed the nucleus of a new Unified Communications and Collaboration practice within VGE, working on cloud computing and professional services.

Vodafone Global Enterprise operates in over 65 countries, with "Northern Europe" (based in London, United Kingdom), "Central Europe", "Southern Europe and Africa", "Asia Pacific & Sub-Saharan Africa" (based in Singapore) and "Americas" geographical divisions. VGE's major customers include Deutsche Post, The Linde Group, Unilever, and Volkswagen Group.

== Products and services ==
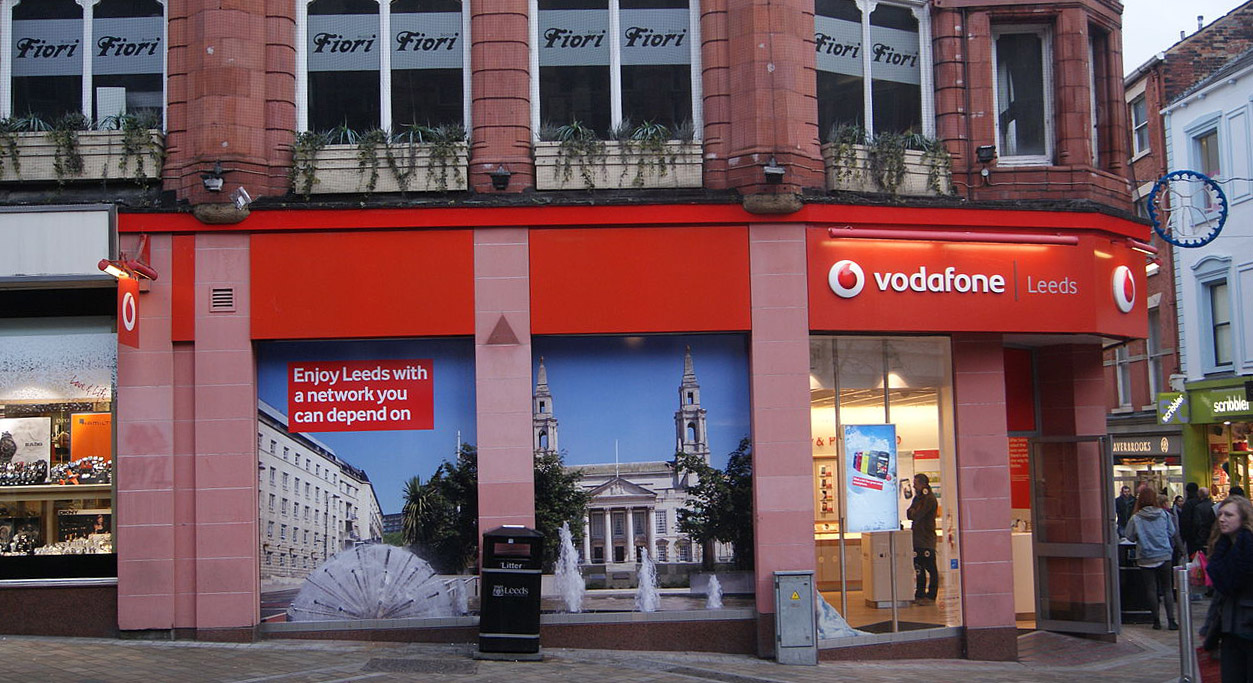
A Vodafone shop selling a range of products in Leeds, England

In October 2009, it launched Vodafone 360, a new internet service for the mobile, PC and Mac. This was discontinued in December 2011 after disappointing hardware sales. This was after the Director of Internet Services resigned in September 2010 tweeting "5 days before I leave Vodafone. Freedom beckons." In February 2010, Vodafone launched the world's cheapest mobile phone known as Vodafone 150, intended to sell for below $15 (£10) in the developing world. It was initially launched in India, Turkey and eight African countries including Lesotho, Kenya and Ghana.

=== Mobile money transfer services ===
In March 2007, Safaricom, which is part owned by Vodafone and the leading mobile communication provider in Kenya, launched mobile payment software developed by Vodafone.

By February 2008, the M-PESA money transfer system in Kenya had gained 1.6 million customers. By 2011 there were fourteen million M-Pesa accounts by which held 40 per cent of the country's savings. Following M-PESA's success in Kenya, Vodafone announced that it was to extend the service to Afghanistan. The service here was launched on the Roshan network under the brand M-Paisa with a different focus to the Kenyan service. M-Paisa was targeted as a vehicle for microfinance institutions' (MFI) loan disbursements and repayments, alongside business-to-business applications such as salary disbursement. The Afghanistan launch was followed in April 2008 by the announcement of further a further launch of M-PESA in Tanzania, South Africa and India.

In February 2012, Vodafone announced a worldwide partnership with Visa.

=== Health services ===
In November 2009, Vodafone announced the creation of a new business unit focused on the emerging market supplying mobile communications and network technologies to healthcare. One of its early success stories is with the Novartis-led "SMS for Life" project in Tanzania, for which Vodafone developed and deployed a text-message based system that enables all the country's 4,600 public health facilities to report their levels of anti-malarial medications so that stock level data can be viewed centrally in real-time, enabling timely re-supply of stock. During the SMS for Life pilot, which covered 129 health facilities over six months, stock-outs dropped from 26% to 0.8%, saving thousands of lives.

=== Vodafone Foundation ===
Vodafone Foundation is a recognised charity which supports and initiates projects which use mobile technology to benefit the vulnerable, using the slogan "Connecting for Good". Examples of their initiatives include the World of Difference programme – successful applicants choose charities for which they work either full-time for two months or part-time for four months (minimum 15 hours a week). The charities are provided with £2,500, with each winner receiving the balance as a salary after NI and tax have been paid.

== Advertising ==
Since 2021, Vodafone's global advertising has used the slogan "Together We Can". Previous slogans have been, in 2017, "The future is exciting. Ready?" and in 2009, "Power to You".

== Sponsorships ==
Sport sponsorship has long been central to Vodafone's brand building. Vodafone sponsored the Premier League team Manchester United F.C. from 2000 until the 2005–06 season. In 2007, Vodafone entered into a title sponsorship deal with the McLaren Formula One team (previously Vodafone sponsored Scuderia Ferrari in 2002 until 2006), which traded as "Vodafone McLaren Mercedes" until the sponsorship ended at the end of the 2013 season.

Vodafone's sponsorships include:

- S.L. Benfica (1996–2005)
- Manchester United F.C. (2000–06)
- Scuderia Ferrari (2002–06)
- Al Ahly SC (2002–17)
- Olympiacos F.C. (2006–09)
- McLaren (2007–13)
- Beşiktaş J.K. (2014–20)
- Borussia Dortmund (2025–present)

== Corporate affairs ==
=== Senior management ===
Sir Gerald Whent, at that time an Executive with Racal Electronics plc, was responsible for the bid for a UK Cellular Network licence. The Mobile Telecoms division was de-merged, and was floated on the London Stock Exchange in October 1988 and Sir Gerald became Chief Executive of Racal Telecom plc. Over the next few years the company grew to become the UK's market leader, changing its name to Vodafone Group plc in the process.

Sir Christopher Gent took over as Chief Executive in January 1997, after Sir Gerald's retirement. Gent was responsible for transforming Vodafone from a small UK operator into the global operator, through the merger with the American AirTouch and the takeover of Germany's Mannesmann.

Arun Sarin was the driving force behind the company's move into emerging markets such as Asia and Africa, through the purchases such as that of Turkish operator Telsim, and a majority stake in Hutchison Essar in India.

The fourth CEO, Vittorio Colao, stepped up from Deputy Chief Executive in July 2008.

Over ten years, Colao sold the stake in Verizon Wireless and refocused the group on converged fixed and mobile services in Europe. He was succeeded in October 2018 by Nick Read, whose four-year tenure was marked by asset sales and a fall of around 40% in the share price. Margherita Della Valle, the group's chief financial officer, has led the company since January 2023. The board has been chaired since 2020 by Jean-François van Boxmeer.

No.	Chief Executive	Tenure
1	Sir Gerald Whent	October 1988 – December 1996
2	Sir Christopher Gent	January 1997 – July 2003
3	Arun Sarin	July 2003 – July 2008
4	Vittorio Colao	July 2008 – September 2018
5	Nick Read	October 2018 – December 2022
6	Margherita Della Valle	January 2023 – present

=== Ownership ===
Vodafone has a primary listing on the London Stock Exchange and is a constituent of the FTSE 100 Index. For most of its history, its share capital was widely held by institutional investors. From 2022, two strategic shareholders emerged: the Emirati operator Etisalat (then known as e&), which built a stake of more than 14% and obtained a board seat, and Xavier Niel, who first disclosed a 2.5% stake in September 2022. In July 2026, Etisalat sold its entire holding to Niel's family investment company Vega, which became the largest shareholder with about 18.8% of the share capital and 19.87% of the voting rights once all its purchases were completed.

=== Financial results ===
Vodafone reports its results in accordance with International Financial Reporting Standards (IFRS). Financial performance has been as follows:

Year ended 31 March	Turnover €m	Profit before tax €m	Profit for the year €m	Basic eps (cents)
2026	40,461	1,864	(49)	(1.20)
2025	37,448	(1,478)	(3,746)	(15.86)
2024	36,717	1,620	1,505	4.45
2023	45,706	12,816	12,335	42.77
2022	45,580	3,954	2,624	7.20
2021	43,809	4,400	536	0.38
2020	44,974	795	(455)	(3.13)
2019	43,666	(2,613)	(7,644)	(16.25)
2018	46,571	3,878	2,788	15.87
2017	47,631	2,792	(6,079)	(7.83)
2016	49,810	(190)	(5,122)	(20.27)
2015	48,385	1,734	7,477	28.72

== Criticisms ==
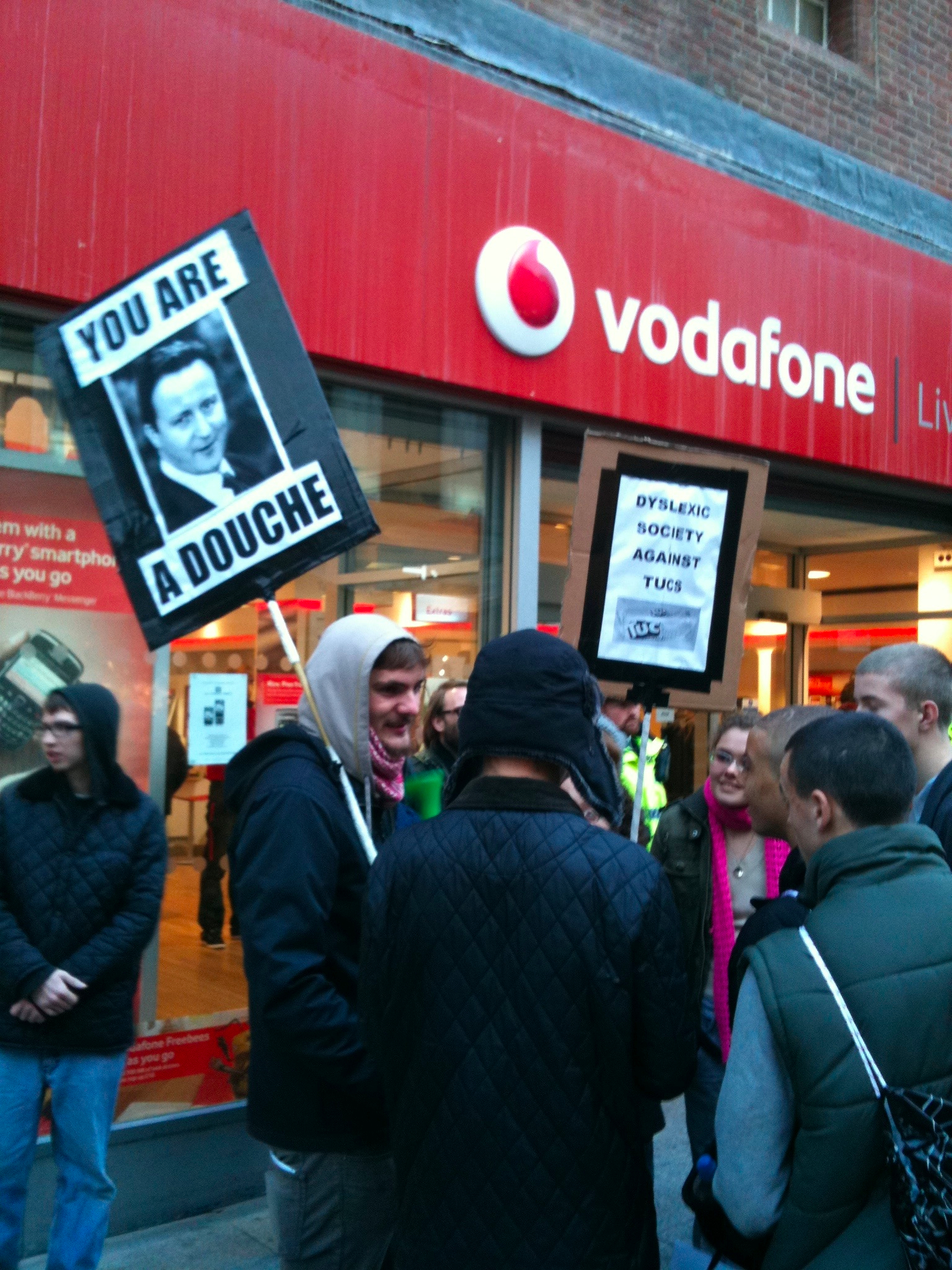
UK Uncut protestors outside a Vodafone shop in Liverpool

=== Tax avoidance ===
In September 2010, an investigation by Private Eye magazine revealed certain details of Vodafone's tax avoidance activities. It was reported that Vodafone routed the acquisition of Mannesmann through a Luxembourg subsidiary, set up to avoid paying tax on the deal, and continued to place its profits in Luxembourg. Following a long legal struggle with HMRC (during which a senior HMRC official, John Connors, switched sides to become head of tax at Vodafone), it was eventually agreed that Vodafone would pay £1.25 billion related to the acquisition. Based on Vodafone's accounts, experts have estimated the potential tax bill written off as a result of the negotiations was over £6 billion.

The news of this legal tax avoidance sparked angry protests, beginning in October 2010, outside Vodafone shops across the UK, organised under the banner of UK Uncut. The protests caused the closure of various stores across the UK.

In 2011, Private Eye magazine and The Bureau of Investigative Journalism alleged that Vodafone's Swiss branches were run by a single part-time bookkeeper. The report claimed hardly any business was done from there, indicating that the main purpose of the Zug office was tax avoidance. The report claimed the money was borrowed from the Swiss branch of the Luxembourg company, allowing it to take advantage of Luxembourg's laws, which exempts foreign branches of companies from tax, and Swiss laws, which almost completely exempt local branches of foreign companies. According to the expose, this would have otherwise generated a British tax bill of a little over £2 billion. It said Vodafone publishes a single, combined set of accounts for its Luxembourg subsidiaries and their Swiss branches. For the one company, profits worth £1.6 billion were taxed at less than 1% in 2011, and the profits are likely to have been attributed to Switzerland. In its response to these allegations, Vodafone has said the Swiss branch has not been involved in Vodafone's global financing for a number of years. It is, therefore, irrelevant in respect to global financing arrangements.

Vodafone was also assessed a US$2.5 billion tax over its acquisition of Hutchison Whampoa's Indian assets in 2007, a demand that it contests. In January 2012, the highest Indian court ruled that Vodafone is not liable for taxes and penalties of up to £2.8 billion. However, in February 2016 India's tax department sent Vodafone a renewed tax notice of £1.4bn. Following the siding of the Indian court with Vodafone in 2012, the government changed the law to allow firms to be retrospectively taxed. In September 2020, an international arbitration tribunal sided with Vodafone and ruled that India's efforts to claim past taxes was in violation of fair treatment under the bilateral investment protection pact between India and the Netherlands. India was asked by the tribunal to stop its efforts to claim the tax dues.

=== Communications blackout during the Arab Spring ===
Vodafone was implicated in the violent suppression of pro-democracy protests in Egypt's 2011 demonstrations. On 27 January, Vodafone, responsible for much of Egypt's telecommunication infrastructure, shut off all voice and data services for Egyptian citizens and businesses at the request of the Egyptian Government under Hosni Mubarak. On 28 January 2011, Vodafone complied with Egyptian government instructions to suspend Internet service "in selected areas" during a period of anti-Mubarak protests. The company issued a statement that "Under Egyptian legislation, the authorities have the right to issue such an order and we are obliged to comply with it."

Vodafone also received public and media criticism for allowing the authorities to send mass pro-government messages via SMS over their network during the protests. One such message requested that "honest and loyal men" should "confront the traitors and criminals". Vodafone later issued a statement asserting that they had no choice but to allow the messages to be broadcast, and that they had complained to the Egyptian authorities about the practice. The Daily Telegraph of the UK reported, "The Egyptian government's action is unprecedented in the history of the internet." US-based Internet intelligence firm Renesys stated, "in an action unprecedented in Internet history, the Egyptian government appears to have ordered service providers to shut down all international connections to the Internet." Vodafone Group CEO Vittorio Colao said the company was obliged by law to comply with the instructions of the Egyptian government. At the company's annual general meeting, on 26 June, the campaign groups Access and FairPensions asked Vodafone to endorse a plan to prevent the company facing similar demands in the future.

=== Poor customer service ===
In Australia, particularly towards the end of 2010, Vodafone was heavily criticised due to allegations of poor customer service and severe technical inadequacies, which earned them their nickname "Vodafail" – a website of the same name still exists. In response, they have developed a "new" network, and now provide a 30-day satisfaction guarantee.

In 2019, Vodafone was rated as the UK's worst mobile network provider for the eighth year in a row, in the eighth annual survey by consumer lobby group Which?.

=== Unlimited roaming costs on stolen phones ===
Vodafone UK, in common with other operators, has been criticised for holding customers on regular monthly billed contracts liable for almost unlimited roaming costs when their phones are stolen abroad, despite being seemingly able to limit costs of pay-as-you-go contracts.

=== Breaches of consumer protection rules ===
In October 2016, Vodafone was fined a record £4.6m by Ofcom for "serious" breaches of consumer protection rules.

In October 2017, Citizens Advice undertook a mystery shopping exercise which found that Vodafone, along with EE and Three, were not reducing customers' bills after fixed deals finished which meant that they were paying an extra £22 a month on average.

=== Surveillance infrastructure ===
In June 2014, Vodafone revealed information about their and other telecommunication operators' 'direct access systems', content data and metadata interception programmes globally.

=== Scam investigation ===
In March 2019, the Indian investigation agency CBI filed a plea in the Supreme Court of India against Vodafone and Airtel alleging non cooperation in the Saradha chitfund scam. The court listed the matter for a hearing on 8 April 2019.

=== Return to office mandate ===
In March 2025, it was reported that Vodafone would require all UK-based head office staff to attend the office two to three days per week, or at least eight days per month. Failure to comply would result in disciplinary proceedings and a final written warning being issued, which would mean individuals would not be eligible for a bonus in that financial year. It was reported that colleagues struggled to find sufficient rooms to have in-person meetings, and would spend time in the office on video calls with people in other offices around the world.

=== Franchise dispute ===
In December 2025, The Guardian released an investigation which revealed claims that Adrian Howe, a former Vodafone employee who had agreed to start a franchise in 2018, had taken his own life after pressure from the company.

In July 2026, Vodafone settled a High Court claim brought by 62 former franchises, who alleged that the company had unjustly enriched itself at their expense. The claimants had alleged losses of up to £85 million. Vodafone settled without admitting liability.

== Brand identity ==
1991–1997

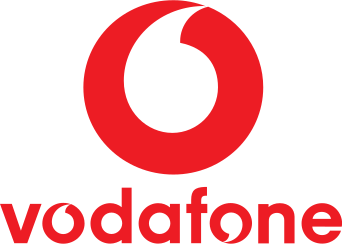
1997–2006

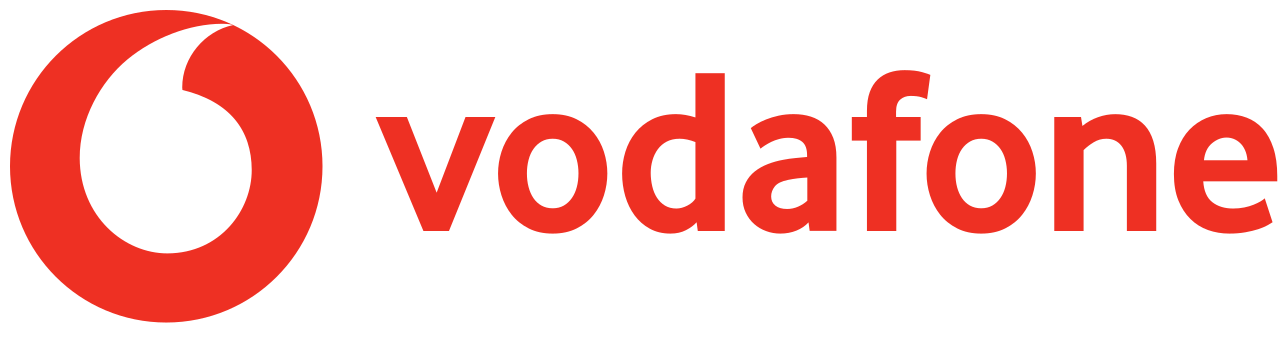
2017–present

== See also ==
- List of mobile network operators
- List of mobile network operators of Europe
