= Siragusa =

Siragusa is a surname. Notable people with the surname include:

- Charles J. Siragusa (born 1947), American judge
- Charles Siragusa (born 1913), American federal narcotics agent
- Elisa Siragusa (born 1986), Italian politician
- Irene Siragusa (born 1993), Italian sprinter
- Kaitlyn Siragusa or Amouranth (born 1993), American cosplayer and streamer
- Nico Siragusa (born 1994), American football player
- Stefano Siragusa (born 1976), Italian businessman
- Tony Siragusa (1967–2022), American football player
