= Yolanda Zoleka Cuba =

South African businesswoman

Yolanda Cuba
- Born: Yolanda Zoleka Cuba; South Africa
- Education: University of Cape Town - Bachelor of Commerce (Statistics), University of Natal - Honours in Bachelor of Commerce (Accounting); University of Pretoria - Masters in Commerce (Financial Management)
- Employers: Mvelaphanda Group of Companies (2003-2010); South African Breweries Limited (2011–2014); Vodacom Group Limited (2014-2016); Vodafone Ghana (2016-2019); MTN Group (2020–present); Board of Absa Group Limited; South African Breweries

Yolanda Zoleka Cuba is the Group Vice President Southern and East Africa Region at MTN Group, one of Africa's telecommunications companies.

She is the former Chief Executive Officer of Vodafone Ghana having been appointed to the position in March 2016. Cuba initially joined Vodacom Group Limited in 2013 as a non-executive director before joining in an executive capacity in November 2014 and served as its Group Chief Officer of Strategy Mergers & Acquisitions and New Business till her promotion to Chief Executive. She led Vodacom's mergers and acquisitions as well as its acceleration unit into telco adjacencies such as financial services, etc. Cuba previously served as an Executive Director of Strategy & Business Support at The South African Breweries Limited since February 2012. She was announced as MTN Group's Chief Digital and FinTech officer (incoming) in July 2019.

Cuba has served on a number of JSE-listed boards and is a member of the Nelson Mandela Investment Committee since 2007.

== Education ==
She holds a Bachelor of Commerce in Statistics from the University of Cape Town, a Bachelor of Commerce Honours degree in Accounting from University of Natal and a Masters in Commerce degree from the University of Pretoria.

== Career ==
She is now the Chief Digital & Fintech Officer at MTN Group. Previously occupied the position of Chief Executive Officer of Mvelaphanda Holdings Pty Ltd, Chief Executive Officer & Executive Director at New Bond Capital Ltd, Chief Officer-Strategy & New Business at Vodacom Group Ltd and Executive Director at SABMiller South Africa Ltd. She was a board member of Absa Group Limited and South African Breweries Ltd.

Cuba was a former CEO of Vodafone Ghana.

== Awards ==
Cuba received the following awards:

- 2006 - Top Empowered Business Woman of the Year by Top Companies
- 2007 - Youth Excellence award by the Black Management Forum
