= St Mary's Independent School, Southampton =

Private day school in Southampton, Hampshire, England (1922 to 2020)

Location
- 57 Midanbury Lane; Bitterne Park; Southampton, Hampshire, SO18 4DJ; England; 50.9197°N 1.3681°W

Information
- Type: Private day
- Motto: Semper Paratus (Always Prepared)
- Established: 1922
- Closed: 2020
- Local authority: Southampton
- Gender: Co-educational
- Age: 3 to 16
- Enrolment: 283
- Colours: Original : Dark brown, gold 2017 : Dark blue, gold
- Former pupils: Old Simmarians
- Website: http://www.stmarysindependentschool.co.uk

St Mary's Independent School, formerly named St Mary's College, was an independent day school for boys and girls in Southampton, Hampshire, England.

== History ==
The school was on the site of a former country house called Bitterne Grove, built c1790 by Richard Leversuch. In 1910 the house was bought by the French order of the Brothers of Christian Instruction and renamed as St Mary's House. Initially it was a centre for students who were exiled from France due to anti-clerical laws passed there in 1903 and training for the Brotherhood, until the centre was relocated to Highlands College, Jersey, in the Channel Islands.

In 1922 it became the first secondary school specifically for Catholic boys in Southampton, under the name of St Mary's College, and opened with five Brothers and 30 pupils. During the Second World War rapid expansion of the school took place; the number of pupils passing from 200 at the start of the War to 400 at the end. In 1992 the junior department started taking girls and in 2000 the senior department was opened to girls, and latterly approximately 25% of the pupils were girls. Former pupils are known as Old Simmarians.

From 1925 to 1964 Rev Brother Maurice worked at the school. Before WWI he had been sent as a teacher amongst the Blackfoot Indians in Montana and Eskimos on the Yukon River. During the war he served with great distinction in the French Medical Corps. He was twice wounded and also mentioned three times in dispatches for gallantry. He was awarded the Croix de Guerre with palm and two stars, as well as the Médaille Militaire and, for his bravery on the battlefield of Verdun in 1916, the Legion of Honour Military Medal. He was twice headmaster of St Mary's (1928–31 and 1937–43) and later head of its prep-school, Charlton.

In 2013 Ofsted judged the school as 'Good'. In 2018 another inspection judged it to 'Requires Improvement'. In 2019 it was reinspected and judged 'Inadequate'.

In 2020 the school went into administration following financial difficulties which had been "significantly impacted" due to the coronavirus pandemic. One-third of the former site was acquired by private investors and re-opened in Sept 2021 as Yarrow Heights, a school for children aged 7–16 with social, emotional and mental health needs. In September 2020, the primary school element was reopened on the other two-thirds of the land, using its former name of Charlton House (independent school).

St. Mary's College blazer badge

== Notable former pupils ==
- Roy Brindley, poker player, TV commentator, author
- Robert Chote, chairman of the Office of Budget Responsibility
- Patrick Garland, writer, actor, theatre and film director
- Philip Hoare, writer, TV programme maker, journalist, professor of creative writing at Southampton University
- Nick Holmes, former Southampton footballer
- Andrew Surman, former Southampton and former Norwich City footballer
- Sir Gerry Whent, CEO of Vodafone
