= Margherita Della Valle =

Italian business executive

- Born: Margherita Della Valle; 13 April 1965 (age 60); Veneto, Italy
- Education: Bocconi University
- Occupation: Businesswoman
- Employer: Vodafone
- Title: CEO
- Term: December 2022 - present
- Predecessor: Nick Read

Margherita Della Valle (born 13 April 1965, Veneto) is an Italian businesswoman who has been the chief executive officer (CEO) of Vodafone since January 2023. She began working at Vodafone Italy in 1994, before becoming group CFO in 2018.

Della Valle was elected Chairman of 100 Group, the association that brings together FTSE 100 CFOs. She also holds the role of non-executive director at Reckitt.

== Early life & education ==
Della Valle was born and grew up in the Lombardy region of Italy. Della Valle attended Lycée Albert Premier in Monaco, and then studied at Bocconi University during the mid-1980s, where she received a masters degree in economics.

== Career ==
Della Valle began her professional career at Montedison, working in the study and strategic planning office. She then joined Omnitel in 1994, and performed various roles at the company including marketing and customer management. Her career became more focused on financial roles in the 1990s. Many of these roles were with Vodafone Italy, after the telecoms conglomerate acquired Omnitel in 1994.

The company transitioned to Vodafone Italy in 2004, and her roles at Vodafone Italy increased in seniority during the 2000s. She became the Chief Financial Officer of the Italian telecoms firm in 2004, and held the position for three years until 2007. She left Vodafone Italy after she was promoted to CFO for Vodafone Group's European Region. She became Deputy Chief Financial Officer of Vodafone in 2015, before becoming the CFO in 2018. Following her promotion to CFO, she received media coverage as one of the few women to hold the position for FTSE 100 companies. Four years after her appointment in 2022 only 15 women held the position. During this period, she was also elected as Chairman of 100 Group. In July 2020, she was appointed the non-executive director of Reckitt.

In 2022, she returned to Bocconi University to receive the university's Alumni of the Year 2022 award for her achievements in business. Following the news that Vodafone's CEO Nick Read would step down from his role in December 2022, Della Valle was announced as the corporation's temporary CEO. The FTSE 100 company announced in mid-2023 that Della Valle's position as CEO had been made permanent. In October 2023, she was recognised by Fortune magazine in its Most Powerful Women list. She was ranked in 36th position. In 2023, she ranked 42nd in Forbes list of "World's 100 most powerful women" and 36th on Fortune's list of Most Powerful Women.

== Personal life ==
Della Valle is married and has two sons. She currently resides in London.
