= Stefano Siragusa =

Italian executive

Stefano Siragusa (born January 29, 1976) is an Italian executive. He was deputy general manager of TIM.

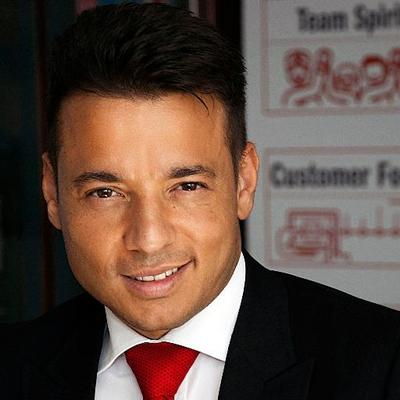
Stefano Siragusa - TIM

== Early life and education ==
Siragusa was born in Feltre, Veneto, Italy, in 1976. He graduated cum laude in Engineering from Politecnico di Milano in 2000. He completed his education by obtaining an MBA cum laude from MIP and an executive from Harvard. During his studies, he worked as product manager for Siemens AG in Germany and Italy.

== Career at BCG ==
In 2002 he joined in The Boston Consulting Group (BCG), working for leading industrial players in the railway, aerospace & defence, automotive, steel and concrete sectors in Europe, Asia-Pacific and particularly in North America, where he transferred in 2005 to join the firm's Chicago office. In 2011 he was elected partner and managing director of BCG and was appointed leader of the Industrial Goods division in Italy, Greece and Turkey. In 2012 he had, also, the responsibility to coordinate Aerospace & Defence division in Europe and Middle East. In 2013 he became a member of BCG's global operations leadership team and entrusted with the responsibility of coordinating BCG's global content agenda for lean, procurement and supply chain. In 2013 he moved to New York City.

== CEO of Ansaldo STS ==
In 2014 he became CEO and general manager of Ansaldo STS, a multinational company listed on the Milan Stock Exchange which delivers worldwide the mass transit and railways projects. On November 2, 2015, Hitachi Rail Italy Investments completed the purchase of 40% of the share capital of Ansaldo STS from Finmeccanica and he was reconfirmed as CEO and General Manager. On May 13, 2016, Siragusa resigned.

During his management new orders grew by 160%, net results by 80%, FCOF by 90%, EBIT by 27% and revenues by about 20%.

He has been the youngest business executive who leads a listed company on the Borsa Italiana for three years.

== Career at Bain & Company ==
On May 16, 2016, Siragusa became senior partner and director of Bain & Company, with responsibilities on performance improvement in the industrial good and services practice. Siragusa launched the special situation practice focused on identify, select, acquire, structurally transform and sell distressed or not performing assets

== Deputy general manager of TIM ==
On December 7, 2021, Siragusa became deputy general manager of and leads circa 35,000 resources. Siragusa ensures, at group level, 16b€ revenues, 7B€ Ebitda, 3B€ investments through the oversight of marketing and technical supply activities for the national and international market of fixed and mobile network. Siragusa ensures the development of the wholesale business, through innovation, the definition of the offer, and marketing of the relative products and services. Ensures the engineering, planning, design, construction, and deployment of all the infrastructures and the effectiveness and the efficiency of all the operations required for the resiliency of both the fixed and mobile networks. Ensures the design, implementation and evolution of Information Technology, with a view to the digital transformation of the group. Ensures caring activities, operational credit, loyalty and retention, and administrative customer management with the aim of guaranteeing the efficiency of the service maximizing customer satisfaction. On August 3, 2022, Siragusa decided to resign from his role to due irreconcilable strategic differences over group's future especially on network breakup and liquidation. Siragusa effectively left the group on December 31, 2022. The group gave Siragusa its heartfelt thanks for the important work done and for the particularly significant results achieved, as well as for the remarkable managerial contribution made in the interests of the company and the group

== Chief revenue, information and media officer of TIM ==
On July 5, 2021, Siragusa became chief revenue officer of TIM. Siragusa ensures, at group level, 17b€ revenues and 7B€ Ebitda through the definition of the offer, prices, marketing plans, go to market as well as the development of the Multimedia offer, the design of ICT solutions, the marketing of products and services and the caring and credit management activities. On September 27, 2021, Siragusa was further entrusted with the responsibility of defining the group's offer, prices, marketing plans, go to market as well as the development of the multimedia/corporate/commercial and digital communication/media offer, the design of ICT solutions, the marketing of products and services and the caring and credit management activities

== Chief technology and operating officer of TIM ==
Since 5 July 2021, Siragusa was CTOO – chief technology and operating officer of TIM. Siragusa has ensured, at group level, the engineering, planning, design, construction and deployment of all the infrastructures and the effectiveness and the efficiency of all the operations required for the resiliency of both the fixed and mobile network. He led 22,000 resources, 3B€ investments, ensures revenues for 13B€ and delivers 5B€ Ebitda. He has successfully executed the digital transformation across whole group's operations: productivity increased by + 32%, On field failures reduced by – 26%, wholesale revenues increased by 4%, Ebitda by 7% and Cash generation by 12%. Siragusa international managerial profile has allowed him to hold a series of leadership positions in the group. Before being promoted to CTOO of the group, Siragusa has been chief operating officer. Before he has been chief wholesale infrastructures network and systems officer entrusted with the responsibility of wholesale market and operations, Telecom Italia Sparkle, INWIT, TIM San Marino, TN Fiber, Flash Fiber and Persidera. In 2018 he started his career in TIM as chief infrastructure officer of the group

== Founder of Rari Nantes ==
In 2021 he founded Rari Nantes, an innovative investment player providing transformational capital to mid-sized companies. Rari Nantes team is focused in unlocking value in idiosyncratic opportunities which other investors are unable or unwilling to tackle by structurally improving the strategic position, competitiveness, and profitability of invested companies. Targets have revenues above €50millions with healthy core, often profitable or with strong potential for capital appreciation, but, also, either unable to fund growth due to current interest rates, or in a situation of underperformance due to weaker management skills or in a succession phase, need of strategic repositioning, balance sheet distress, which demonstrate an untapped development potential or the opportunity for a fundamental transition

First fund was launched in 2022 in Europe. Second fund is being launched in Italy in 2023. Capital has been raised globally but will be invested in mid-sized companies headquartered in Italy, also engaging institutional investors, key family offices and relevant Italian companies

== Academic roles ==
Since 2023 he is member of the scientific advisory board of EY- Ernst and Young

Since 2019 he is member of the advisory board of Luiss Business School University.

Since 2017 he is member of the advisory board of LUMSA University.

Since 2014 he is adjunct professor at Luiss University in the Digital business transformation course and in the Corporate Strategy and M&A course

== Boards and other ==
From 2021 to 2022 he was board member of Noovle the cloud company acting as Center of Excellence supporting the digital transformation of Italian public and private companies.

From 2018 till 2021 he was member of the board of Persidera, Italian independent digital terrestrial television network operator

In 2018 and 2019 Siragusa is chairman of the board of directors and chairman of the strategic committee of INWIT, public listed company that operates in the field of communications infrastructure.

In 2018 and 2019 he is chairman of the board of directors of TI Sparkle, global telecommunication service provider.

In 2017 he is member of the board of directors, chairman of remuneration and nomination committee and a member of the risk and related party committee of the ENAV, the Italian air navigation service provider.

In 2016 he is member of the board of directors for the IPO of ENAV SpA, the Italian air navigation service provider

In 2015 and 2016 he is chairman of the board of directors of Metro 5 SpA., the underground light metro^{[2]} line in Milan, Italy

In 2015 and 2016 he is the member of the board of directors and member of the governance committee of Saipem SpA., player in engineering, drilling and construction of major projects in the energy and infrastructure sectors

In 2015 and 2016 he is member of the board of directors of Marangoni SpA., developer and distributor of materials and technologies for the cold retreading of truck and bus tyres.

== Publications ==
- M.IT: Develop Lean MES solutions within a pharmaceutical company, 2001
- AEI – ANIE: Lean and Just in time control policies in tire production lines: a statistical comparison, 2000
- INTERNATIONAL BIAS: Advanced Kanban in Lean Production: a mathematical perspective, 2000
