= Ghana Satellite Earth Station =

Largest satellite station in Ghana

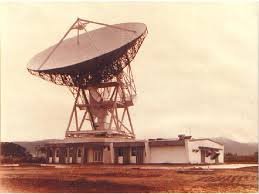
- Organization: Vodafone Ghana
- Location: Kuntunse, Greater Accra Region, Ga West Municipal Assembly, Ghana
- Coordinates: 5°45′01″N 0°18′19″W
- Telescopes: AVN-Ghana 32m telescope
- Location of Ghana Satellite Earth Station
- Related media on Commons

The Ghana Satellite Earth Station, now The Ghana Radio Astronomy Observatory (GRAO), is the largest satellite station in Ghana and hosts the largest steerable single-dish radio telescope in Africa. The satellite station is situated at Kuntunse, on the Accra - Nsawam Road, a suburb of Accra in the Greater Accra Region. The satellite station has five receiver dishes:

- One main dish- 32 m
- Two medium dishes
- Two small dishes

== History ==
The station originally commissioned in 1981, is managed by the Ghana Space Science and technology Institute, following its release from Vodafone company back to the Ghana government, and subsequently to the Institute under the Ghana Atomic Energy Commission.

In 2017, it was announced the 32-meter (105 feet) former communications antenna had begun operations as an astronomical radio telescope. The telescope's "first light" science observations included methanol maser detections, pulsar observations and VLBI fringe testing. Early science results were announced in 2026.

== Land and Security Challenges ==
The Ghana Radio Astronomy Observatory at Kuntunse has experienced significant encroachment on its originally state-acquired land, which has been reduced from 163 acres to approximately 30 acres over the past four decades. This encroachment has resulted in the construction of buildings and the presence of household electronic devices near the facility, which interfere with the observatory's radio signal reception and restrict the effective operational range of its telescopes. The Ghana Atomic Energy Commission and Ghana Space Science and Technology Institute have raised concerns about the impact of these developments on the observatory's research capabilities and its role in global space science. In response, the government has deployed military personnel to secure the site and has funded the construction of defensive perimeter walls, including a GH¢1 million fence around the remaining land, to prevent further encroachment. These measures aim to preserve the observatory's functionality and safeguard Ghana's investment in space science infrastructure.
