= Nick Read =

British businessman (born 1964)

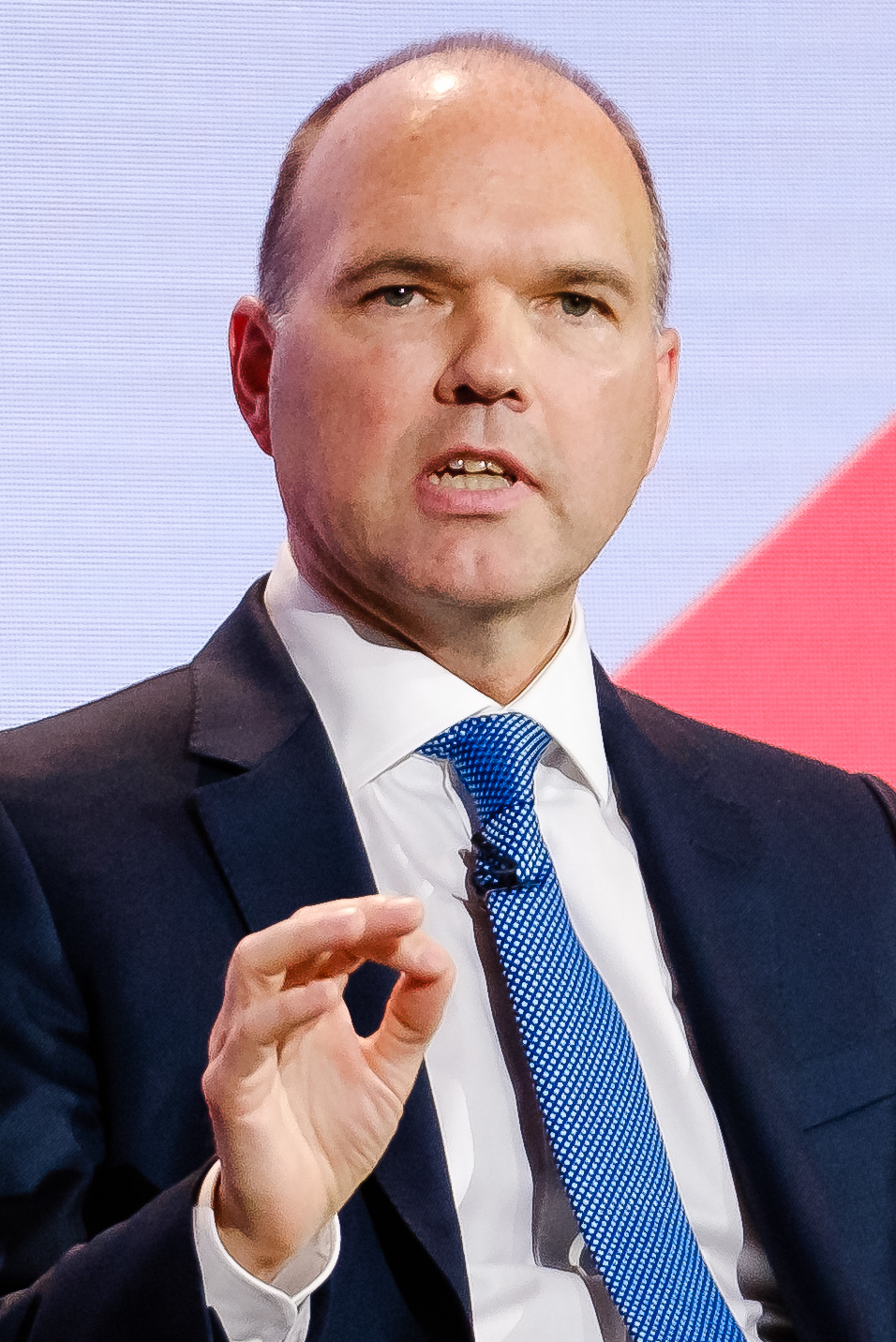
- Nick Read in 2020
- Born: Nicholas Jonathan Read; 29 September 1964 (age 61)
- Education: Manchester Metropolitan University
- Occupation: Businessman
- Title: CEO, Vodafone
- Term: October 2018 – December 2022
- Predecessor: Vittorio Colao
- Successor: Margherita Della Valle

Nicholas Jonathan Read (born 29 September 1964) is a British businessman who was the CEO of Vodafone Group plc from October 2018 to December 2022. Read currently works as a senior advisor for Global Infrastructure Partners (GIP) and is chairman of EXA Infrastructure. He is also a non-executive director for Booking.com.

== Education ==
Read attended Manchester Metropolitan University, where he earned a BA (Hons) degree in Accounting and Finance in 1986. He is a Fellow Chartered Management Accountant and a Chartered Global Management Accountant (CGMA).

In 2022, Read was the recipient of an Honorary Doctor of Business Administration degree from Manchester Metropolitan University.

== Career ==
Read worked for Federal Express Corporation in the UK, Belgium and the United States. He also worked at United Business Media, performing divisional CFO roles in both companies.

While Read was serving as CFO for Vizzavi in 2001, Vodafone bought out its joint venture partner, Vivendi Universal, and subsequently merged Vizzavi's operations with Vodafone. Read became the CFO for Vodafone's UK business in 2002 and then CCO in 2003. On 1 May 2006, he became the CEO of Vodafone UK.

In 2008, Read became the Group's Chief Executive for the Africa, Middle East and Asia region. In this role he became a board member of numerous Vodafone subsidiaries, joint ventures and minority positions. They included China Mobile, Vodacom Group, Safaricom plc, Vodafone Egypt, Vodafone Qatar, Indus Towers, Vodafone India, Vodafone Hutchinson Australia, and VodafoneZiggo.

In 2014, Read became the CFO of Vodafone Group plc and joined the company's main board. He was appointed Group CEO four years later in October 2018. In his role as CEO, he became a United Nations Broadband Commissioner and HeForShe alliance champion. Read also joined the board of Booking Holdings Inc as a non-executive director in 2018 and member of the audit committee. In December 2022, it was announced that Read would be stepping down as Group CEO of Vodafone; he remained as an advisor to Vodafone's board until 31 March 2023. Read joined the supervisory board at Manchester Metropolitan University in April 2023.

Since Vodafone, Read has focused on global digital infrastructure investments and in June 2023, was appointed chairman of EXA Infrastructure. EXA has a fibre network spanning EMEA, across the Atlantic, and on the east coast of the United States, providing connectivity to hyperscalers, telecom operators, governments and large enterprises. In September 2023, Read was appointed as a senior advisor to Global Infrastructure Partners, a leading infrastructure fund with $100 billion under management. He continues to serve as non-executive director at Booking.com.
