= Dolf van den Brink =

Dutch businessman (born 1973)

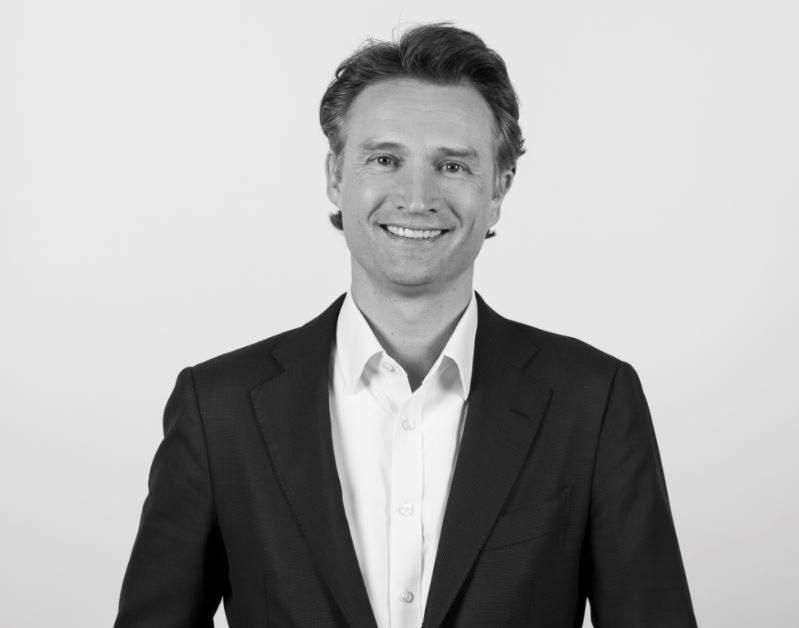
- Born: 1973 (age 51–52); Bussum, Netherlands
- Occupation: Manager
- Known for: CEO of Heineken N.V.
- Predecessor: Jean-François van Boxmeer

Dolf van den Brink (born 1973) is a Dutch businessman who is the chief executive officer and chairman of the executive board at Heineken N.V.

== Early and personal life ==
Van den Brink was born in 1973 in Bussum, Netherlands. He has an MSc degree in business administration and an MA in philosophy from the University of Groningen.

He is married with two daughters.

== Career ==
Dolf van den Brink is the chief executive officer and chairman of the executive board at Heineken N.V. since 1 June 2020. He succeeded Jean-François van Boxmeer. Prior to this Dolf van den Brink was President of the Asia Pacific region and member of the Executive Team at Heineken N.V.
