= Patricia Obo-Nai =

Ghanaian telecommunications engineer

- Born: Ghana
- Education: St Roses Senior High
- Alma mater: Kwame Nkrumah University of Science and Technology (BSc.Electrical engineering), University of Ghana (MBA); Kellogg School of Management; INSEAD
- Occupations: Business and Technology Executive
- Employers: Tigo Ghana; Vodafone Ghana; Telecel Ghana
- Awards: Ghana Women of Excellence Awards (2020); Telecom CEO of the Year (2020)

Patricia Obo-Nai is a Ghanaian engineer, the first Ghanaian to become Chief Executive Officer of Vodafone Ghana. Her appointment on 19 February 2019 took effect on 1 April 2019. She is a member of the Ghana Institution of Engineers, (GHIE) and Vodafone's executive committee. In May 2021, she was named among the top 50 Most Influential Female Leaders in Africa within the corporate and business sphere by Leading Ladies Africa.

== Education ==
Patricia Obo-Nai attended Bishop Bowers School for her basic education. For her O-Levels and A-Levels, she attended St Roses Senior High (Akwatia) and the Presbyterian Boys' Senior High School respectively. She continued at the Kwame Nkrumah University of Science and Technology where she obtained a bachelor's degree in electrical engineering. She holds an Executive MBA and Executive Education degree from the University of Ghana and Kellogg School of Management in USA respectively. She also acquired an Executive Education degree from INSEAD in France.

== Career ==
Patricia Obo-Nai has worked in information technology and telecommunications since 1997. Before her appointment at Vodafone, she worked with Millicom Ghana Limited, operators of Tigo for 14 years. In 2011, she moved on to join Vodafone as a Chief Technology Officer and a member of the Executive Committee. She was later promoted as the Director of Fixed Business and Customer Operations before she was appointed as CEO in 2019.

She has served on a number of boards which includes the following: an advisory council member of the West African STEM Hub, advisory member of the Global Young Academy, Board member of the KNUST Foundation, a member of the Ghana Institute of Engineers and the Executive Women Network.

== Awards and honours ==
For her work she has received the following awards:

- 2012 - Best Female Technologist Award at the annual Ghana Telecom Awards in June
- 2017 - Distinguished Alumnus from the College of Engineering at KNUST
- 2018 - Listed as one of the 100 most inspiring women leaders in Vodafone
- 2019 - Won the Presec "Odade3" Honorary Torch Award
- 2020 - Ghana Women of Excellence Awards
- 2020 National Communications Awards Telecommunications Personality of the Year
- 2020 Sustainability and Social Impact (SSI) Awards STEM Leadership Award
- 2020 Ghana Information Technology and Telecom Awards (GITTA) Telecom CEO of the Year
- 2020 Young Professional Role Model in Women Executive Leadership Award
- 2021 Women Leadership Excellence Award at Ghana CEO’s Network Summit
- 2021 Africa’s Most Respected CEO Awards in the continent’s Telecommunications Industry
- 2022- Marketing Woman of the year at the Chartered Institute of Marketing, Ghana(CIMG) Annual National Awards.

== Personal life ==
Patricia is married with three (3) children.
