= Telecel Ghana =

Telecommunications Company in Ghana

- Type: Private
- Industry: Telecommunications
- Predecessor: Vodafone Ghana
- Key people: Patricia Obo-Nai
- Website: telecel.com.gh

Telecel Ghana is the Ghanaian subsidiary of Telecel Group, an African focused telecommunications company. They are the leading total communications solutions provider. In February 2023, Telecel Group completed a deal to acquire 70% shares of Vodafone Ghana in Ghana Telecom Company Limited and effectively rebranded Vodafone Ghana into Telecel Ghana.

In February 2024, Telecel Ghana announced immense network expansion in Ghana by adding 300 new 4G sites in record time.

== Internet disruption ==
In March 2024, the company lost internet connectivity due to a cut in their undersea cables. and this led to the disruption of services on fixed and mobile networks. Later, they secured internet capacity through local and international partners.

== Leadership ==
As of March 2024, Patricia Obo-Nai is the chief executive officer for the company.

== Telecel Ghana Foundation ==
On December 14, 2024, Telecel Ghana Foundation concluded the first term of its DigiTech Academy at St. Cecilia Roman Catholic JHS in Ho, focusing on STEM education with hands-on training in web development, IoT, robotics, and programming.
