= Vantage Towers =

European infrastructure company

Vantage Towers AG
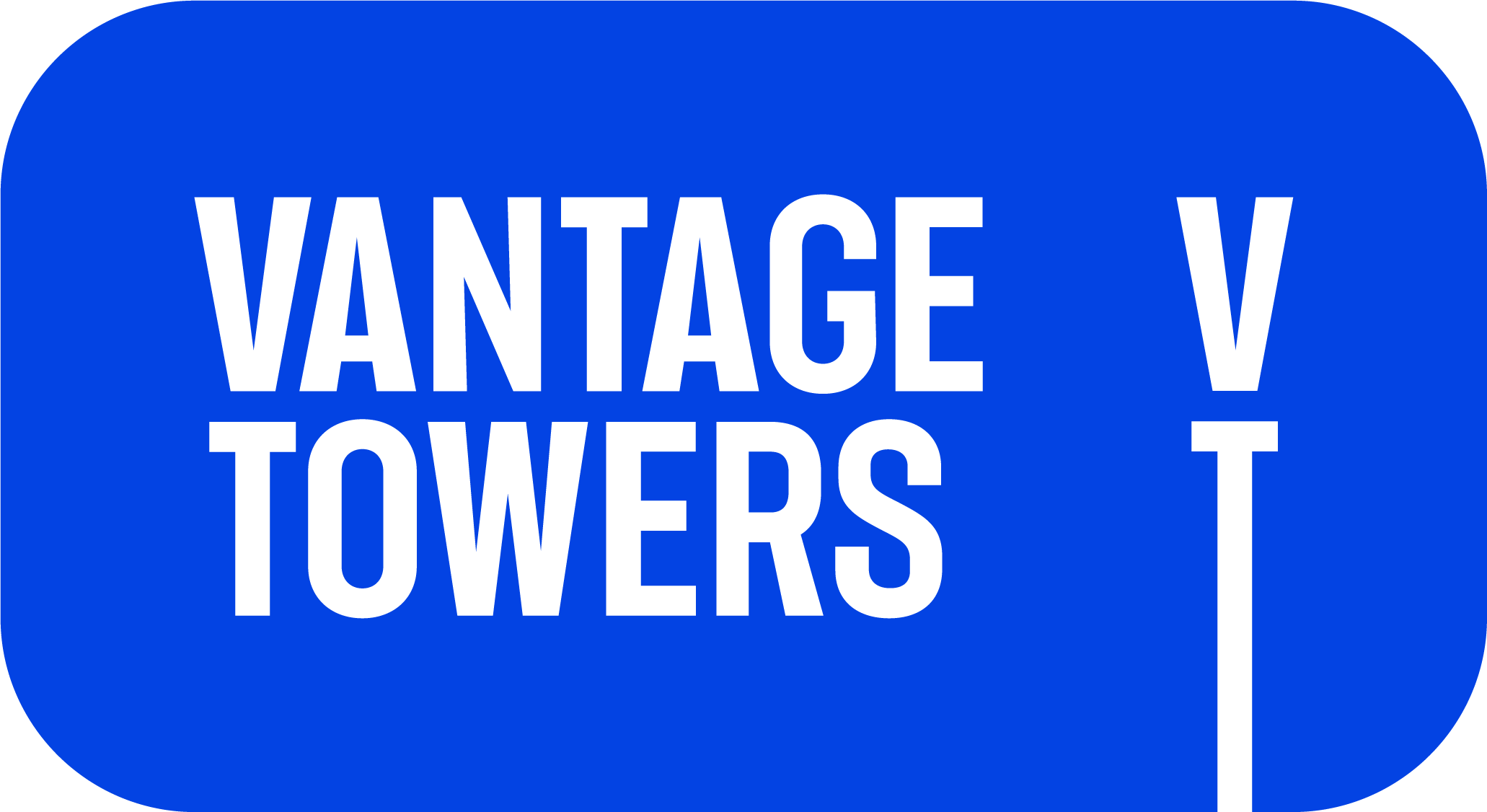

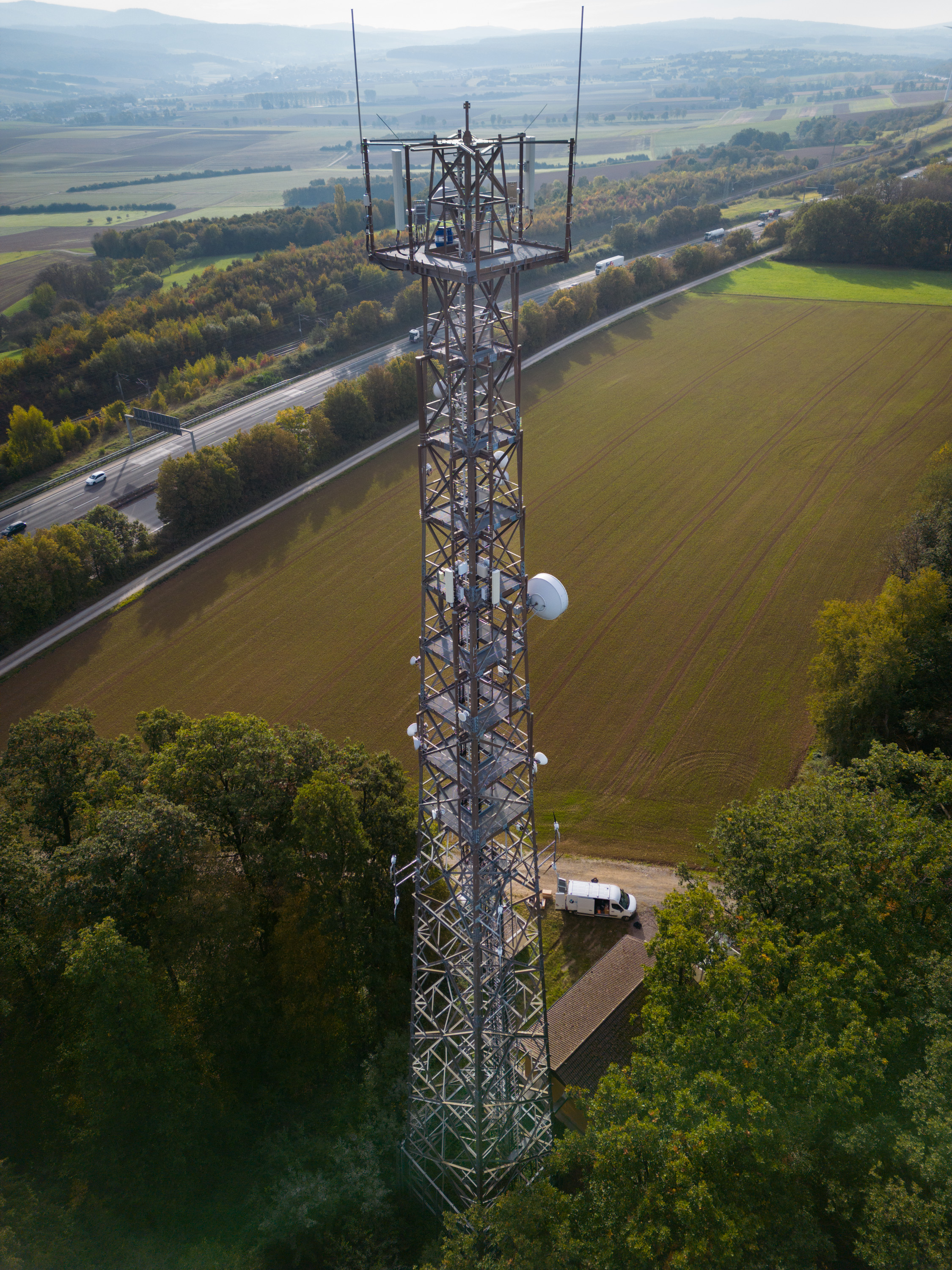
- Vantage Towers site near Bad Camberg
- Type: Private
- Industry: Telecommunications
- Founded: May 2020; 6 years ago
- Founder: Vodafone Group
- Headquarters: Düsseldorf, Germany
- Number of locations: 87,824 (2025)
- Area served: Portugal; Czech Republic; Germany; Greece; Hungary; Ireland; Italy; Romania; Spain
- Key people: Martin Bouchard (CEO); Nicolas Mahler (CFO)
- Products: Telecommunications infrastructures
- Revenue: ▲€665.9 million (Vantage Towers AG standalone) (2024/25)
- Net income: €0 (2024/25) (2024/25)
- Total assets: €12,282.3 million (Vantage Towers AG standalone) (2024/25)
- Owner: Oak Holdings
- Number of employees: ▲711 (2022/23)
- Parent: Vodafone Group; GIP; KKR
- Subsidiaries: INWIT (37.61%)
- Website: www.vantagetowers.com
- Footnotes; Annual Report 2022/23

Vantage Towers is a European infrastructure company headquartered in Düsseldorf, Germany. The company is involved in the construction, management, and leasing of towers, antenna masts, and other facilities to mobile network operators.

Previously, Vantage Towers was a subsidiary of the British telecommunications company Vodafone Group and was listed on the stock exchange from 2021 to 2023. In terms of sites and turnover, Vantage Towers is among the largest infrastructure companies in Europe.

== History ==
In July 2019, the British Vodafone Group announced the creation of a new business unit that would include the Group's cell towers and masts. This move was part of the broader trend towards separating passive infrastructure and active network components in mobile networks. The infrastructure company was headquartered in Germany. Vantage Towers began operating in May 2020.

In 2020, Vodafone Group declared its intention to list its subsidiary on the stock exchange. The IPO took place in March 2021; approximately one-fifth of the shares were initially sold, with a total market value of €2.2 billion. The proceeds enabled the Vodafone Group to reduce its debt level. Concurrently, Vantage Towers obtained the requisite capital to facilitate its global expansion, for example in Greece.

In early 2022, preliminary indications emerged that a number of institutional investors were expressing interest in Vantage Towers. In December, the management board recommended that the acquisition offer from Oak Holdings be accepted. Oak Holdings is a joint venture of the Vodafone Group, GIP and KKR. Following the acquisition of more than 80% of Vantage Towers shares by Oak Holdings in November 2022, the company was delisted in May 2023. As of March 2025, Oak Holdings holds approximately 89.32% of Vantage Towers shares.

== Business activities ==
Vantage Towers currently operates 87,824 sites in ten European countries (as of March 2025). The largest markets are those of Germany, Spain and Greece.

The company's principal objective is to construct, operate and subsequently lease passive network infrastructure for mobile communications. This includes ground-based tower sites (GBT) and rooftop tower sites (RTT), as well as so-called smart cells for tunnels, larger buildings, and other environments. The company provides additional services, from site operation to maintenance.

Vantage Towers leases its infrastructure to telecommunications companies, energy suppliers and IoT providers. As part of this business model, competitors usually are sharing sites. In most markets, the company's customers includes all of the country's major mobile network operators. Accordingly, the company characterizes itself as a neutral host.

== Joint ventures and associates ==
Vantage Towers has significant stakes in two other tower companies based in the UK and Italy: Cornerstone (50% as of March 2025) and INWIT (37.61% as of March 2025).

=== Cornerstone ===
Cornerstone is a private company with 325 employees as of March 2025. Cornerstone was started as a joint venture between Vodafone Group and Telefónica UK on 29 May 2012. Then on 14 January 2021 half of the company was acquired by Vantage Towers for an undisclosed amount. Cornerstone currently manages approximately 15,844 sites across the United Kingdom.

=== INWIT ===
INWIT was originally founded in 2015 as a spin-off of Telecom Italia's (TIM) tower assets. Vantage Towers began their involvement from a 2020 merger in which Vodafone Italy combined its own tower infrastructure with INWIT to create Italy's largest tower operator. As part of this consolidation, Vodafone acquired a co-controlling stake in the combined entity, which was subsequently transformed into Vantage Towers. INWIT has approximately 25,000 macro sites as of March 2025.

=== Tenancy ratios ===
The tenancy ratio is defined as the total number of tenancies (including physical and active sharing tenancies) on macro sites divided by the total number of macro sites.

As of 31 March 2025, the average tenancy ratio in the consolidated markets was 1.53x, up from 1.50x as of 31 March 2024.

The following table shows the tenancy ratios by market segment as of 31 March 2025 compared to 31 March 2024:

Market	31 March 2025	31 March 2024
Germany	1.30x	1.26x
Spain	1.92x	1.91x
Greece	1.79x	1.74x
Other European Markets	1.53x	1.50x
Total	1.53x	1.50x

For associates and joint ventures (as reported):

Market	31 March 2025	31 March 2024
Italy (INWIT)	2.32x	2.23x
United Kingdom (Cornerstone)	1.90x	1.91x
