= Jean-François van Boxmeer =

Belgian businessman

- Born: 12 September 1961 (age 64); Ixelles, Belgium
- Education: Facultés universitaires Notre-Dame de la Paix
- Occupation: Businessman
- Title: Chairman & CEO, Heineken International (2005–2020)
- Term: 2005–2020
- Board member of: Mondelēz International; Heineken International

Jean-François van Boxmeer (born 12 September 1961) is a Belgian businessman, and was the chairman of the executive board and chief executive officer (CEO) of Heineken International. In June 2020 Jean-François van Boxmeer was succeeded as CEO of Heineken International by Dolf van den Brink.

== Early life and education ==
Van Boxmeer was born on 12 September 1961 in Ixelles, Belgium. He received a master's degree in economics from the Facultés universitaires Notre-Dame de la Paix in Namur, Belgium in 1984.

== Career ==
Van Boxmeer joined Heineken International in 1984, when he worked as a trainee in the Netherlands until 1987. He then worked for Heineken in Rwanda, the Democratic Republic of the Congo, Poland and Italy. He served as general manager of Heineken Italia from 2000 to 2001, and has been on its board of directors since 2001. In 2005, he was appointed chairman of the board and CEO. He oversaw the control of Asia Pacific Breweries. He believes the two key markets are Africa and India. At the 2011 World Economic Forum in Davos, Switzerland, he said Nigeria was safer than Greece in terms of investments.

== Other activities ==
=== Corporate boards ===
- Vodafone Group PLC, Chair of the Board (since 2020)
- Henkel, Member of the Shareholders' Committee (since 2013)
- Mondelēz International, Member of the Board of Directors (since 2010)

=== Non-profit organizations ===
- European Round Table of Industrialists (ERT), Member
- Consumer Goods Forum, Member of the Board of Directors
- De Nederlandse Opera, Member of the Board of Governors
- Louvain School of Management, Member of the Advisory Board
