= Gerry Whent =

British business executive

Sir Gerald Whent CBE
- Born: Gerald Arthur Whent; March 1, 1927; Ferozepore, British India
- Died: May 16, 2002 (aged 75); Chilton Foliat, Wiltshire, England
- Occupation: Businessman
- Employer(s): Racal Electronics, Vodafone
- Known for: Founding CEO of Vodafone
- Title: Chief Executive Officer of Vodafone
- Term: 1984–1996
- Successor: Chris Gent
- Awards: Commander of the Order of the British Empire (CBE)

Sir Gerald Arthur "Gerry" Whent CBE (1 March 1927 in Ferozepore, India – 16 May 2002 in Chilton Foliat, Wiltshire) was the founder and first chief executive of Vodafone.

== Early life ==
Gerald Arthur Whent was the youngest of four children of Major Albert Whent, of the Royal Artillery stationed in Palestine from 1938. Whent was educated at St Mary's College, Southampton.

== Career ==
In 1980, Ernest Harrison, chairman of Racal Electronics, the UK's largest maker of military radio technology, agreed a deal with Lord Weinstock of the General Electric Company to allow Racal to access some of GEC's tactical battlefield radio technology. Briefing Whent as the head of Racal's military radio division, Harrison told Whent to drive the company into commercial mobile radio. Whent also visited a factory run by General Electric (unrelated to GEC) in Virginia, USA, in the same year.

In 1982, Racal's newly formed subsidiary Racal Strategic Radio Ltd, with Whent as CEO, won one of two UK cellular telephone network licences; the other going to British Telecom. The network, known as Racal-Vodafone, was 80% owned by Racal, with Millicom and the Hambros Technology Trust owning 15% and 5% respectively. Vodafone was launched on 1 January 1985. Racal Strategic Radio was renamed Racal Telecommunications Group Limited in 1985. On 29 December 1986, Racal Electronics bought out the minority shareholders of Vodafone for £110 million.

Under stock market pressure to realise full value for shareholders (the mobile unit was being valued at the same amount as the whole Racal group), in September 1988, the company was again renamed Racal Telecom, and on 26 October 1988, Racal Electronics floated 20% of the company. The flotation valued Racal Telecom at £1.7 billion. On 16 September 1991, Racal Telecom was demerged from Racal Electronics as Vodafone.

Under Whent, over the next few years Vodafone grew to become the UK's market leader. During his service on the board as CEO, Whent turned Vodafone into a standalone mobile communications business, with a stock market capitalisation of around £8bn.

== Personal life ==
Whent was appointed a CBE and then knighted in the New Year's honours in 1995 for his services to mobile telecommunications. He retired in 1996, after which he undertook varying projects including helping to create a business park on the former site of the Greenham Common air base.

He was married twice. He had a son and daughter with his first wife Coris. He was a keen golf player and a huge fan of horse racing, Vodafone sponsoring The Derby from 1995 until 2005. He also ran Horris Vale Stud and then Raffin Stud with his second wife, Sarah.
