= Infrastrutture Wireless Italiane =

Italian telecommunications infrastructure company

Infrastrutture Wireless Italiane S.p.A.

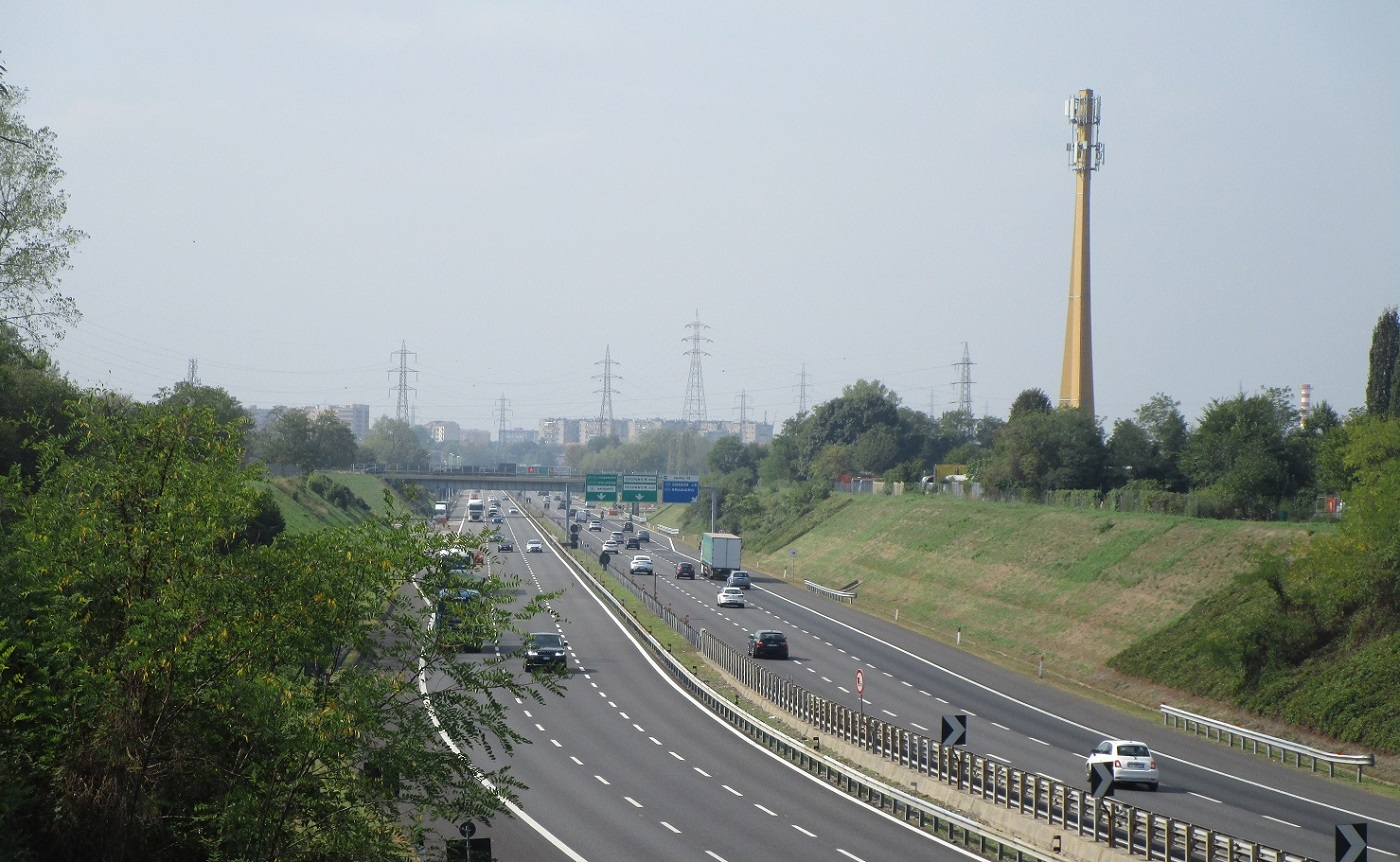
- INWIT - Brugherio's Tower
- Type: Public
- Traded as: BIT: INW; FTSE MIB
- ISIN: IT0005090300
- Industry: Telecommunications
- Founded: January 14, 2015; 11 years ago in Milan, Italy
- Founder: Telecom Italia
- Headquarters: Milan, Italy
- Area served: Italy
- Products: Passive infrastructure for mobile phone technology, broadcasting, radio, other wireless services and private mobile networks. DAS, Small cells.
- Revenue: 785,149,790 (2021)
- Net income: 191,406,641 (2021)
- Owner: TIM (37.513%); Vantage Towers (37.513%)
- Number of employees: 246 (2021)
- Parent: TIM; Vodafone
- Website: www.inwit.it

Infrastrutture Wireless Italiane S.p.A. or INWIT S.p.A., is an Italian public company headquartered in Milan, which operates in the wireless network infrastructure sector.

INWIT is Italy's major Tower Operator, providing widespread coverage across the country and hosting transmission equipment for all main national operators. In addition to hosting telco operators on its towers, INWIT is in the process of setting up a Distributed Antenna System (DAS) network that will guarantee excellent coverage in densely populated urban areas like some of Italy's historic centres and other public areas, as well as in large enclosed areas such as stadiums, railway stations, concert areas, historic villages, museums, hotels.

== History ==
INWIT was founded on January 14, 2015, and has been operational since April 1, 2015 following the spin-off of the "Tower" branch of Telecom Italia. From 22 June 2015 INWIT is listed on the Milan Stock Exchange in the FTSE Italia Mid Cap index. During the initial public offering, the company raised €875.3 million, with a capitalization of around €2.2 billion. Currently the company has achieved a market capitalization of over €5.5 billion.

On March 31, 2020, thanks to an agreement with Vodafone Group, the merger of Vodafone Towers Italia into INWIT was completed.

== Operations ==
In 2018 INWIT confirmed the trend of progressive increase in turnover. Revenue at 31 December 2018 amounted to €378.5 million, up 6.1% compared to the previous year. EBITDA is €215.4 million, up 12.2% compared to the previous year. The 2018 EBIT amounted to 200.3 million euros with an increase of 11.7% compared to the previous year. Net profit amounts to 140.8 million euros, up 11.1% compared to the 2017 figure.

== Competitors ==
INWIT interacts, in the same market, with Rai Way, EI Towers, which is controlled by Mediaset, and Cellnex (Abertis Group).

== Logos ==
2015-2020

2020–present

== See also ==
- TIM Group
- Vodafone Group
