= Fastweb =

Fastweb may refer to:

- Fastweb (website), a free online scholarship search service
- Fastweb (telecommunications company), an Italian broadband telecommunications company
- FASTWeb, an online business documents and services portal, from the First American Corporation
