= Vodafone Ghana =

National telecommunications company of Ghana

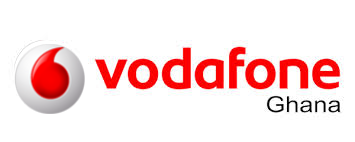
- Type: Private
- Industry: Telecommunication
- Predecessor: Ghana Telecom
- Founded: 1974
- Headquarters: Accra, Ghana
- Key people: Patricia Obo-Nai, CEO
- Products: Fixed Line Telephone Mobile Phone Broadband
- Revenue: US$ 1.2 billion (2006)
- Number of employees: 4,000 (2006)
- Website: vodafone.com.gh

Vodafone Ghana, formerly Ghana Telecom, is the national telecommunications company of Ghana. Vodafone Ghana was fully rebranded from "Vodafone" to "Telecel" in February, 2024 and now known as Telecel Ghana.

As of January 2020, it had around 9.3 million mobile voice subscribers, representing 13.81% of the Ghanaian market shares. The Ghana Satellite Earth Station has been operated by Vodafone Ghana since it took over as the majority shareholder in 2008.

Patricia Obo-Nai was appointed as the first Ghanaian female CEO of Vodafone Ghana. They were certified by the Top Employers Institute as a Top Employer in Africa for the third consecutive year in January 2021.

== Vodafone - Ghana Telecom deal ==
On 3 July 2008 it was announced that Vodafone had agreed to acquire 70% of Ghana Telecom from the Ghanaian government at a cost of US$900 million and a total enterprise value of approximately US$1.3 billion.

After the transaction closed, Vodafone had a 70% stake in the company, while the Ghanaian government retained a 30% stake. The acquisition was consummated on 17 August 2008.

The sale was supported by president John Agyekum Kufuor, but strongly opposed by the opposition party, which would win the presidential elections a few months later. The new president John Atta Mills, head of the National Democratic Congress party (NDC) also launched an investigation into the deal after being elected president a claiming that the government "did not get value for money".

Despite these claims, a few months later Vodafone would write down the value of its stake in Ghana Telecom by £250m as the economic climate worsened, damaging the business's prospects.

On 15 April 2009, Ghana Telecom, along with its mobile subsidiary OneTouch, was rebranded as Vodafone Ghana.

In 2016, Vodafone Ghana was the country's second largest operator with a market share for April 2016 as 21.92% and 25.32% of data behind African communications giant MTN Ghana.

In December 2019, Vodafone Ghana announced its acquisition of all of the Vodacom Group's stake in Vodacom Business Ghana.

In February 2023, Vodafone Group has concluded the sale of its 70% stake in Vodafone Ghana to Telecel Group in a bid to streamline its African portfolio.

== Philanthropy ==
Vodafone Ghana was recognized as the top Philanthropic and Health Support Institution by Media Men Ghana at the 2017 People's Choice Practitioners Honours.

The company, in collaboration with British Council, established the Vodafone Scholar Project which will provide full and partial scholarships to female high school and undergraduate students studying STEM subjects who don't have the financial means to pursue continued study.

In 2016, Vodafone made a deal with Kwame Nkrumah University of Science and Technology (KNUST). In the agreement, the company agreed to provide an enhanced high speed internet and Wi-Fi connectivity to all faculties across the university's campuses in Ghana.

== See also ==
- Telecommunications in Ghana
