= Telecel Group =

African telecommunications company

- Founded: 1986
- Headquarters: London, United Kingdom
- Key people: Moh Damush (CEO)
- Website: telecelgroup.com

Telecel Group is a global telecommunications company operating primarily across Africa, with businesses spanning mobile services, wholesale connectivity, fintech, and innovation platforms. The group also engages in philanthropic work. It was founded in 1986 by Rwandan businessman Miko Rwayitare.

== History ==
Telecel, the predecessor to the Telecel Group was founded in 1986. From 2017 to 2018, the group was created, with Telecel Central Africa Republic and Telecel Global acquired. From 2021 to 2022, Telecel Liberia and Telecel Gibraltar were also acquired. From 2023 to 2025, Telecel Ghana, Telecel Guinea-Bissau and Telecel Democratic Republic of Congo were also added to the group.

== Coverage ==
The group currently has coverage in 5 African countries consisting of Telecel Ghana, Telecel Guinea Bissau, Telecel Central African Republic, Telecel Liberia and Telecel Democratic Republic of Congo. It also owns Telecel Global.

Country	Subscribers	Notes
Ghana	9,191,104 voice subscribers as at July 2026	Joined group in 2023 following the acquisition of 70% stake in Vodafone Ghana.
Liberia	Not published	–
Guinea Bissau	Not published	Joined group in 2024 following the acquisition of Spacetel Guinea-Bissau S.A. (MTN Guinea-Bissau).
Central African Republic	Not published	–
DR Congo	Not published	–
Gibraltar	Not published	Joined group in 2019, following the acquisition of mobile operator Limba.
