= Telecommunications in Egypt =

Telecommunications in Egypt began in 1854 with the inauguration of the first telegraph lines between the governorates of Cairo and Alexandria under the Egyptian Telegraph and Telephone Authority, while 1881 saw the installation of the first telephone line between the two governorates.

Egypt has long been the cultural and informational centre of the Middle East and North Africa, and Cairo is the region's largest publishing and broadcasting centre. The telecommunications industry in Egypt has benefited from effective competition and progressive government policies aimed at comprehensive digital transformation. A liberal regulatory environment permits operators to offer both fixed-line and mobile services under unified licenses. Major players in the market include Telecom Egypt, Vodafone, Orange, Etisalat Egypt, and Ericsson.

The Egypt ICT market is projected to grow from an estimated $23.60 billion in 2025 to $53.11 billion by 2030, at a compound annual growth rate of 17.61%. This expansion is driven by rising government investments, increasing internet and mobile penetration, a burgeoning tech startup ecosystem, and ongoing technological advancements. The government's commitment to digital transformation and infrastructure development positions Egypt's ICT sector as a pivotal contributor to the nation's economic growth and modernization efforts.

Between 2019 and 2022, mobile internet subscriptions rose by 77.9 percent, from 39 million to 69.4 million. By December 2023, mobile subscriptions reached 106.2 million. As of January 2024, Egypt's internet penetration rate reached 72.2%, with approximately 82 million internet users. Additionally, Egypt’s smartphone market is projected to generate $3.5 billion in revenue by 2025, with an annual growth rate of 6.11% between 2025 and 2029. Notably, Egypt achieved the fastest internet speed on the African continent in 2022.

== History ==
The origins of telecommunications in Egypt traces back to 1854 when the British Eastern Telegraph Company constructed a telegraph line between Cairo and the Alexandria. Egypt's first telephone line was installed between Cairo and Alexandria in 1881, and later that year, the Egyptian government acquired the Eastern Telephone Company, establishing the Telephone and Telegraph Authority.

In 1957, Law No. 107 transferred the assets of the Eastern Telegraph Company and other telecom providers to the Ministry of Telecommunications. Presidential Decree No. 709 of the same year placed all wire and wireless communications under the jurisdiction of the Wire and Wireless Communications Authority, which reported to the Ministry of Transport.

In 1980, the Arab Republic of Egypt National Telecommunications Organization (ARENTO) was formed as an autonomous public utility under the Ministry of Transport. Under Law No. 19 of 1998, ARENTO was renamed Telecom Egypt and restructured as a joint stock company, with the Egyptian government retaining full ownership.

The liberalization of Egypt’s telecommunications sector began in 1998 and progressed gradually over the following decades. The private sector played an increasing role in mobile telephony and internet services, contributing to the sector’s expansion. In 2004, the Information Technology Industry Development Agency (ITIDA) was established under Law 15 to support Egypt’s digital transformation. ITIDA was tasked with implementing e-signature legislation and promoting an export-oriented IT sector. Over the years, it played a critical role in advancing e-business services, facilitating digital security measures, and supporting Egypt’s ICT-driven economic development.

The market underwent official deregulation in 2006 following Egypt’s commitment to the World Trade Organization Information Technology Agreement in 2003. This move aimed to open the telecommunications market, encourage competition, and attract foreign investment. In 2007, Egypt had approximately 10 million fixed phone lines, 31 million mobile phones, and 8.1 million internet users.

Egypt's ICT sector has experienced significant growth in recent years, consistently outpacing the nation's overall economic expansion. In the fiscal year 2022/2023, the sector achieved a growth rate of 15.2%, contributing 5.1% to Egypt's Gross Domestic Product (GDP). This marks an increase from a 4.4% contribution in 2019/2020. Total investments in the ICT sector reached approximately $4.2 billion in 2022/2023, reflecting a 20% increase from the previous fiscal year.

== Digital Egypt ==
In line with the Egypt Vision 2030 strategy, the country has launched the Digital Egypt initiative, aiming to transform the nation into a digitally-driven society. This comprehensive plan focuses on developing robust digital infrastructure, fostering innovation, and enhancing public services through digital means. A key component of this initiative is the Digital Egypt e-platform, which offers citizens access to a wide range of government services online, including traffic management, real estate registration, and social housing applications. The platform's goal is to streamline service delivery, reduce bureaucratic hurdles, and promote transparency within governmental operations.

Complementing the Digital Egypt initiative are various e-government programs designed to modernize public administration and improve service accessibility. The government has prioritized the digital transformation of public services, resulting in the integration of approximately 33,000 institutions into a secured government network. This network facilitates efficient data exchange between agencies, enhancing coordination and service delivery. Additionally, efforts have been made to train civil servants in digital competencies, ensuring the sustainability and effectiveness of e-government services. These initiatives collectively aim to create a more citizen-centric approach to governance, leveraging technology to meet the evolving needs of the population.

== Telecommunication in Egypt ==
=== Radio ===
See also Egyptian Radio and Television Union & List of radio stations in Egypt

The first radio service in Egypt began in 1925. It is almost all government controlled, using 44 short-wave frequencies, 18 medium-wave stations, and four FM stations. There are seven regional radio stations covering the country. Egyptian Radio transmits 60 hours daily overseas in 33 languages and three hundred hours daily within Egypt. In 2000, Radio Cairo introduced new specialized (thematic) channels on its FM station. So far, they include news, music, and sports. Radio enjoys more freedom than TV in its news programs, talk shows and analysis.

Starting 2003, Nile Radio Productions, a private company, was given license to operate two radio stations; Nile FM and Nogoum FM. Nile FM broadcasts in English and Nogoom FM broadcasts in Egyptian. Both stations mostly broadcast mainly to the Greater Cairo region. In the early 2009, Radio Masr was launched, broadcasting popular Egyptian songs, news & other programs.

=== Television ===
See also Television in Egypt

Egyptian ground-broadcast television (ERTU) is government controlled and depends heavily on commercial revenue. ETV sells its specially produced programs and soap operas to the entire Arab world. ETV has two main channels, six regional channels, and three satellite channels. Of the two main channels, Channel I uses mainly Arabic, while Channel II is dedicated to foreigners and more cultured viewers, broadcasting news in English and French as well as Arabic.

Egyptian Satellite channels broadcast to the Middle East, Europe, and the U.S. East Coast. In April 1998, Egypt launched its own satellite known as NileSat 101. Seven specialized channels cover news, culture, sports, education, entertainment, health, and drama. A second, digital satellite, Nilesat 102, was launched in August 2000. Many of its channels are rented to other stations.

Three new private satellite-based TV stations were launched in November 2001, marking a great change in Egyptian government policy. Dream TV 1 and 2 produce cultural programming, broadcast contemporary video clips and films featuring Arab and international actors, as well as soap operas; another private station focuses on business and general news. Both private channels transmit on NileSat.

In addition to Egyptian programming, the Middle East Broadcast Company, a Saudi television station transmitting from London (MBC), Arab Radio and Television (ART), Al-Jazeera television, and other Gulf stations as well as Western networks such as CNN and BBC, provide access to more international programs to Egyptians who own satellite receivers.

=== Landline telephony ===
See also Telephone numbers in Egypt

Currently, there is a single company in charge of landline telephony, Telecom Egypt which is also government-controlled.

=== Cellular communications ===
See also Telephone numbers in Egypt

Currently, there are four companies which offer cellular communication service: Orange, Vodafone, Etisalat, and We (by Telecom Egypt). These companies also provide services surpassing voice communication, such as 4G, 3G, and mobile internet.

=== Internet ===
The Internet companies market is dealt to two: infrastructure providers and service providers. List following goes in most used.

- WE / Telecom Egypt
- Orange DSL
- Vodafone Egypt
- E& Egypt (Etisalat Egypt)

There are 8 major service provider which sell their services to smaller ISPs. The highest available speed through ADSL technologies was upgraded to 8 Mb in download in February 2008 and then to 24 Mb later that year. The Egyptian ISP market is not competitive, at least in Cairo and Alexandria, with only 3 ISPs offering below-average speeds(Up to 16 Mbit/s).

Orascom, one of the shareholders in the leading cellular operator MobiNil, is also the biggest player in the Internet service provision market and owns 75 per cent of one of Egypt's largest ISP, LINKdotNET. The tie-up with the mobile operator is significant in that WAP services were introduced in May for a trial period, making Egypt one of the first countries in Africa to have introduced WAP.

NileOnline and Egynet has been recently sold to Etisalat, increasing Etisalat access into the broadband market. with this acquisition all class I tier ISPs mentioned above are owned by the major telecommunication companies operating in the country.

Raya is owned by Vodafone Egypt, Nileonline and Egynet are now owned by Etisalat, TEdata is owned and operated by the oldest telecom company in the region telecom Egypt and link.net is owned by Orascom telecom.

== Communication companies in Egypt ==
=== Landline telephony service ===
- Telecom Egypt

=== Cellular communication service ===
- Orange
- Vodafone
- Etisalat
- Telecom Egypt
- WE

== See also ==
- Mass media in Egypt
- Internet in Egypt
