= List of radio stations in Egypt =

Radio broadcasting in Egypt began in the 20th century, in 1924 as privately owned and operated community stations. Later, in 1934 private ownership and operation were abolished and radio broadcasting was nationalized ever since.

As of October 2024, stations are broadcast in analog on the FM band and the mediumwave, without any shortwave broadcasts. A DAB+ test has been made in 2022, though no regular broadcasts are made digitally.

By the early 1990s, Egypt had only 4 FM stations in Greater Cairo (2 in Alexandria), but the number increased to 6 in Greater Cairo (4 in Alexandria) by the end of the decade. The increase in the number was merely a rebroadcast of the already AM radio stations. In 2000, AM stations (on the medium wave band) started a phase of simulcasting to FM band, as of 2013, only one or two stations broadcast on AM without FM simulcasts.

All the local radio stations have always been publicly owned, however, state-controlled which make them in practice, state owned, with the exception of the apolitical private radio station at El Gouna resort, named El Gouna Radio ("Lagoon Radio"). All broadcast media are somehow state controlled, even if partly or fully private.

As of 2002, there were only 8 radio stations broadcast on FM to Greater Cairo (6 in Alexandria), none of them was specialized in popular songs. On March 23, 2002, Voice of America (VOA) had changed its shortwave Arabic service to an appealing station for the youth, named Radio Sawa ("Radio Together"), started broadcasting on a more easily receivable MW signal from Cyprus. For the first time, the state allowed Good News to start a joint venture with the state-controlled ERTU, which started a test broadcasting for two popular song stations to Greater Cairo, as of June 2002. The two were Nogoum FM ("Stars FM"; for popular mainly Egyptian songs) and Nile FM (for popular mainly American songs).

== Local stations ==
All local radio stations in Egypt are also simulcast on the series of the satellites (partly private but state controlled), Nilesat at 7 degrees west, except El Gouna Radio.

Local stations are typically broadcast on FM. Very few radio stations use the Radio Data System to broadcast the station name, but receiving the RDS is very rare in FM receivers in Egypt. Very few available mobile phones in Egypt which have an FM receiver, receive the RDS information. 90.9 MHz is the only station to broadcast the current song or show title, but when the title is long, it is partly displayed. All of the radio stations are state-controlled, unless otherwise noted.

=== Greater Cairo ===
Greater Cairo region has the most number of FM stations in Egypt. Most transmissions, FM or TV, are broadcast from Mokattam hills, as they are the most elevated location within Greater Cairo, to make the transmission reach the widest area possible, however, the signals are weakly received farther than 40 kilometers, which makes transmission weak to the most eastern part of New Cairo, the eastern half of Shorouk City, two-thirds of western 6 October City, all of Madinaty, Badr and New Heliopolis.

A few of the following stations are broadcast on other frequencies in other regions in Egypt.

All stations which broadcast popular songs are mainly Egyptian songs with very few Levantine hits (mostly Lebanese) or other North African.

FM stations
Count	Frequency in MHz	Name	Format	Stereo?	Notes
1	87.8	Mix FM	Popular Egyptian, regional songs, and news	yes	Since 2019
2	88.2	Radio Hits	Popular songs with occasional foreign songs, mostly American popular hits	yes	since mid-2010; similar to Radio Masr but with more songs
3	88.7	Radio Masr	Popular songs and news briefs	yes	Since mid-2010, as a test since 2009; RDS; Arabic: راديو مصر
4	89.5	Middle East Radio	Spoken content and songs	yes	Simulcast on the MW band; Arabic: إذاعة الشرق الأوسط
5	90.9	El Radio FM 90 90	Popular songs	yes	since April 2012; RDS; Arabic: الراديو 90 90
6	91.5	Cultural Program	Talk radio, rarely classical music, some affiliate foreign stations programs	no	Arabic: البرنامج الثقافى
7	92.1	NRJ	Popular Egyptian songs mainly	yes	Since 2017; RDS; private
8	92.7	Mega FM	Popular songs and foreign songs, mostly American popular hits	yes	Since mid-2010; RDS
9	93.7	On Sport FM	Sport-related shows	no	Since early 2020s?; initially a rebroadcast for Youth and Sport on 108 MHz from 2009 to 2013
10	95	Shaabi FM	Working class popular Egyptian songs	yes	Initially a rebroadcast for Specialty Song on 105.8 MHz from 2009 to 2013; Arabic: شعبى إف إم
11	95.4	European Program	English, French, Greek, Italian, German – spoken content with western hits	Mono and stereo interchangeably	Arabic: البرنامج الأوروپى
12	98.2	Koran Radio	Quran recitation and Islamic shows	no	Simulcast on the MW band; All Arab League members have a Quran station
13	98.8	Musical Program	Classical international music, folk and old Egyptian songs, soft music and foreign songs (mostly American popular hits)	yes	Arabic: البرنامج الموسيقى
14	99	99 FM	?	?	
15	100.6	Nogoum FM	Popular Egyptian and regional songs with entertainment shows	yes	Since 2002; RDS; joint venture with ERTU; Arabic: نجوم إف إم
16	102.2	Greater Cairo Radio	Talk radio	no	Arabic: إذاعة القاهرة الكبرى
17	102.7	Nile News	Talk radio	yes	As of 2025; formerly broadcast European Program on 95.4 MHz and Greater Cairo Radio on 102.2 from February 2012 till mid-March 2013, off the air in May and June 2013, and off again since mid-August till the early 2020s?; Arabic: النيل للأخبار
18	104.2	Nile FM	Full time English-speaking, occasionally syndicated American and British shows	yes	Since 2002; RDS; joint venture with ERTU
19	105.3	Nagham FM	Popular Egyptian songs	yes	Since 2012; Arabic: نغم إف إم "Tunes FM"
20	105.8	Specialty Songs	Mainly old Egyptian songs	yes	Partly simulcast on the MW band; Arabic: إذاعة الأغانى
21	106.3	Voice of the Arabs	Talk radio	no	A legacy propaganda station of high historical significance in the 1960s on the shortwave and mediumwave; Arabic: صوت العرب
22	107.4	General Program	Talk radio	no	Simulcast on the MW band; Arabic: البرنامج العام
23	108	Youth and Sport	Sport-related shows	no	Simulcast on the MW band; Arabic: إذاعة الشباب و الرياضة

In the following table, far stations receivable at night that are broadcast on a nearby frequency to a local strong station, are omitted since it is normally impossible to receive on ordinary receivers. Likewise, very weak far stations are omitted. When daylight saving time is applicable to the local time in Egypt, an additional hour is added to the time in UTC.

MW stations
Count	Frequency in kHz	Name	Time in UTC	Notes
1	540	Kuwait Main Arabic program	24h	Only receivable at nighttime when the nearby 558 kHz goes off at 22:00 UTC
2	558	Educational program	4:00-22:00	Arabic: الإذاعة التعليمية
3	567	Syrian Radio 1	24h	Only receivable at nighttime when the nearby 558 kHz goes off at 22:00 UTC
4	594	Riyadh Radio	2:30-15:00	Saudi Arabian station; used to be an extension to the broadcast time for the station on 1521 kHz, closed in 2025
5	630	TRT Radyo 1; TRT Çukurova	13:30-21:02, 2:00-6:05; 6:05-9:15	Only receivable at nighttime; 2 Turkish stations sharing the same frequency
6	639	BBC Arabic radio	14:00–14:30, 5:00-5:30	A temporary revival of the pre-2019 BBC AM frequency due to the Gaza war; Arabic: بى بى سى نيوز عربى
7	711	Youth and Sport	24h	Simulcast on the FM band; Arabic: إذاعة الشباب و الرياضة
8	774	Middle East Radio	24h	Simulcast on the FM band; Arabic: إذاعة الشرق الأوسط
9	819	General Program	24h	Simulcast on the FM band; Arabic: البرنامج العام; transmitted from Batrah, Dakahlia with 300 KW power.
10	864	Koran Radio	24h	Simulcast on the FM band; transmitted from Santa, Gharbia with 500 KW power.
11	936	Om Kalthoum Station	15:00-20:00	Named after the singer Om Kalthoum
12	999	Koran Radio	24h	Only receivable at nighttime; a Saudi Arabian station
13	1071	Nile River; Elderly Station	17:00-23:00; 3:00-15:00	2 Stations sharing the same frequency; Arabic: إذاعة نهر النيل; إذاعة الكبار
14	1161	Middle Delta	4:00-22:00	Only receivable at nighttime; Arabic: إذاعة وسط الدلتا
15	1341	Specialty Songs; Koran Radio	5:00-17:00; 17:00-5:00	Specialty Songs is simulcast in part on the FM band while Koran Radio is simulcast on both the MW and the FM bands

=== North coast ===
Foreign radio stations can be received in summer, mainly: Cypriot, Greek, Italian, and Israeli radio stations, but reception is unreliable and fades quickly.

==== Alexandria ====
As of 2007, there were 6 radio stations.

1. 88 MHz Musical Program (stereo)
2. 88.2 MHz Radio Hits (stereo) (since 2010)
3. 88.7 FM Radio Orient (إذاعة الشرق) (A very conservative radio station and the only fully foreign broadcast on the local FM)
4. 90.1 MHz Koran Station (mono)
5. 92.7 MHz Mega FM (stereo; RDS) (since 2010)
6. 94.3 MHz European Program (stereo)
7. 95.5 MHz Shaabi FM (stereo)
8. 97.6 MHz Specialty Songs (stereo)
9. 101.1 MHz Radio Alexandria (mono)
10. 104.7 MHz General Program (mono)
11. 105.2 MHz EL MEHWAR FM (stereo) (since 2025)
12. 100.5 MHz AL-HADATH AL-YOUM FM (stereo) (since 2025)

There used to be local radio stations which were aired in the languages, Armenian, Italian, French, Greek and English in the 1940s.

==== Marina area ====
Since 2009, the government sometimes occasionally broadcasts some radio stations which are only broadcast to Greater Cairo, on the same frequencies used in Greater Cairo. On occasions such as the official vacations in Egypt. The broadcasts can be received by nearby local touristic villages to Marina and very weakly in Alexandria, likewise the radio stations broadcast to Alexandria are received very weakly in and around Marina.

- 88.7 MHz Radio Masr (stereo; RDS) (since 2010)
- 90.9 MHz El Radio FM 90 90 (stereo; RDS) (since February 2012)
- 100.6 MHz Nogoum FM (stereo; RDS)
- 104.2 MHz Nile FM (stereo; RDS)
- 105.3 MHz Nagham FM (stereo) (since 2012)

=== Red Sea ===
==== El Gouna ====
- 88.6 MHz Radio Masr
- 91.7 MHz El Quran El Karim
- 98.2 MHz El Aghany
- 100 MHz El Gouna Radio ("Lagoon Radio") (stereo) (Italian and English) (privately owned by Orascom)
- 101.7 MHz Al Shabab Wel Riada
- 105.3 MHz El Barnamag El Aam

==== Soma Bay ====
- Robinson FM - at Robinson hotel

==== Sharm El Sheikh ====
Most if not all of them are already broadcast in Greater Cairo, except South Sinai.

1. 88 MHz ? (mono) – spoken content.
2. 89.4 MHz General (mono)
3. 91.1 MHz Musical (stereo)
4. 92.5 MHz ? (mono) – spoken content.
5. 94.3 MHz ?
6. 95.7 MHz ? (mono) – spoken content.
7. 97.6 MHz ?
8. 99 MHz South Sinai (mono) – spoken content.

==== Dahab ====
1. 92 MHz Koran (mono)
2. 98.5 MHz ? (mono) – spoken content.
3. 103.7 MHz ? (mono) – spoken content.
4. 107.3 MHz European Program (stereo)

=== Central Egypt ===
1. 89.8 MHz koran station covered Fayoum and Bani Sweif
2. 101.4 MHz northern upper station covered Bani Sweif and Fayoum
3. 94.2 MHz northern upper station covered Minya

== Internet stations ==
After the slow adoption of broadband internet, in the mid-2000s, a number of internet stations streamed on the internet. Most have been streaming on a regular basis as of the widespread adoption of smartphones in the mid-2010s.

=== Examples ===
- TIBA Radio, Private, Adult Contemporary and Classic Hits; based in Hurghada; since 2014
- Radio 5:14 (راديو 5:14) internet Christian podcast, based in Suez; since 2016
- EG on Air (إيچى اون اير), an Egyptian song radio, based in Giza; since 2009 many stations intermittently, regularly one station since 2019

== International stations ==
As of the 1952 coup d'état, no foreign station is allowed to broadcast on Egyptian-controlled land with a 2018 exception in Alexandria (Radio Orient), therefore international broadcasters broadcast from lands close to Egypt, mostly close to the north of Egypt, from Cyprus. Many state controlled radio stations used to broadcast primarily on the medium wave using amplitude modulation broadcasting, but after the adoption of FM broadcasting in Egypt, most of them now are simulcasted on the medium wave and the FM band since the early 2000s. The state controlled radios aren't listed below.

AM radio broadcasting in Egypt had always been mono and other developments were never introduced. Likewise, the long wave band had never been used.

=== Temporary broadcast ===
- As of 2024, Monte Carlo Doualiya has been sharing the frequency 639 kHz with BBC Arabic radio, and Al Arabiya FM which started broadcasting together on the mediumwave in Literary Arabic since November 1, 2023 from Lady's Mile Cyprus, Akrotiri & Dhekelia due to the Gaza war. A similar move has been taken in 2022 by the BBC to restart broadcasting to Ukraine on the shortwave after its invasion.
  As of October 2024, only BBC still broadcasts.

=== Historical ===
International medium wave broadcasting was gradually replaced from 2019 by internet services, e.g online streaming or podcasts, or ceased entirely.

==== Medium wave ====
Former broadcasts from Cape Greco, Cyprus in Literary Arabic:

- 639 kHz BBC Arabic and BBC World Service (British radio service)
- 1233 kHz Monte Carlo International (French radio service) (weak signal)
- 990 kHz (till 2019) Radio Sawa (American radio service) – news, informational content and popular songs. (since March 23, 2002; Relatively weak signal; at first it simulcasted on 981 (Cape Greco) and 1260 (Rhodes) kHz, in 2005 it changed the first frequency to 990 kHz, then it abolished the second one in 2006)

=== Short wave ===
In the 1960s, at time of Nasser rule, short wave broadcasting was important for the state. It used to broadcast stations to the Middle East which were of propagandist importance to the Egyptian regime and for propagating for Arab nationalism.

== See also ==
- Media of Egypt
- List of newspapers in Egypt
- List of magazines in Egypt
- Television in Egypt
- Telecommunications in Egypt
- List of radio stations in Africa
- Radio in other continents
  - Lists of radio stations in Asia
  - Lists of radio stations in Europe
  - Lists of radio stations in North America
  - Lists of radio stations in South America
  - Lists of radio stations in the South Pacific and Oceania
- Rock music and the fall of communism (music as a political tool)
