= Neobyrd =

NEOBYRD
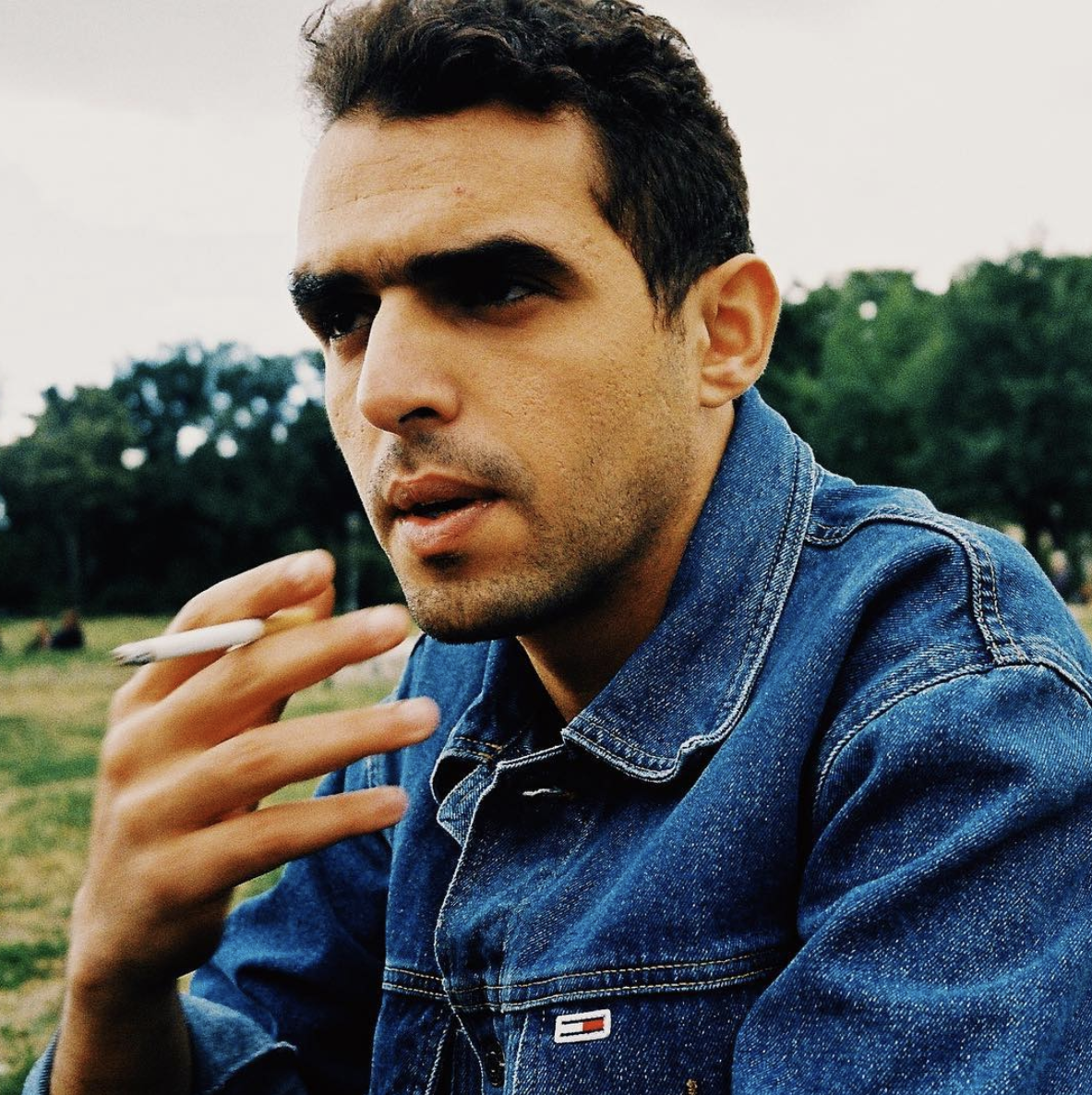

Background information
- Birth name: Wael Alaa
- Born: October 15, 1987 (age 37); Cairo, Egypt
- Origin: Egypt
- Genres: Electronic, electropop, funk, dance
- Years active: 2002–present

Wael Alaa (born October 15, 1987, in Cairo, Egypt) is an Egyptian electronic musician, record producer and film director known by his stage name Neobyrd (stylized in all capitals) whose reputation started with his first album release "Transbyrd" in 2011.

In 2007, he won 3rd place and Special prize in a competition organized by Ableton Live.

His music video for My Sweet Heartless was chosen as one of the top music videos of 2012 by Egyptian publication Ahram Online. His latest album release in early 2013, The King is Dead, achieved record sales in Virgin Megastores in Egypt, and acclaimed reviews by music critics.

He first emerged from the underground electronic scene in Cairo, and garnered mainstream recognition after two tracks from his first album, "With You Again" and "My Sweet Heartless," were played on the Egypt's biggest radio station, Nile FM.
