= Hatem Dowidar =

Egyption businessman and telecom leader

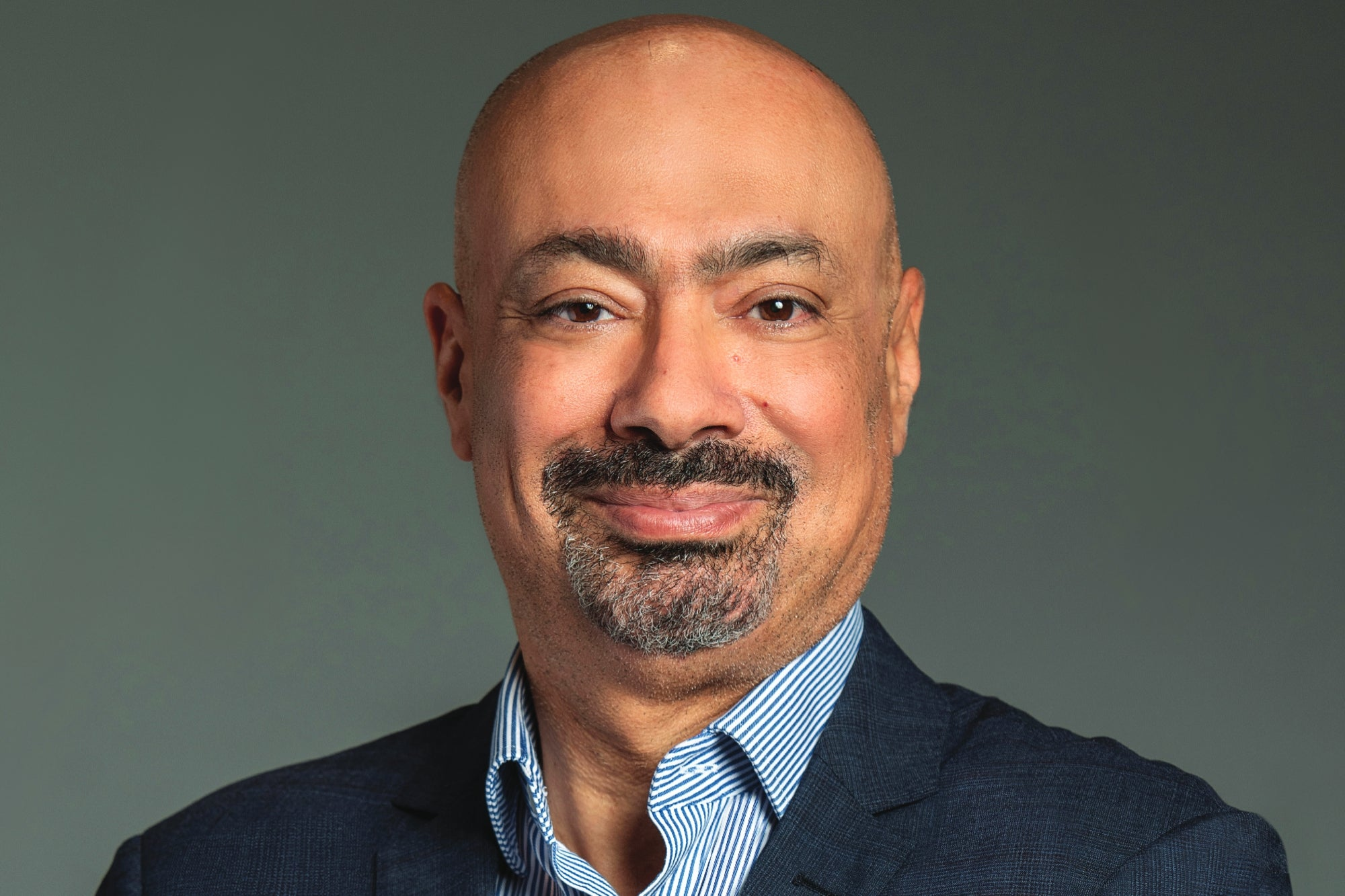
- Dowidar in 2024
- Born: 1969 (age 56–57); Alexandria, Egypt
- Citizenship: Egyptian
- Education: Cairo University (B.Sc.); American University in Cairo (MBA)
- Occupation: Business executive
- Years active: 1991–present
- Known for: Leading e&'s transformation into a global tech conglomerate
- Title: Group CEO of e&
- Website: eand.com

Hatem Dowidar (born 1969) is an Egyptian business executive who serves as the Group CEO of telecommunications company e&, formerly known as Etisalat Group. He is known for driving e&'s transformation into a global digital and investment enterprise with presence in over 38 countries.

== Early life and education ==
Dowidar was born in Cairo, Egypt. He earned a Bachelor's degree in Communications and Electronics Engineering from Cairo University, followed by a postgraduate diploma in Industrial Engineering and an MBA from the American University in Cairo.

He completed executive education programs at institutions such as the University of Chicago Booth School of Business, IMD, London Business School, and Kellogg School of Management.

== Career ==
=== Early career ===
Dowidar began his career at AEG/Deutsche Aerospace in 1991 and later worked at Procter & Gamble in various marketing roles.

=== Vodafone Group ===
He joined Vodafone Egypt in 1999 as Marketing Director and rose to CEO in 2009. He led the company to market leadership and profitability. Dowidar later held international roles, including CEO of Vodafone Malta, CEO of Partner Markets, and Regional Director for Emerging Markets.

=== e& Group ===
Dowidar joined Etisalat in 2015 as Group COO, became CEO International in 2016, and Group CEO in 2020. Under his leadership, the company rebranded to e& in 2022, expanded globally, and diversified into fintech, AI, cybersecurity, and entertainment.

Dowidar led e&’s repositioning from a telecom operator into a global technology brand. By 2024, e& was ranked the Most Valuable Brand Portfolio in the Middle East and Africa.

Hatem Dowidar will step down as group CEO of e& at the end of March 2026, handing over to e& UAE chief Masood M. Sharif Mahmood.

=== Involvement in Charities, NGOs ===
While there is no public record of a personal foundation founded by him, he is a key driver of e&'s ESG (Environmental, Social, and Governance) strategy, which is a core pillar of the company's Vision 2030.

Hatem Dowidar's social initiatives and public commitments is primarily drawn from e&'s official statements and major international governance bodies.

- e& Sustainability/ESG reports detailing commitments like achieving Net-Zero by 2040 and the focus areas of e& ESG strategy (Environment, Digital Inclusion, and DEI). Empowering People and Giving Back to Society' (page 19-21) for details on Digital Access and Inclusion, and the 'Managing Our Environmental Footprint' section (page 14-16) for Net-Zero and climate change commitments.
- Detailing commitment to achieving Net-Zero by 2050 (Scope 1, 2, and 3) and supported by SBTi-validated near-term targets for 2030.
- e& Climate Transition Plan: Provides in-depth details on the Net-Zero by 2050 target and the SBTi-validated near-term targets (43% reduction in Scope 1 & 2 by 2030). Pages 5–6 for target details, and subsequent pages for implementation strategy.

=== e&'s World Economic Forum's EDISON Alliance ===
The goal is to improve 30 million lives by 2025, and Dowidar's appointment as an Alliance Champion.

General background on the EDISON Alliance's 1 Billion Lives Challenge- focus on healthcare, finance, and education e& $6bn pledge: is an official commitment made by e& to the International Telecommunication Union's (ITU) Partner2Connect Digital Coalition (P2C) to advance global digital inclusion.

=== Awards for Social Responsibility/Brand Guardianship ===
Recognition as the number one ranked telecom leader globally on the Brand Guardianship Index 2024 and inclusion in Forbes Middle East's Sustainable Leaders.

== Board memberships ==
Dowidar holds multiple board roles in technology and telecom sectors: His external appointments are part of his public corporate governance record.

Board Memberships
Organization	Role
Vodafone Group	Non-Executive Director
Etihad Etisalat (Mobily)	Board Member
Maroc Telecom	Board Member
Etisalat Egypt	Board Member
Khalifa University	Trustee
GSMA	Board Member
UN Internet Governance Forum	Leadership Panel

Prior Board Memberships
Organization	Role
Hutch Lanka	Board Member
Etisalat Nigeria	Board Member
Attijariwafa Bank Egypt	Board Member
Barclays Bank Egypt and Vodacom Africa	Board Member
Vodafone Egypt and Malta	Board Member
ElSweedy Electrometers	Board Member

== Recognition ==
- Global Merit Leader CEO of the Year 2023 – Telecom Review
- Brand Guardianship Index 2024 – Ranked #1 Telecom Leader Globally
- Top CEOs 2024 – Ranked #9 by Forbes Middle East
- Corporate Leadership Award – Takreem Foundation
- Recognized for his leadership and innovation in the telecom and technology sectors. In 2023, listed among the Forbes Middle East Top 100 CEOs.
- Listed among 100 Most Inspiring Leaders for his strategic direction at e& and transformation of the business into a global technology group.
- Middle East’s Sustainable Leaders by Forbes for driving impactful ESG initiatives at e&.
- Featured by Favikon as a top B2B influencer for 2024.
- Distinguished Alumni of the American University in Cairo, honored in 2013 for his global leadership career.

== Philanthropy ==
Dowidar advocates for digital inclusion and has supported governance forums such as the UN IGF, promoting responsible internet policy and access.

== Personal life ==
Dowidar was born into a family with media and aviation backgrounds. His father, Galal Dowidar, was editor of Al Akhbar newspaper and head of the Egyptian Travel Writers Association. His mother worked as head of publicity for EgyptAir.
