= Orange Egypt =

Telecommunication company in Egypt

Orange Egypt for Telecommunications S.A.E.
- Native name: اورنچ
- Formerly: Mobinil (1998–2016)
- Type: Société Anonyme Égyptienne
- Industry: Telecommunications
- Founded: March 4, 1998; 28 years ago
- Headquarters: Cairo, Egypt
- Area served: Egypt
- Key people: Yasser Shaker (chairman); Hesham Mahran (CEO)
- Revenue: ▼ E£3.3 billion (Q1 2018)
- Operating income: ▲ E£3.3 billion (Q1 2018)
- Total assets: ▲ E£27.4 billion (Q1 2018)
- Total equity: ▲ E£12.6 billion (Q1 2018)
- Number of employees: 152,000 (2017)
- Parent: Orange S.A. (99.96%)
- Website: www.orange.eg/en

Orange (Egyptian Arabic: اورنچ), formerly known as Mobinil (Egyptian Arabic: موبينيل), is an Egyptian mobile network operator (the oldest in Egypt), founded on March 4, 1998. Orange provides voice and data exchange services, as well as 5G, 4G, 3G, ADSL and broadband internet.

== Network and coverage ==
Orange Egypt has:

- 99,299 sites;
- 36 switches;
- 4503 mobile BTSs.

Orange was the first mobile carrier in Egypt to extend its network service to underground stations, having installed 17 Micro BTSs covering stations in Cairo in addition to the Al Azhar Tunnel.

Orange has international roaming agreements with 348 operators in 135 countries, being the first in Egypt to establish roaming agreements with the US and Canada, as well as non-GSM operators in South American countries including Argentina, Brazil and Peru.

Orange Egypt offers roaming with satellite operators such as Al-Thuraya.

Orange claims that its coverage extends to more than 99% of the Egyptian population.

Orange is continually ranked as the fastest network in Egypt by Speedtest and the National Telecom Regulatory Authority. According to the latter, Orange Egypt provides an average speed of 32 Mbit/s.

== Market share ==
As of October–December, 2017, Orange has about 33.5 million active subscribers from almost 101.27 million mobile subscribers in Egypt.

== Recent changes ==
On March 8, 2016, Mobinil was officially rebranded to Orange.

On October 14, 2016, Orange acquired the fourth-generation (4G) internet services licence after signing a $484-million agreement with the national telecom regulator.

By late 2016, Orange started offering 4G internet services.

On May 1, 2018, Yasser Shaker was appointment as the CEO of Orange Egypt.

On June 26, 2018, Orange announced that they would be providing new 4G+ internet services to their users.

On March 27, 2019, Home VDSL launches at speeds of up to 100 Mb, and launch something innovative by subscribing through Jumia.

== Disputes ==
In November 2017, Orange Egypt have reached a final and mutual agreement with Telecom Egypt over disputes related to interconnection, infrastructure and international gateway services.

== See also ==
- Telecom Egypt
- Vodafone Egypt
- e& Egypt
