= Vodafone Egypt =

Egyptian telecommunications company

Vodafone Egypt Telecommunications S.A.E.
- Native name: ڤودافون
- Formerly: Click GSM
- Type: Société Anonyme Égyptienne
- Industry: Telecommunications
- Founded: May 1998; 28 years ago
- Headquarters: Cairo, Egypt
- Area served: Egypt
- Key people: Mohamed Abdallah (CEO); Hany Mahmoud (Chairman)
- Number of employees: 10,000 (2023)
- Parent: Vodacom Group Limited (55%) Telecom Egypt (45%)
- Website: web.vodafone.com.eg

Vodafone (Egyptian Arabic: ڤودافون) is the largest mobile network operator in Egypt in terms of active subscribers. It was launched in 1998 under its former name, Click GSM (Egyptian: كليك چى اس ام). It covers various voice and data exchange services, as well as 5G, 4G, 3G, ADSL, and broadband Internet services.

Vodafone Egypt was initially headquartered in Maadi, Cairo since 1998 and until 2003; when Vodafone moved its headquarters to the Sixth of October City. Some of the key members of the core network launch team were Neil Marley, Ian Crawford, and Peter Karney. Currently, all of Vodafone's core operations are run from Vodafone's campus at the Smart Village Technology Park.

== License and establishment ==
Logo of Click GSM (1998–2001)

On 30 November 1998, Vodafone Egypt Telecommunications announced that MisrFone Group (of which Vodafone owned a 30% share) was awarded the second license for GSM operations in Egypt (under the brand name of Click GSM). This decision was part of the move to privatize and liberalize the Egyptian market at the time. The first license had been given to the national incumbent which had launched the first mobile service in 1996 (the company is now Orange Egypt). In 2007, the telecommunications market in Egypt grew further and became more competitive when the third entrant to the market, Etisalat Misr, was awarded the third license for GSM operations.

Click-Vodafone Logo (2001)

In January 2007, Egypt's National Telecom Regulatory Agency (NTRA) awarded Vodafone Egypt a 15-year 3G licence.

On 16 October 2016, Vodafone Egypt was awarded the fourth-generation 4G mobile services license for a royalty fee of $335 million from the Egyptian National Telecom Regulatory Authority (NTRA).

In January 2020, Saudi Telecom announced a preliminary agreement to buy Vodafone Group's 55% shareholding in Vodafone Egypt for $2.4 billion, which eventually failed to occur. However, in 2022, Vodafone sold its Egypt shares to Vodacom Group Limited in South Africa, itself a majority-owned Vodafone company that controls Vodafone's other African operations.

On 7 October 2024, the Ministry of Communications and Information Technology awarded 5G licenses to Vodafone Egypt, along with Orange Egypt and e& Egypt. Vodafone's commercial 5G service was later launched in June 2025 along with the other carriers.

Vodafone's Campus at Smart Village

Vodafone's Building "Sixth Horizon" at Sixth of October City

== Market position ==
Vodafone became the market leader in terms of revenue share and customer base in 2011. Vodafone Egypt offers telecommunication services ranging from voice to data and Internet to both consumers and businesses in Egypt. As part of that approach, Vodafone Egypt purchased 51% of Raya Telecom in September 2006, which provided a range of resources to assist Vodafone expand. It had a geographically distributed network throughout Egypt and extensive expertise in fixed-line data transfer. Raya Telecom's resources were a good match for Vodafone's expansion plan, therefore the remaining share of Raya Telecom was bought, and Vodafone Egypt obtained full control in June 2007.

== Subsidiaries ==
Vodafone International Services (_VOIS)

_VOIS (formerly known as VIS) is a Vodafone Egypt subsidiary dedicated to delivering Business process outsourcing (BPO) and information technology outsourcing (ITO) services for sister Vodafone operators and beyond. Vodafone International Services started to provide services to Vodafone UK with 4 IT professionals in 2002.

Sarmady

In 2008, Vodafone Egypt acquired Sarmady (formerly Sarcom). Established in 2001, Sarmady led some of Egypt's popular internet content and services including FilGoal.com, FilFan.com, Akhbarak.net, ContactCars.com, DarAlAkhbar.com and Reyada.com, fixed and mobile including sports, film, music, city guides, classifieds and social network. It became the digital arm, delivering Vodafone's Internet experience in Egypt.

== Vodafone Egypt Foundation ==
Vodafone Egypt Foundation makes long term social investments and was registered in 2003 as a Corporate Donor in the Egyptian Ministry of Social Solidarity. The Foundation is registered as a separate legal entity from Vodafone Egypt, governed by an independent Board of Trustees that includes a number of prominent figures in the area of development and social work in Egypt.

Vodafone Egypt Foundation is among 23 Vodafone Foundations around the world and is part of Vodafone's commitment to be a responsible global citizen and member of society. The Foundation is driven by Vodafone's strategic goal of being a leading responsible business by engaging in various forms of social investment aiming at improving the livelihood for marginalized people in Egypt. Vodafone Egypt Foundation implements all its projects through NGOs by granting funds to implement projects in addition to in-kind and volunteering support by Vodafone Egypt employees.

In February 2011, Vodafone Egypt Foundation launched the literacy initiative, a nationwide program (in cooperation with the UNESCO, and the Life Makers Association, as well as several civil society organization and relevant entities and in coordination with the Egyptian Ministry of Education) to tackle a major problem in Egyptian Society, illiteracy. The initiative aims to eradicate the illiteracy of 17 million Egyptians by 2017.

== Market share ==
As of 2025, Vodafone has about 51.5 million active subscriptions in Egypt.

== Criticism during the 2011 Egyptian Revolution ==
During the 2011 Egyptian Revolution, Vodafone was heavily criticized by the Egyptian republic for switching off services (the other operating networks as of then, Mobinil and Etisalat did the same) when protests against former president Hosni Mubarak began. But the Egyptian authorities then ordered to switch the network back on, in order to send unsolicited text messages under Egypt's, then enacted, emergency laws.

In response to the criticisms regarding those text messages, Vodafone announced that the Egyptian government forced all telecom operators to send pro-Hosni Mubarak text messages to its customers in that country. The company says it protested to the authorities that the current situation regarding these messages is unacceptable.

Vodafone also faced a backlash in Egypt over an advert suggesting it helped inspire this year's revolution in the country. The three-minute commercial featured excerpts from a previous Vodafone ad campaign entitled "Our Power". The video goes on to show images from protest rallies in Cairo's Tahrir Square before claiming: "We didn't send people to the streets, we didn't start the revolution … We only reminded Egyptians how powerful they are." Vodafone has strongly disassociated itself from the commercial, which was produced by the international marketing firm JWT. "The company does not have any connection to this video and had no prior knowledge of its production or posting on the internet," said Hatem Dowidar.

== Ramadan brand advertisements ==
Vodafone Egypt used to enter the Ramadan media race with dedicated video adverts every year in Egypt as the viewership in the country spikes to the maximum. The company used to bring Egyptian celebrities to star in their Ramadan brand ads, such as Amr Diab, Esaad Younis, Mena Shalaby, Ghada Adel, Mahmoud El-Essily, Yousra, Ahmed El-Sakka, Samir Ghanem, Dalal Abdel Aziz, and many more in the last 10 years.

== See also ==
- Telecom Egypt
- Orange Egypt
- e& Egypt
