= Radio Masr =

Egyptian radio station

- Type: Radio network
- Country: Egypt

Ownership
- Owner: National Media Authority

History
- Launch date: 2009; 17 years ago

Coverage
- Availability: International

Radio Masr is the first governmental radio station in Egypt to be transmitted on FM. It has launched on April 24, 2009.

== See also ==
- ERTU
- List of radio stations in Egypt
