= Etisalat Egypt =

Telecommunication company in Egypt

etisalat Egypt
- Type: S.A.
- Industry: Telecommunications
- Founded: 30 April 2007; 19 years ago
- Headquarters: Cairo, Egypt
- Key people: Hazem Metwally CEO Gamal Sadat Head of the Board of Directors
- Products: Mobile phone services
- Parent: etisalat
- Website: eand.com.eg

etisalat Egypt, and known as simply etisalat (formerly e& Egypt), is the third mobile operator to enter the Egyptian market and the first integrated operator for telecom services in Egypt. It officially started its business in 2007 and attracted one million subscribers in the first fifty days of the launch of its operations. etisalat was the first company to provide 3.5G and 4G services while not needing its customers to change their SIM cards, in addition to consistently developing its network.

etisalat Egypt is one of the companies operating under the Emirates Telecommunication Group Company, which was established in 1976 and later expanded to operate in 16 countries across the Middle East, Africa, and Asia, serving more than 148 million subscribers with its services.

etisalat provides mobile, fixed-line, mobile Internet, and fixed Internet services.

== Investments ==
etisalat spent more than 50 billion pounds over a period of 12 years to develop its network and infrastructure. The company's capital also increased by approximately £4.5 billion, raised from the company's main shareholders, to make the total capital £19.5 billion. These ongoing investments have enabled etisalat to become the prime company in the Egyptian telecommunications market.

The ownership structure of etisalat Egypt is divided into seven entities: Etisalat International Egypt Co. Ltd., Emirates (66% of capital), Post for Investments S.A.E., Egypt (20%), DAS Holding (5%), DIFC LLC, UAE (5%), Saudi Tech Invest Com (1.5%), Al Naboodah Investments (1.5%), and Mawarid Finance (1%).

== Sponsorships ==
=== Al-Ahly Sporting Club ===
On 4 October 2011, etisalat signed a contract to sponsor Al-Ahly Club's shirt for three years. The signing was held in the presence of the company's chairman, Eng. Gamal El-Sadat, its CEO Saleh Al-Abdooli, and a number of company leaders, in addition to Al-Ahly Club President Hassan Hamdy and Al-Ahly Club's Vice President Captain Mahmoud Al-Khatib, and the club's technical director, Manuel Jose. etisalat sponsored Al-Ahly Club shirt for three years for £135 million, after a rife competition with Vodafone. The bid against Vodafone had reached £130 million, and etisalat was able to seal the deal after raising the bid by £5 million.

On 19 October 2022, etisalat announced their sponsorship for the second time for Al Ahly on a 4-year deal worth E£800 million, replacing WE as the club's main sponsor.

== Partnerships ==
In May 2023, etisalat Egypt announced a retail voice partnership with IDT Global, a division of IDT Corporation. Under the agreement, the two companies launched an unlimited calling service that allows customers in the United States and Canada to place unlimited calls to up to ten Etisalat Egypt mobile numbers for a 30-day period.

== See also ==
- Telecom Egypt
- Vodafone Egypt
- Orange Egypt
