= Nogoum FM =

Egyptian radio station

- Cairo; Egypt
- Frequency: 100.6 MHz

History
- First air date: 10 May 2003

Links
- Website: www.nogoumfm.net

Nogoum FM is the first private radio station in Egypt, started on 10 May 2003, based in the Egyptian Media Production City. It is owned by Taher Helmy and the Good News Company, which in turn is owned by Emad El Din Adeeband and his family members.

Nogoum FM broadcasts on frequency FM 100.6 in Cairo and airs a variety of daily social, artistic, cultural, political, sports, women, and children's programs. It won best radio station in the sixth Arab Satellite Festival in 2015; it also started Nogoum FM TV channel in May 2015.

== See also ==
- Mass media in Egypt
