= Nile FM =

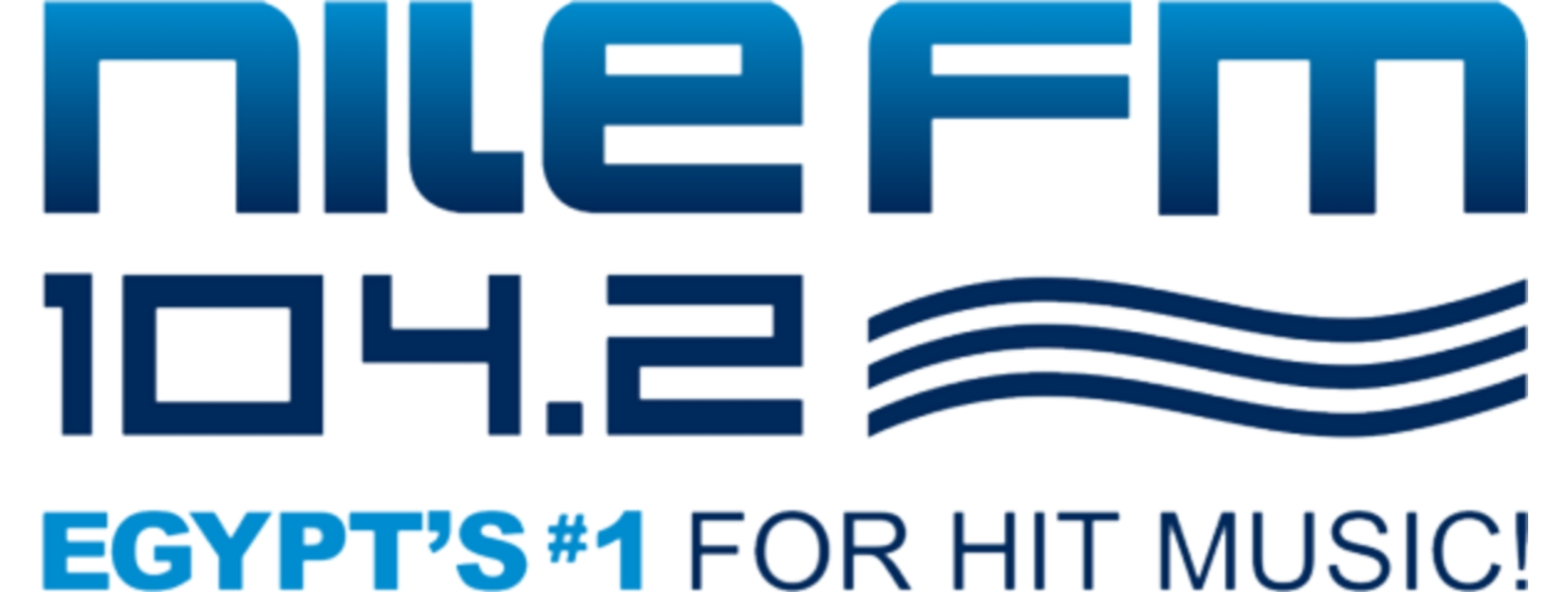
- Cairo; Egypt
- Frequency: 104.2 MHz

Programming
- Language: English
- Format: English hits

Ownership
- Owner: Nile Radio Productions

History
- First air date: 2003

Links
- Webcast: https://www.nilefm.com/listen-live
- Website: https://www.nilefm.com/

Nile FM is a privately owned English-language radio station based in Cairo, Egypt, that plays English-language music hits and with each show, based on a TV format hits listeners with "topics" and non rewarded quizzes or competitions, its owned by Nile Radio Productions. Nile FM airs at 104.2 FM. During its popularity peak with listeners the station's shows were "Morning Show with Mark and Sally" replaced when Sally quit with the Big Breakfast. The listener peak was a combination of hosts were Rob Stevens and Nadine Hesham. But 6 years after Sally Left the station for Canada and her career as an actress, she returned to Egypt and Nile FM causing Rob quit shortly afterwards. During its hayday the bests shows were The Big Breakfast hosted by Rob Stevens and Nadine, American Top 40 hosted by Ryan Seacrest, Future Sound of Egypt with Aly and Fila (defunked), A State of Trance with Armin van Buuren - No longer aired on this station. . . .

== See also ==
- List of radio stations in Egypt
