= Economy of Egypt =

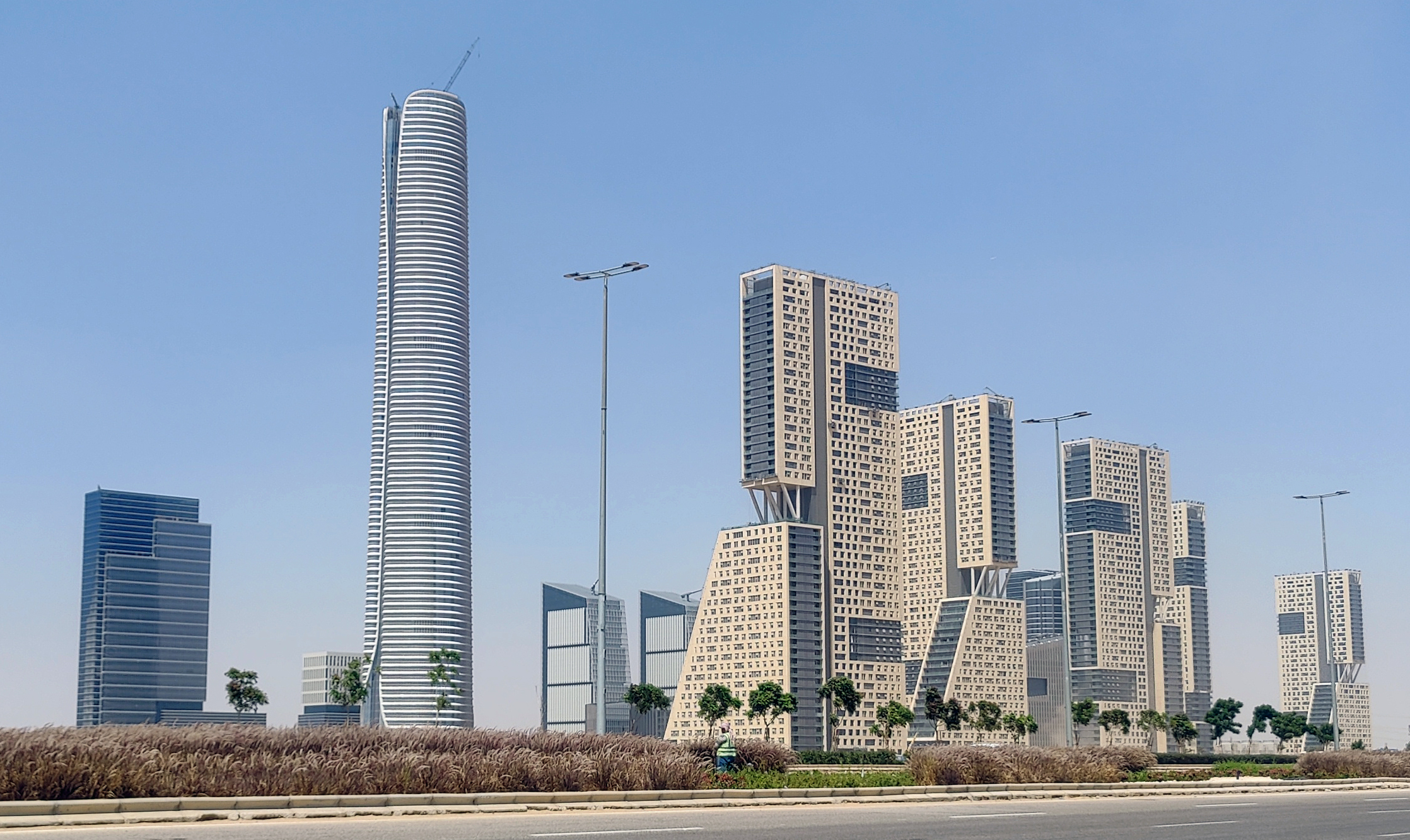
- The business district in Egypt’s planned new capital.
- Currency: Egyptian pound (EGP, LE)
- Fiscal year: 1 July – 30 June
- Trade organisations: AfCFTA, African Union, COMESA, CAEU, WTO, BRICS
- Country group: Developing/emerging; Lower-middle income economy

Statistics
- Population: ▲110,060,000 (2026)
- GDP: ▲$442.89 billion (nominal, 2026); ▲$2.6 trillion (PPP, 2026)
- GDP rank: 41st (nominal; 2026); 18th (PPP; 2026)
- GDP growth: ▲5.1% (2026)
- GDP per capita: ▲$4,020 (nominal, 2026); ▲$23,620 (PPP, 2026)
- GDP per capita rank: 133rd (nominal; 2026); 89th (PPP; 2026)
- GDP per capita growth: ▲2.8% (2025)
- GDP by sector: Agriculture: 10.6%; Industry: 32.7%; Services: 51.6%; (2023 est.)
- GDP by component: Household consumption: 82.6%; Government consumption: 6.8%; Investment in fixed capital: 15.2%; Investment in inventories: -2.3%; Exports of goods and services: 19.2%; Imports of goods and services: -21.3%; (2023 est.)
- Inflation (CPI): 14.3% (2026)
- Population below national poverty line: ▼ Multidimensional poverty: 2% (2021); ▼ At $4.20/day: 7% (2021); ▼ At $8.30/day: 59% (2021); ▼ National poverty line: 29.7% (2019)
- Gini coefficient: 28.5 low (2021)
- Human Development Index: ▲0.754 high (2025) (100th); ▲0.582 medium IHDI (2025) (98th)
- Corruption Perceptions Index: ▲30 out of 100 points (2025, 130th rank)
- Labour force: ▲35.64 million (Q2 2026); ▲45.5% participation rate (2024)
- Labour force by occupation: Agriculture: 18.66%; Industry: 26.36%; Services: 52.98%; (2022 est.)
- Unemployment: ▼5.8% (Q2 2026); ▼18.8% youth unemployment (2024; 15 to 24 year-olds); ▼2.08 million unemployed (Q2 2026)
- Informal employment: 67% (2024)
- Main industries: textiles, food processing, tourism, chemicals, pharmaceuticals, hydrocarbons, construction, cement, metals, light manufactures

External
- Exports: ▲$54.6 billion (2024)
- Export goods: Refined petroleum, gold, nitrogenous fertilizer, insulated wire and citrus.
- Main export partners: EU 25.35%; Italy 4.74%; Spain 3.13%; Germany 3.00%; GCC 21.72%; Saudi Arabia 14.32%; UAE 5.97%; Turkey 8.48%; United States 5.20%; Libya 3.57%; United Kingdom 3.44%; Morocco 2.49% (2024)
- Imports: ▲$98.4 billion (2024)
- Import goods: Refined petroleum, petroleum gas, wheat, cars and packaged medicaments.
- Main import partners: EU 22.47%; Germany 4.15%; Italy 3.19%; France 2.40%; China 16.57%; GCC 13.33%; Saudi Arabia 8.33%; UAE 2.73%; United States 7.64%; Russia 6.11%; Brazil 4.15%; Turkey 4.13% (2024)
- FDI stock: ▼$15.453 billion (2025)
- Current account: -4.4% of GDP (2026)
- Gross external debt: ▲$166.748 billion (Jun 2026)

Public finance
- Government debt: ▼84% of GDP (2026)
- Foreign reserves: ▲$52.745 billion (Feb 2026)
- Budget balance: ▼−11.4% of GDP (2026)
- Revenue: 16.51% of GDP (2026)
- Spending: 27.92% of GDP (2026)
- Credit rating: Standard & Poor's: B; Outlook: Stable; Moody's: B3; Outlook: Stable; Fitch: B+; Outlook: Stable
- All values, unless otherwise stated, are in US dollars.

Egypt has a developing mixed economy, combining private business with government regulation. It is the 2nd largest economy in Africa, and 41st in worldwide ranking as of 2026. It is a major emerging market economy and a member of the African Union, BRICS, and a signatory to the African Continental Free Trade Area (AfCFTA). Since the 2000s, structural reforms including fiscal and monetary policies, tax adjustments, privatization, and new business legislation have helped Egypt move towards a more market-oriented economy and increased foreign investment. The reforms lifted annual macroeconomic growth and helped bring down the country's high unemployment and poverty rates.

Egypt is recovering from its 2023–2024 financial crisis. It has benefited from reforms under its development strategy Egypt Vision 2030, as well as a dramatic currency floatation in 2024 that resulted in a 38% depreciation of the Egyptian pound against the dollar after securing more than $50 billion in international financing. These steps, alongside agreements with global partners such as the IMF, World Bank, European Union, and Gulf States, have helped improve the credit outlook and stabilize the economy. It also benefits from political stability, proximity to Europe, and rising exports.

Egypt is the world's 4th largest recipient of remittances, an important source of foreign currency for the Egyptian economy. In 2025, the country received $41.5 billion from Egyptians working abroad, ranking just behind the Philippines. The country is also the world's 25th largest and Africa's top investment destination, attracting $15.453 billion in FDI during 2025. It has the largest manufacturing sector in Africa, accounting for approximately 22% of the continent's total manufacturing value. The Suez Canal, located in Egypt, is a major maritime corridor for global supply chains and one of the world's most important trade chokepoints. Around 12% of global trade passes through the canal, accounting for roughly 30% of worldwide container traffic and more than $1 trillion in goods annually. In 2020, about 19,000 vessels transited the route.

== History ==
=== Ancient Egypt ===
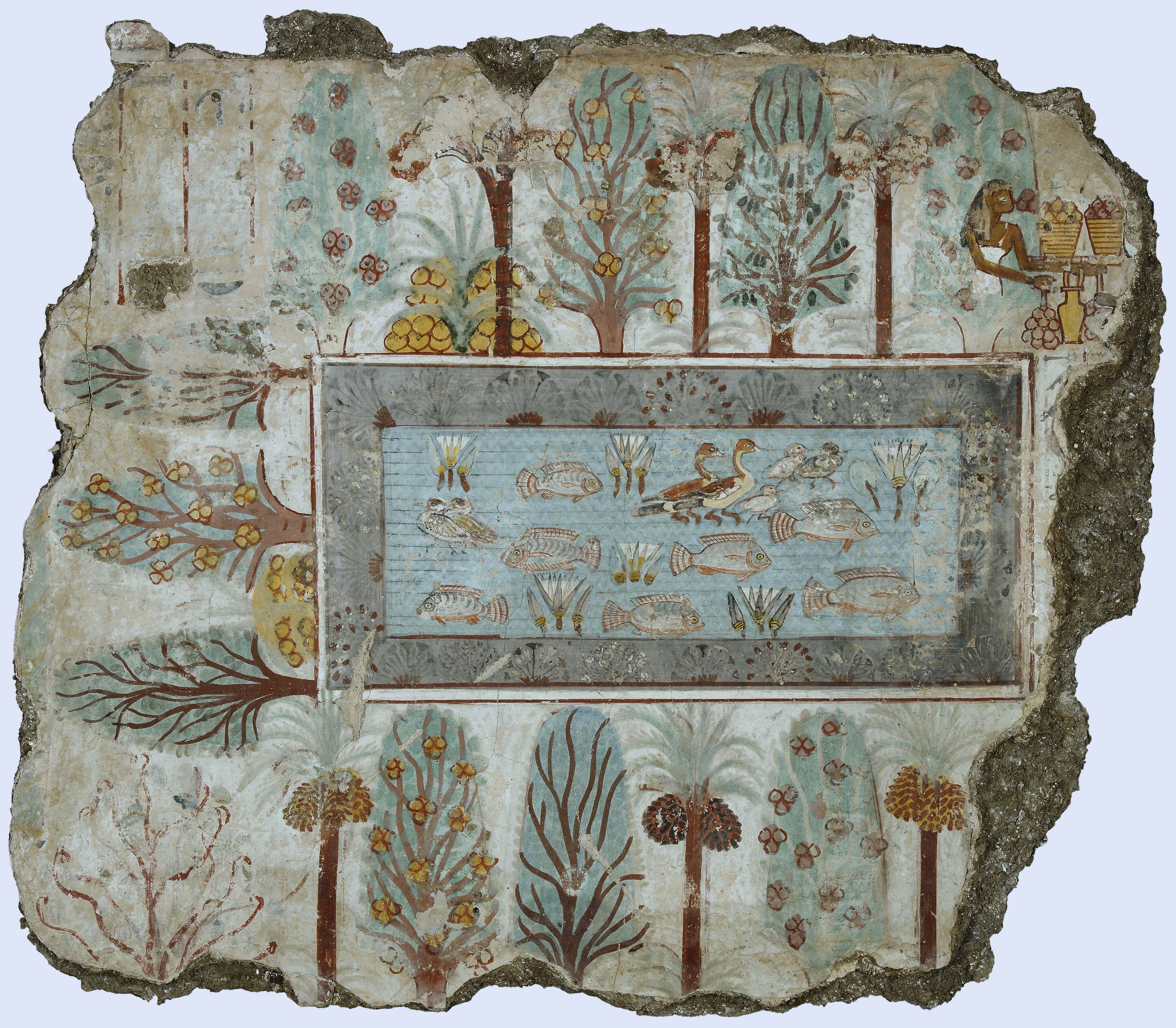
Rectangular fishpond with ducks and lotus planted round with date palms and fruit trees, Tomb of Nebamun, Thebes, 18th Dynasty

The economy in ancient Egypt was based on a centralized state structure, with the pharaoh exercising theoretical control over all land and resources. Wealth was managed and redistributed through a network of temples and granaries overseen by appointed officials, particularly the vizier, who supervised land surveys, tax collection, and resource allocation. While coinage was not used until the Late Period, Egyptians relied on a barter-based economy, where standardized values, such as sacks of grain and copper deben, were used for wages and trade. Laborers received monthly grain rations, and a fixed price system regulated commerce throughout the kingdom.

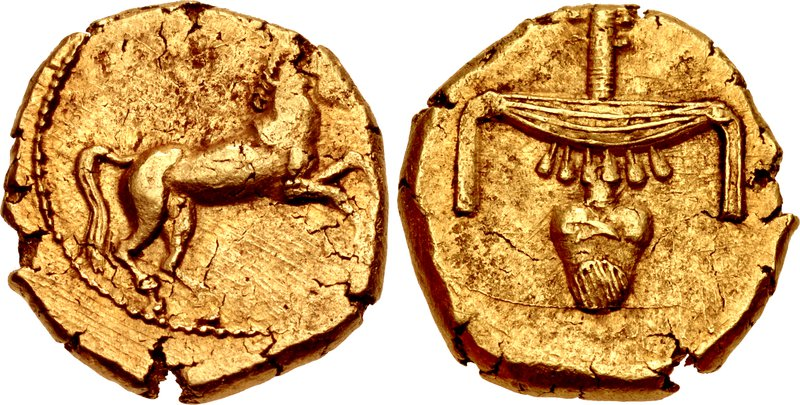
Gold stater of Nectanebo II: reverse with hieroglyphs nfr-nb. It is the first coin minted in Egypt, c. 360 BC.

Agriculture was the foundation of the economy, sustained by the annual flooding of the Nile, which deposited nutrient-rich silt on the fields. The state taxed agricultural production according to the land owned, and farmers were obligated to provide both goods and labor through a corvée system. Emmer and barley were the primary staples, used to make bread and beer, while flax provided linen for clothing. Papyrus was harvested for writing material, and vegetables such as leeks, garlic, melons, and pulses were cultivated alongside fruits like grapes and dates. Additional goods included textiles, beer, wine, honey, and leather, many of which were produced in temple workshops. Livestock, such as cattle, poultry, donkeys, and bees, carried both economic and ritual weight, while natural resources like copper, gold, alabaster, and granite were extracted through state-controlled expeditions.

=== Greco-Roman period ===
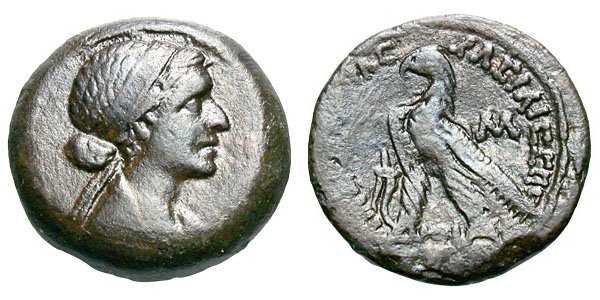
A silver coin of 40 drachmai (1 obol) minted in Alexandria between 51 and 30 BC, with Cleopatra VII depicted on the obverse, and an eagle on a thunderbolt with the inscription "ΒΑΣΙΛΙΣΣΗΣ ΚΛΕΟΠΑΤΡΑΣ" (Basilissēs Kleopatras) on the reverse.

Ptolemaic Egypt blended traditional agrarian systems with new fiscal and administrative reforms. The economy produced wheat, flax, wine, and textiles, with state control over beer, oil, and salt. Agriculture, organized around the Nile's flood cycle, remained central. The early Ptolemies implemented extensive land reclamation where immigrant Greeks and military settlers were granted privileged access to land, while native Egyptians were pushed into subordinate roles with limited protections. Greeks also dominated Hellenic urban centers and viticulture, while the administrative spread of the Greek language displaced Demotic, restricting Egyptian access to legal and bureaucratic institutions.

The state developed a complex and unequal tax system on land, produce, labor, and individuals, collected via granaries and banks. Taxation favored Greeks through exemptions and privileges, while Egyptians faced heavier burdens. Temples retained economic significance but lost autonomy under centralized administration. Early Ptolemaic Egypt was relatively prosperous, helped by land reclamation, urban growth, and expanding fiscal and agricultural systems. But its growth was held back by deep social inequality, which fed later unrest and rural uprisings, along with dynastic disputes and flight from the land.

During the Greco-Roman and Byzantine periods, Egypt, particularly Upper Egypt, became renowned for its textile production. Workshops across the country produced what came to be known as Coptic textiles, known for their designs, colors, and techniques such as tapestry weaving. These textiles preserved elements of Pharaonic craftsmanship while integrating Greco-Roman stylistic influences. In the Byzantine period, linen and woolen textiles featuring geometric, vegetal, and figural motifs flourished. This became the artistic and technical foundation for Egypt's later Islamic textile industry, which adopted and adapted many of these decorative traditions.

=== Middle Ages ===
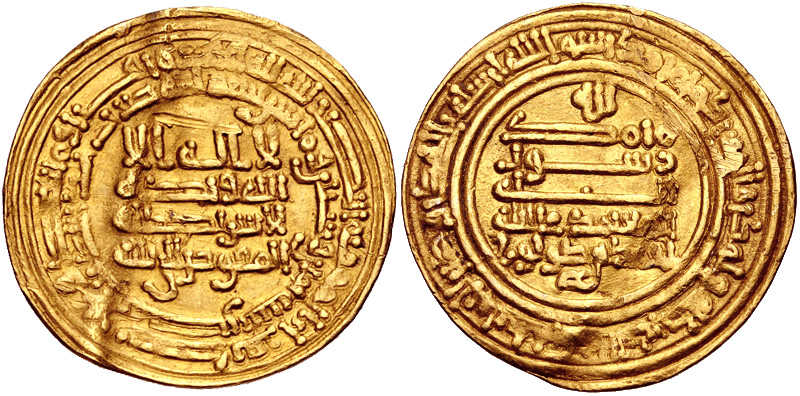
Egyptian gold dinar of Ahmad ibn Tulun, minted in Egypt, 881-882 AD

Beginning in the early Islamic period, Egypt's countryside was incorporated into a broader administrative and fiscal structure that facilitated the movement of goods and surplus to urban centers. By the 11th and 12th centuries, this integration had developed into a dynamic economic relationship between rural producers and commercial networks. Villages produced grain, flax, indigo, sugar, and linen textiles, much of which was sent to Fustat, the primary urban hub for redistribution. Documents from the Cairo Geniza reveal that rural merchants and producers were involved in long-distance trade linking Egypt to the Mediterranean and the Indian Ocean.

Textiles were one of the mainstays of the medieval Egyptian economy, tying together agriculture, manufacturing, and commerce. Flax was widely grown, and turning it into linen was a major industry. Production ran through both private workshops and government-linked operations. Besides being a leading export, cloth also served at home as a means of exchange and a store of value. Egypt's prosperity rested not only on international trade but on the scale and organization of its own textile production.

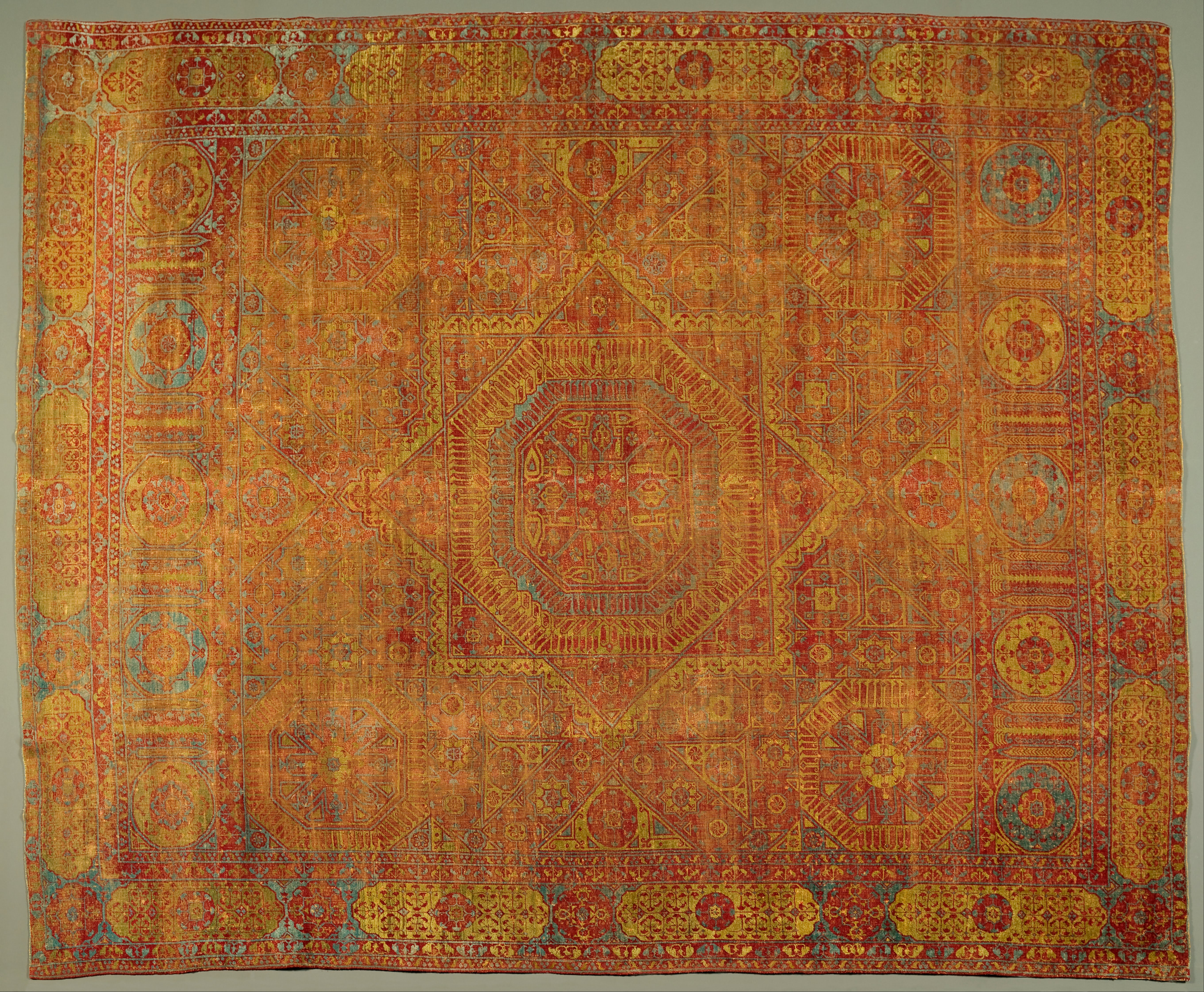
A Mamluk-era wool carpet from Egypt, c. 1500–1550.

Saving and investment in this period were highly organized. Wealth was accumulated through land, textiles, and monetary holdings, and often reinvested into productive activities such as textile manufacture, agriculture, and trade. These practices were a routine part of everyday economic life.

In the fifteenth century, Egypt experienced a series of economic and financial crises under the Mamluk regime, marked by inflation, currency instability, and fiscal disorder. Contemporary scholars such as al-Maqrizi and al-Asadi offered detailed assessments of the causes and proposed reforms. Al-Maqrizi identified the debasement of the currency and the overreliance on copper coinage as central problems, advocating a return to the use of gold and silver standards. Al-Asadi presented a broader analysis, attributing the crisis to both monetary mismanagement and deeper structural inequalities, including the concentration of wealth and administrative corruption.

=== Early modern period ===
Egypt's earliest industrial efforts began under Muhammad Ali (r. 1805–1849), whose state-led program focused on military goods, agricultural processing, and textiles. By the 1830s, 30 cotton mills employed around 30,000 workers, but the experiment collapsed due to poor management, fuel shortages, and reliance on forced corvée labor. Though short-lived, this phase weakened traditional artisan guilds and introduced wage labor. A later wave under Isma'il Pasha (r. 1863–1879), sparked by the American Civil War cotton boom, saw attempts at diversification with sugar refineries and textile plants. These too struggled against European competition, but they helped expand Egypt's wage labor force and laid foundations for a modern working class.

Between 1869 and 1876, Ismail launched British-led military campaigns against Sudanese slave raiders, as part of broader efforts to reassert Egyptian authority in Sudan. The process culminated in the signing of the Anglo-Egyptian Slave Trade Convention in 1877, which formally ended the practice of slavery and slave trade in Egypt. Ismail's increasing political subordination to Britain, particularly after Egypt's default on its international debt in 1876, likely facilitated the agreement.

By the late 19th century, a clearer working class began to emerge. This was shaped by Egypt's integration into the global capitalist economy under foreign control, especially following the British occupation in 1882. European capital, attracted to Egypt's export sector, invested heavily in transport and utilities, prompting the development of urban infrastructure but neglecting broader industrialization. Employment in these sectors, especially railways, ports, and public utilities, formed the nucleus of the new working class.

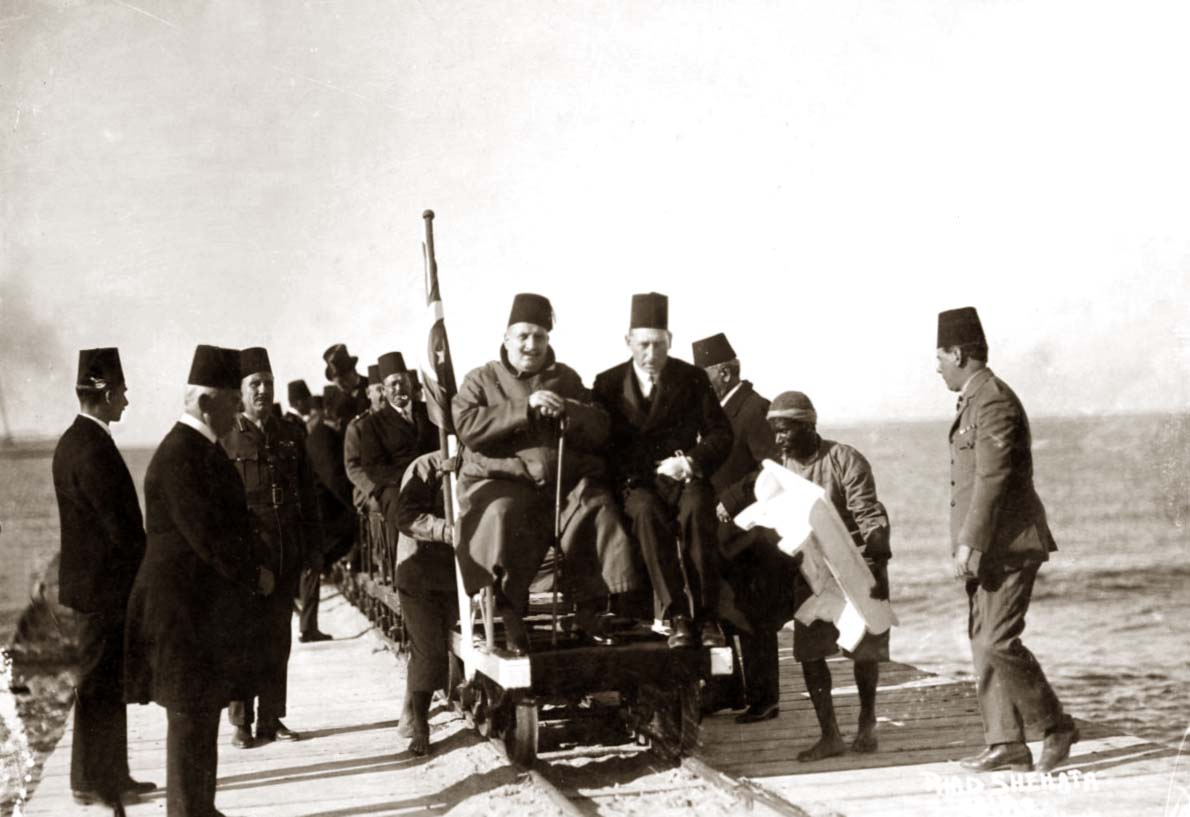
King Fuad I with his ministers on a visit to the phosphate mines in the Red Sea region.

Legal reforms under Muhammad Ali and his successors enabled land privatization, displacing a third of the peasantry by the late 19th century. Many had migrated to cities, joining an expanding pool of wage laborers. Meanwhile, the rise of foreign capital eroded Egypt's artisan guilds, particularly after the 1890 Professional Permits Duty. Guilds fractured, with guild heads becoming labor contractors and members reduced to common laborers, leading to tensions culminating in early labor unrest such as the 1882 Port Said coal loaders' strike.

By the early 20th century, guild-based trades had collapsed, leading to a notable increase in wage labor. Foreign skilled workers, mainly Greeks, Armenians, and Italians, introduced European labor ideologies and led early strikes in sectors like cigarettes, tailoring, and printing. Wage gaps and employer manipulation often blocked unity with Egyptian workers. Strikes on the trams and railways pushed workers into unions and sharpened class awareness, especially during the 1908 and 1911 Cairo tram strikes, which drew harsh repression and led to martial law in 1914.

Despite several waves of industrial experimentation, early attempts at industrialization struggled due to factors like tariff restrictions imposed by Britain through the 1838 commercial treaty. In the beginning of the 20th century, little industrial development occurred, and Egypt's land-owning elite invested mainly in land rather than industry. Foreign competition stunted domestic ventures, with only a few enterprises, such as sugar and cotton processing, surviving under foreign ownership. In the following years, over one million Egyptians would be conscripted to the Egyptian Labour Corps and Egyptian Camel Transport Corps to support British efforts in World War I, often through coercion. Simultaneously, wartime shortages spurred growth in domestic industries such as textiles and food processing, prompting the establishment of the Commission of Commerce and Industry in 1916.

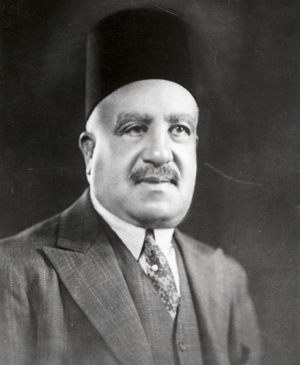
Talaat Harb, widely regarded as the father of the modern Egyptian economy

By the 1920s, Egypt's urban labor force had grown sharply, supported by a limited but increasing domestic industrialization under a wave of economic nationalism pioneered in large part by Talaat Harb, an Egyptian financier. In 1920, Harb founded Banque Misr, the country's first national bank funded entirely with Egyptian capital, with an initial start-up capital of EGP 80,000 (approximately US$5,000). Harb envisioned a financial institution that would channel national savings into industrial and economic development. His efforts marked a turning point in Egypt's economic history, enabling Egyptians to exert greater control over their country's financial resources and spurring national industrialization.

Beyond banking, Harb spearheaded the establishment of multiple industrial and service ventures across textiles, insurance, shipping, real estate, and media. He founded Studio Misr in 1935, which became Egypt's leading film production hub for over three decades, as well as EgyptAir in 1932, the first airline in the Middle East and the seventh in the world. Through Banque Misr, he also launched companies in cotton ginning, paper manufacturing, and printing, helping to create a vertically integrated national economy. These ventures helped Egypt assert its economic independence and identity during and after the colonial period.

The Great Depression pushed Egypt toward import-substitution industry. In 1930, the expiration of commercial treaties allowed Egypt to set its own tariffs, which helped local industry. On February 16, 1930, Egypt enacted tariff reforms aimed at protecting local industries. The government imposed high duties on imports and reduced taxes on raw materials, encouraging local manufacturing. The changes led to a decline in imports of finished goods and an increase in raw materials and machinery by 1938.

World War II provided a boost to industrialization, with increased demand from Allied forces and local consumers. Many industries diversified, while new enterprises emerged. The war also trained workers, helping to establish a foundation for local industries that expanded in the post-war period. By 1947, the government enacted laws and established an industrial bank to support industrial growth.

=== Early Republican period ===
In July 1952, the Egyptian monarchy was overthrown in a coup led by the Free Officers movement, a group of army officers founded by Gamal Abdel Nasser and formally headed by General Muhammad Naguib. The officers held King Farouk responsible for Egypt's military defeat in the 1948 Arab–Israeli War and the country's persistent socioeconomic problems, including widespread poverty, illiteracy, and underdevelopment. These conditions showed up in the stagnation of per capita gross national product (GNP), which averaged E£43 in 1954 prices between the end of World War I and the 1952 Revolution.

Under Gamal Abdel Nasser, Egypt's economy saw substantial growth driven by agrarian reforms, import substitution, key nationalisation efforts like the Suez Canal Company, and major infrastructure projects, including the Helwan steel works and the Aswan High Dam. Living standards rose sharply, with wider access to housing, education, healthcare, and jobs.

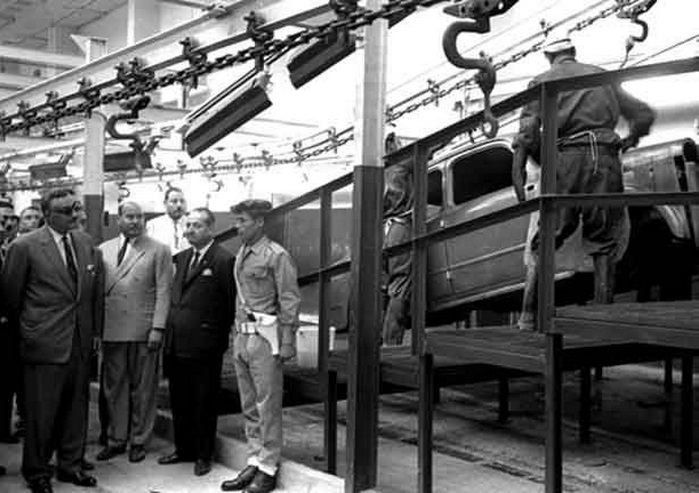
President Nasser at the inauguration of the Nasr Automotive factory in Helwan

The land reforms of 1952 aimed to weaken the old landowning class and promote industrialization, with Nasser's government supporting urban workers through labor reforms. The nationalization of key industries occurred between 1957 and 1961, alongside increased public sector control. While the initial economic results were positive, a crisis emerged by the mid-1960s due to the unsustainable combination of rising consumption and investment.

By necessity if not by design, the revolutionary regime gave considerably greater priority to economic development than did the monarchy. While the economy grew steadily, it sometimes exhibited sharp fluctuations. Analysis of economic growth is further complicated by the difficulty in obtaining reliable statistics. Growth figures are often disputed, and economists contend that growth estimates may be grossly inaccurate because of the informal economy and workers' remittances, which may contribute as much as one-fourth of GNP. According to one estimate, the gross domestic product (GDP), at 1965 constant prices, grew at an annual compound rate of about 4.2 percent between 1955 and 1975. This was about 1.7 times larger than the annual population growth rate of 2.5 percent in the same period.

The period between 1967 and 1974, the final years of Gamal Abdul Nasser's presidency and the early part of Anwar Sadat's, however, were lean years, with growth rates of only about 3.3 percent. The slowdown was caused by many factors, including agricultural and industrial stagnation and the costs of the 1967 war. Investments, which were an important factor for the preceding growth, also nose-dived and recovered only in 1975 after the dramatic 1973 increase in oil prices.

Anwar Sadat’s Infitah, or "Open Door Policy", introduced in 1974, marked a stark departure from Nasser's Arab socialism. This policy led to the emergence of a new ruling coalition, consisting of technocrats, former landowners, and private-sector entrepreneurs. Sadat's changes effectively shifted Egypt towards a capitalist market, contrary to the socialist trajectory some had hoped for following Nasser's reforms.

Like most countries in the Middle East, Egypt partook of the oil boom and suffered the subsequent slump. Available figures suggest that between 1975 and 1980 the GDP (at 1980 prices) grew at an annual rate of more than 11 percent. This came not from manufacturing or agriculture but from oil exports, remittances, foreign aid, and grants. From the mid-1980s, GDP growth slowed as a result of the 1985-86 crash in oil prices. In the two succeeding years, the GDP grew at no more than an annual rate of 2.9 percent. Of concern for the future was the decline of the fixed investment ratio from around 30 percent during most of the 1975-85 decade to 22 percent in 1987.

=== Reform era ===
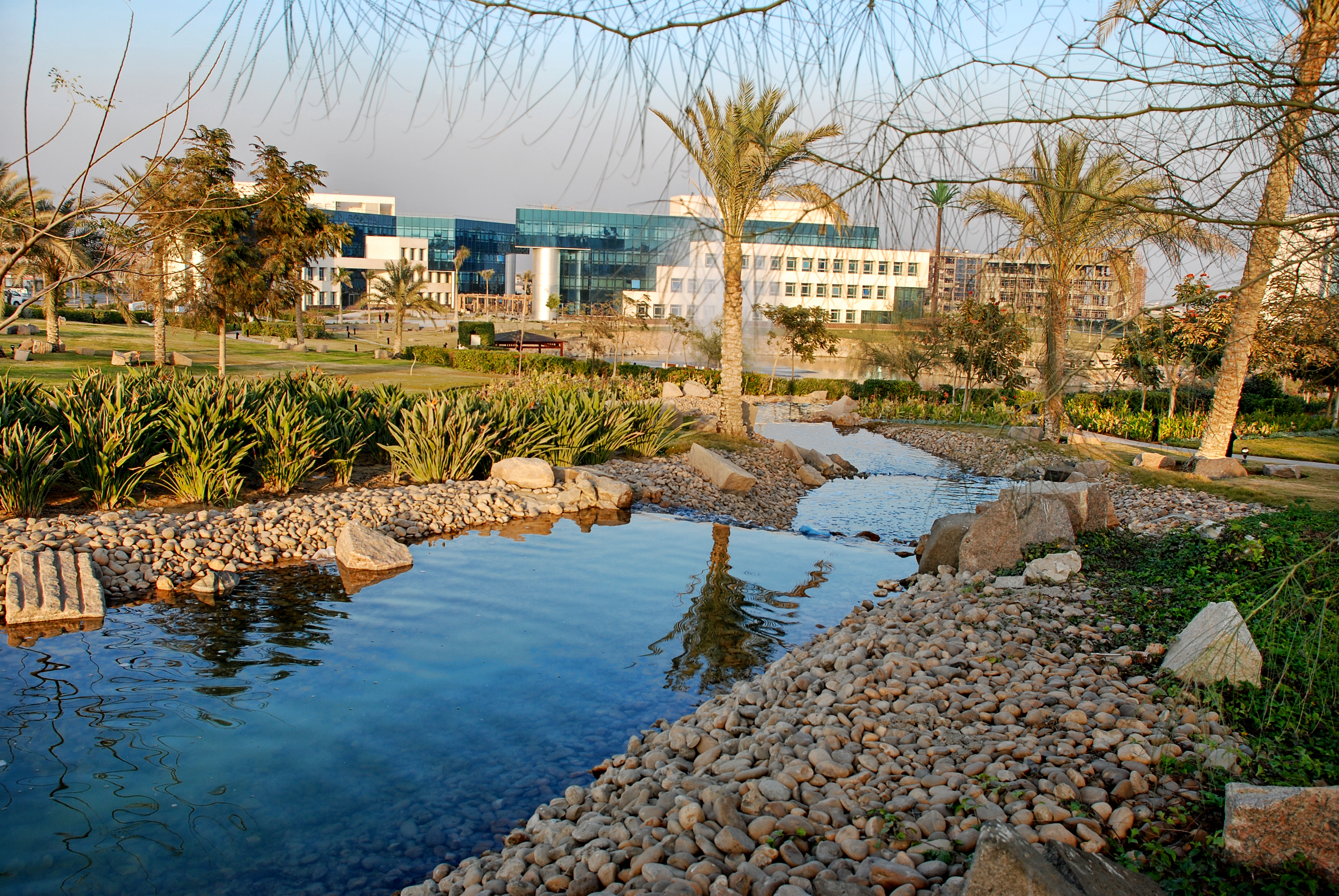
Smart Village, a business district in 6th of October established in 2001 to facilitate the growth of high-tech businesses.

Egypt began implementing neoliberal structural adjustment in the early 1990s to address a worsening macroeconomic situation marked by low growth, double-digit inflation, unsustainable fiscal and current account deficits, and heavy reliance on import restrictions to protect inefficient, state-led industries. These reforms aimed to reduce the country's rentier-state characteristics by shifting economic control from the public to the private sector.

In 1991, these neoliberal reforms unfolded through the Economic Reform and Structural Adjustment Programme (ERSAP), a structural adjustment agreement signed between Mubarak, the International Monetary Fund, and the World Bank. Under the ERSAP, the new, economic policies in Egypt intended to free the economy from government regulation and allow individuals and corporations to regulate the economy based on their self-interests and the free market.

A major shift occurred in 2004 with the appointment of Ahmed Nazif as prime minister. His cabinet introduced a new round of reforms, including the restructuring of the banking sector, increasing the private sector share, and widespread privatization of state-owned enterprises. Efforts to reduce the public debt included cutting subsidies and shrinking the government workforce.

In this period Egypt experienced fluctuating economic growth accompanied by shifting patterns of poverty, inequality, and middle-class formation. The government undertook major policy reforms, with significant changes in income distribution, and debates over whether economic growth was inclusive or "pro-poor".

Despite economic growth, poverty persisted. The proportion of Egyptians living under the national poverty line declined from 24.2% in 1991 to a low of 16.7% in 2000, before rising again to 22% in 2008. Similarly, the share of the population living on less than $2 per day (PPP) fell from 28% in 1990 to 15% by 2008. Absolute extreme poverty, defined as living on less than $1.25 per day, remained relatively low at around 2% from 2000 onward.

Indicator	1980	1990	2000	2005	2010
GDP per capita at constant prices, (E£)	9,548.57	12,507.81	15,437.06	16,680.25	20,226.91
GDP per capita at current prices, (E£)	406.03	1,967.41	5,607.67	8,003.33	16,115.11
GDP per capita at current prices, (US$)	580.04	1,870.85	1,642.63	1,330.46	2,921.76
GDP (PPP) per capita, (Int$)	2,252.47	4,444.05	6,725.83	8,137.14	10,848.16

The Gini index, a measure of income inequality, remained moderate, fluctuating between 30 and 33.8 over the period. The Palma ratio, which captures the income share of the richest 10% compared to the poorest 40%, declined slightly, indicating marginal improvement in distribution.

The middle class, however, exhibited a more complex trajectory. Using absolute income thresholds, the middle class appeared to constitute over 80% of the population by 2008. Yet, when defined using relative or median-based thresholds, its size appeared far smaller, approximately 40% by some estimates, and even declined during periods of high economic growth. This paradox reflected the vulnerability of those just above the poverty line, often labeled as “new strugglers”, who were susceptible to falling back into poverty.

To stimulate investment and trade, the corporate tax rate was lowered from 40 to 20 percent, and tax collection mechanisms were strengthened. Tariff barriers were drastically reduced, and Egypt entered into preferential trade agreements with the United States, the European Union, several Arab and African neighbors, as well as neighboring states. These changes contributed to an improved business climate and growing investor confidence. Between 2003 and 2008, exports of goods and services tripled, tourism surged by over 60 percent, and foreign direct investment rose by 50 percent in 2007 alone. As a result, Egypt's external debt declined to less than 20 percent of GDP by 2009.

Although the 2000s brought strong macroeconomic growth, the benefits were not evenly distributed. Consumption gains were concentrated among the top decile, while lower quintiles saw marginal improvements. So although poverty indicators improved, dissatisfaction remained widespread, with many people seeing little social mobility or security. The disconnect between growth and equitable distribution contributed to mounting discontent in the years leading to the 2011 revolution.

==== Privatization ====
As a result of the limited government role, many public sector companies were privatized. By 2005, the government sold 209 out of a total of 314 public companies to the private sector with financial support from USAID. This privatization increased unemployment and decreased wages and benefits among workers in these public companies. Many of these Egyptians who lost their jobs resorted to informal work as street vendors or drivers in Cairo.

=== 2008 financial crisis ===
The 2008 financial crisis followed closely by the global food crisis hit Egypt hard, but also prompted more coordinated policy reform. Policymakers moved quickly, adjusting monetary and fiscal policy along with regulatory rules. A moderate Financial crisis took hold, partly fueled by fear of widespread panic selling, leading to declines in stock and bond markets and increases in nominal interest rates.

Egypt's population, concentrated within a narrow strip along the Nile River, primarily worked in the services, agriculture, and industrial sectors, with about one-third directly involved in farming. The unemployment rate increased from 10.3% in FY2004 to 11.2% in 2005, exacerbated by the privatization efforts that led to job losses in public enterprises. Private sector employment grew at a faster pace than the public sector.

In response to rising food prices, the Egyptian government, led by President Mubarak, implemented a pay rise of up to 30% for government and public sector workers in 2008. This was part of an effort to strengthen food security for low-income citizens and to balance wages with prices. The decision to double the originally proposed 15%-20% pay rise came as widespread discontent over inflation could lead to social unrest.

The consumer price index (CPI) inflation rate reached 15.8% in March 2008, with food price inflation much higher at 23.7%. These high inflation figures particularly impacted Egypt's poor and low-income citizens, who spent a large portion of their income on food. By April 2008, food inflation reached 22%, making it clear that inflation as measured by the headline CPI did not capture the struggles of the majority of the population, who were enrolled in food ration programs.

Amid these economic pressures, in April 2009, Egypt was concerned about the return of 500,000 Egyptian laborers from Gulf states, which would have further complicated its economic recovery efforts.

=== Post-revolution ===
Following the 2011 revolution, Egypt's economy fell into a severe downturn and struggled to restore growth and investor confidence. Foreign exchange reserves fell from US$36 billion in December 2010 to just US$16.3 billion by January 2012. Concerns over social unrest and financial instability led to repeated downgrades by credit rating agencies. In 2016, Egypt floated its currency and initiated a reform program with a US$12 billion IMF loan to restore macroeconomic stability. The sharp devaluation that followed improved Egypt's external balance but also led to inflationary pressures.

Despite claims by the Central Bank of Egypt that the currency remained free-floating, reports indicated that by 2018 the central bank was actively using state-owned banks to manage the pound's value, effectively returning to a controlled exchange rate. Inflation had eased by May 2019, indicating signs of economic stabilization.

Egypt's economy was then hit by the global COVID-19 crisis, with real growth declining from 5.6% in FY2018/19 to 3.6% in FY2019/20, reflecting a 1.7% contraction during the April–June period of 2020. The pandemic severely impacted the country's primary sources of foreign currency, particularly tourism and the oil and gas industry. Although both sectors began recovering in 2022, they struggled to return to pre-pandemic revenue levels by 2023 when the outbreak of war in Ukraine further strained Egypt's economic position, as Russian and Ukrainian tourists, who form a substantial portion of Egypt's visitor base, were largely absent. Additionally, the conflict led to sharp increases in global commodity prices, particularly wheat, which Egypt imports in large quantities. These factors contributed to a broader economic crisis characterized by a resurgence of the black market due to a shortage of U.S. dollars and other hard currencies.

In 2024, Egypt addressed its latest currency crisis by floating the pound once again, abandoning both implicit and tacit measures to support the currency. This led to a depreciation of nearly 40% and a was followed by a record 600-basis-point interest rate hike. These measures facilitated an expanded $8 billion IMF loan, part of a broader $20 billion support package from European Union, the World Bank, Japan and the UK. The currency stabilized and investor confidence improved, with Moody's upgrading Egypt's credit outlook and local stocks rallying. One of the main components of this recovery process was Egypt's $35 billion investment deal with the UAE for the development of Ras El Hekma, the largest foreign investment in the country's history. Egypt also made fiscal adjustments, agreeing with the IMF to raise the tax-to-revenue ratio and accelerate the privatization of state-owned companies to strengthen public finances. Both the IMF and the World Bank predicted 3.8% growth in the Egyptian economy in the fiscal year 2024/2025.

== Data ==
The following tables shows the main economic indicators in 1986–2021 (with IMF staff estimates in 2022–2027).

1980s
Year	GDP (bn US$ PPP)	GDP per capita (US$ PPP)	GDP (bn US$ nominal)	GDP per capita (US$ nominal)	GDP growth (real)	Inflation (%)	Unemployment (%)	Government debt (% of GDP)
1980	88.5	2,183.1	23.5	580.0	3.4%	20.5%	n/a	n/a
1981	▲99.0	▲2,374.7	▲25.8	▲617.7	2.2%	10.4%	n/a	n/a
1982	▲112.8	▲2,633.4	▲30.5	▲711.4	7.3%	14.9%	n/a	n/a
1983	▲127.7	▲2,900.3	▲37.3	▲846.4	8.9%	16.0%	n/a	n/a
1984	▲142.9	▲3,158.3	▲41.9	▲926.0	8.0%	17.1%	n/a	n/a
1985	▲158.3	▲3,401.8	▲48.8	▲1,049.3	7.4%	12.1%	n/a	n/a
1986	▲169.2	▲3,543.6	▲54.1	▲1,132.5	4.8%	23.9%	n/a	n/a
1987	▲180.8	▲3,705.0	▲77.4	▲1,585.2	4.3%	25.2%	n/a	n/a
1988	▲194.7	▲3,908.8	▲92.5	▲1,858.0	4.0%	15.2%	n/a	n/a
1989	▲208.3	▲4,093.2	▲115.4	▲2,266.4	3.0%	20.1%	n/a	n/a

1990s
Year	GDP (bn US$ PPP)	GDP per capita (US$ PPP)	GDP (bn US$ nominal)	GDP per capita (US$ nominal)	GDP growth (real)	Inflation (%)	Unemployment (%)	Government debt (% of GDP)
1990	▲221.2	▲4,307.2	▼96.1	▼1,870.8	2.4%	21.2%	8.0%	n/a
1991	▲233.5	▲4,454.2	▼48.4	▼923.8	2.1%	14.7%	▲8.8%	n/a
1992	▲239.5	▲4,476.7	▼44.2	▼825.4	0.3%	21.1%	▲9.0%	n/a
1993	▲252.3	▲4,571.2	▲49.5	▲897.2	2.9%	11.0%	▲10.9%	n/a
1994	▲268.5	▲4,769.3	▲54.6	▲968.9	4.2%	9.0%	▲11.1%	n/a
1995	▲286.4	▲4,972.8	▲63.3	▲1,098.1	4.5%	9.4%	▲11.2%	n/a
1996	▲305.9	▲5,202.5	▲71.1	▲1,209.5	4.9%	7.1%	▼9.5%	n/a
1997	▲329.6	▲5,484.2	▲79.8	▲1,327.4	5.9%	6.2%	▼8.7%	n/a
1998	▲358.5	▲5,847.5	▲89.2	▲1,455.0	7.5%	5.0%	▼8.0%	73.8%
1999	▲385.7	▲6,161.6	▲95.0	▲1,518.2	6.1%	3.7%	▼7.7%	▼72.4%

2000s
Year	GDP (bn US$ PPP)	GDP per capita (US$ PPP)	GDP (bn US$ nominal)	GDP per capita (US$ nominal)	GDP growth (real)	Inflation (%)	Unemployment (%)	Government debt (% of GDP)
2000	▲415.7	▲6,495.1	▲104.8	▲1,636.8	5.4%	2.8%	▲9.0%	▼71.7%
2001	▲440.0	▲6,738.6	▼102.3	▼1,566.2	3.5%	2.4%	▼8.8%	▲79.1%
2002	▲461.1	▲6,923.8	▼90.3	▼1,355.3	3.2%	2.3%	▲10.1%	▲85.8%
2003	▲485.2	▲7,135.9	▼85.2	▼1,252.4	3.2%	3.4%	▲11.3%	▲97.1%
2004	▲518.7	▲7,484.3	▼82.9	▼1,195.6	4.1%	8.2%	▼10.5%	▼96.5%
2005	▲558.8	▲7,904.4	▲94.1	▲1,331.4	4.5%	8.7%	▲11.5%	▲98.3%
2006	▲615.5	▲8,525.1	▲112.9	▲1,563.7	6.8%	4.3%	▼10.9%	▼85.9%
2007	▲677.0	▲9,197.8	▲137.1	▲1,862.2	7.1%	10.9%	▼9.2%	▼76.3%
2008	▲739.3	▲9,831.2	▲170.8	▲2,271.2	7.2%	11.7%	▼8.7%	▼66.8%
2009	▲778.8	▲10,127.7	▲198.3	▲2,578.9	4.7%	16.2%	▲9.4%	▲69.5%

2010s
Year	GDP (bn US$ PPP)	GDP per capita (US$ PPP)	GDP (bn US$ nominal)	GDP per capita (US$ nominal)	GDP growth (real)	Inflation (%)	Unemployment (%)	Government debt (% of GDP)
2010	▲828.8	▲10,530.5	▲230.0	▲2,922.8	5.1%	11.7%	▼9.2%	▲69.6%
2011	▲860.9	▲10,694.4	▲247.7	▲3,077.3	1.8%	11.1%	▲10.4%	▲72.8%
2012	▲958.7	▲11,620.1	▲278.8	▲3,379.0	2.2%	8.7%	▲12.4%	▲73.8%
2013	▲992.0	▲11,726.0	▲288.0	▲3,404.3	3.3%	6.9%	▲13.0%	▲84.0%
2014	▼985.3	▼11,350.9	▲305.6	▲3,520.4	2.9%	10.1%	▲13.4%	▲85.1%
2015	▲1,064.2	▲11,957.7	▲332.1	▲3,731.2	4.4%	11.0%	▼12.9%	▲88.3%
2016	▼1,057.1	▼11,616.3	▲332.5	▼3,653.7	4.3%	10.2%	▼12.7%	▲96.8%
2017	▲1,062.3	▼11,158.3	▼236.5	▼2,484.5	4.1%	23.5%	▼12.2%	▲103.0%
2018	▲1,145.4	▲11,796.5	▲250.3	▲2,577.3	5.3%	20.9%	▼10.9%	▼92.5%
2019	▲1,230.7	▲12,444.2	▲302.3	▲3,057.0	5.6%	13.9%	▼8.6%	▼84.2%

2020s
Year	GDP (bn US$ PPP)	GDP per capita (US$ PPP)	GDP (bn US$ nominal)	GDP per capita (US$ nominal)	GDP growth (real)	Inflation (%)	Unemployment (%)	Government debt (% of GDP)
2020	▲1,290.0	▲12,823.3	▲364.0	▲3,618.5	3.6%	5.7%	▼8.3%	▲89.6%
2021	▲1,388.3	▲13,529.9	▲402.8	▲3,925.8	3.3%	4.5%	▼7.3%	▲93.5%
2022	▲1,562.4	▲14,927.5	▲435.6	▲4,162.1	5.9%	7.5%	▼6.9%	▲94.0%
2023	▲1,690.5	▲15,834.8	▲450.4	▲4,218.5	5.0%	11.0%	6.9%	▼89.6%
2024	▲1,826.9	▲16,777.4	▲489.0	▲4,490.6	5.5%	7.4%	6.9%	▼88.2%
2025	▲1,971.8	▲17,752.9	▲535.8	▲4,824.4	5.8%	7.4%	▼6.8%	▼86.1%
2026	▲2,127.9	▲18,782.3	▲584.9	▲5,162.9	5.8%	7.4%	▼6.6%	▼83.6%
2027	▲2,298.2	▲19,888.2	▲638.1	▲5,522.3	5.9%	7.4%	▼6.4%	▼80.7%

== Capital flows ==
=== International trade ===
Egypt's international trade has long been central to its economy, at 40% of GDP according to the World Bank. Over the years, the country has pursued greater economic integration through a series of free trade agreements, including those with the EU-Egypt Association Agreement and the African Continental Free Trade Area (AfCFTA). The association agreement with the EU, in force since 2004, established a free-trade area by eliminating tariffs on industrial goods and facilitating agricultural trade. A subsequent agreement in 2010 expanded this arrangement to processed agricultural and fisheries products. Falling customs duties strengthened trade ties, and EU-Egypt trade more than doubled from €11.8 billion in 2004 to €27.9 billion in 2017.

The Pan-Arab Free Trade Area (PAFTA), signed by 17 Arab League members in 1981 and implemented in 1997, aims to boost trade among Arab states by eliminating non-tariff barriers and gradually reducing tariffs. Originally planned to achieve full tariff removal by 2007, an Arab League summit in 2002 accelerated this timeline, establishing a zero-tariff trade zone by 2005 while granting preferential treatment to the least developed member states.

Egypt's Advance Cargo Information system makes the Advance Cargo Information Declaration (ACID) number a requirement for imports into the nation, as cargo data and supporting documents must be submitted in advance through the Nafeza blockchain platform before shipment. Egyptian Customs introduced the ACI system in phases, making it mandatory for sea freight on October 1st 2021, and extending the requirement to air freight by January 1st 2026. In practice, the ACID number is used to pre-register shipments, support customs risk assessment, and help avoid clearance delays; shipments that do not comply with the ACI rules may not be cleared.

Egypt also benefits from Qualified Industrial Zones (QIZs), which grant tariff-free access to U.S. markets for exports meeting predefined rules of origin. These zones offer cost advantages, exemption from non-tariff barriers, and access to Egypt's large labor pool, attracting both local and foreign investors. Initially established in Alexandria, the Suez Canal, Greater Cairo, and the Central Delta, the program has since expanded to Minya and Beni Suef.

Petroleum and natural gas have historically dominated both exports and imports. In addition to hydrocarbons, Egypt exports a diverse range of goods, including textiles, fertilizers, plastics, and agricultural products. Imports, meanwhile, are characterized by a high demand for intermediate and investment goods, to support the needs of the country's industrial and infrastructure sectors. Goods such as iron, steel, plastics, wheat, and pharmaceuticals also constitute a substantial share of inbound trade.

Egypt's exports have seen significant growth in the past years, reaching $51.1 billion in 2023, with the government aiming to increase exports to $145 billion by 2030. A new export support program, expected to launch in early 2026, will focus on competitiveness by raising the value of Egyptian products and offering incentives to small companies and start-ups. Together with paying off overdue dues, it aims to help exporters, spread support fairly, and encourage investment

=== Remittances ===
Remittances from Egyptians working abroad are a major source of hard currency for the Egyptian economy. The Minister of Emigration and Expatriate Affairs reported that the number of Egyptians living abroad has increased more than fivefold since 2013, rising from 2.7 million in 2013 to 14 million in 2023 and according to the Central Bank of Egypt (CBE), remittances reached $23.7 billion between January and October 2024, reflecting a 45.3% increase from $16.3 billion during the same period in 2023.

Remittances recorded a decline during 2022/2023, when inflows dropped to $22.1 billion from a peak of $31.9 billion in 2021/2022, figures rebounded in 2024. This was attributed to global disruptions from the COVID-19 pandemic, exchange rate volatility, and geopolitical factors, including the Russian-Ukrainian war. The March 2024 economic measures, particularly the liberalization of exchange rates and increased interest rates on Egyptian pound and dollar-denominated savings instruments, helped bring remittance inflows back into the formal banking system.

The government treats remittances as vital and wants them to keep growing. It has introduced measures to attract remittances, including offering dollar savings certificates with some of the highest interest rates globally, according to the Minister of Emigration and Expatriate Affairs. The aim is to raise foreign currency inflows and pull remittances into the formal banking system.

Additional incentives include customs exemptions for cars imported for personal use, requiring a foreign currency deposit refundable in Egyptian pounds after five years at the prevailing exchange rate. The government has also introduced a final exemption from compulsory conscription for draft evaders or male students abroad over the age of 18, available for a fee of $5,000 or €5,000. The state has also promoted real estate sales in foreign currency, offering land and property to Egyptians abroad and foreign investors.

According to a study by the International Organization for Migration, most remittance-receiving households use the funds for daily expenses, but 20% portion is invested in real estate, small businesses, and other economic activities.

=== Suez Canal ===
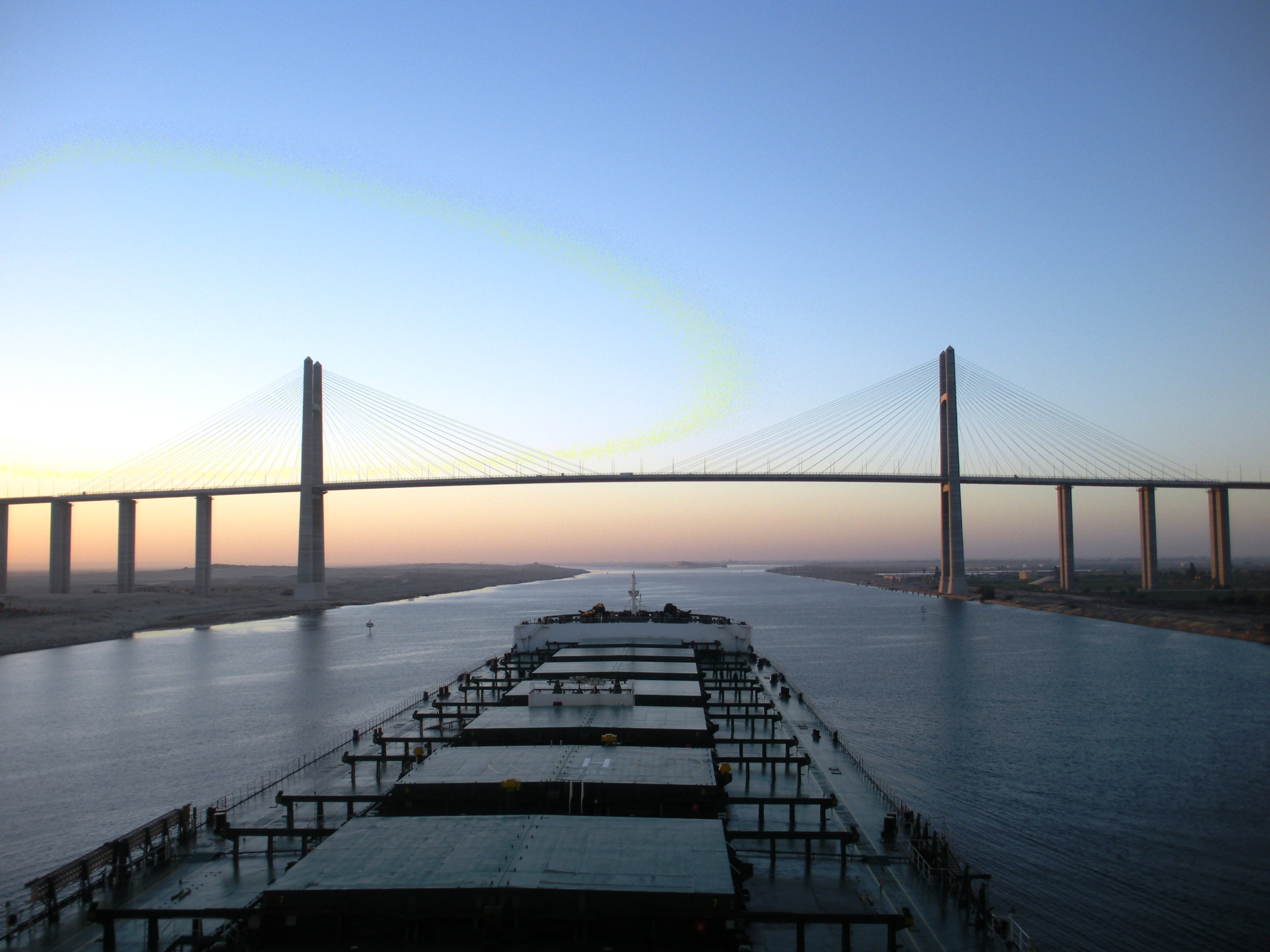
Vessel transiting through the Suez Canal

The Suez Canal, which links the Mediterranean Sea to the Red Sea, has been a major artery of world trade since it opened in 1869. Constructed under the direction of Ferdinand de Lesseps, the canal provided a direct shipping route between Europe and Asia, cutting travel time by avoiding the long voyage around the Cape of Good Hope. Over the decades, the canal has undergone multiple expansions to accommodate the growing volume of global maritime trade. In 2021, more than 20,600 vessels passed through the canal, with an average of 56 ships per day. To raise capacity, the government launched an expansion project in 2014, widening key sections of the canal and nearly doubling its capacity from 49 to 97 ships per day.

The New Suez Canal, inaugurated in 2015, introduced a parallel shipping lane and deepened sections of the original canal to accommodate larger vessels. The expansion aimed to reduce transit times from 18 to 11 hours and cut waiting times for ships. The project, costing about $8 billion, was financed exclusively through domestic investment, with Egyptians contributing via bank certificates of deposit yielding 12%, later raised to 15.5%. The Armed Forces Engineering Authority played a major role in the excavation and construction of the expansion, which was completed in just one year.

Beyond shipping, the Suez Canal has become an economic hub in its own right through the Suez Canal Economic Zone (SCZONE). Encompassing 461 square kilometres (178 square miles) across Port Said, Ismailia, and Suez, the SCZONE offers zero customs rates to attract foreign investment. Major infrastructure projects within the zone focus on the development of East Port Said and Ain Sokhna, with planned expansions to West Port Said, El-Adabiya, Arish, and El Tor. The zone is part of an effort to turn the canal into a global trade and logistics center, with Egypt aiming to attract $30 billion in investment within five years. The canal remains one of the world's busiest trade routes, and set a record annual revenue of $9.4 billion in the fiscal year ending June 2023.

== Currency ==
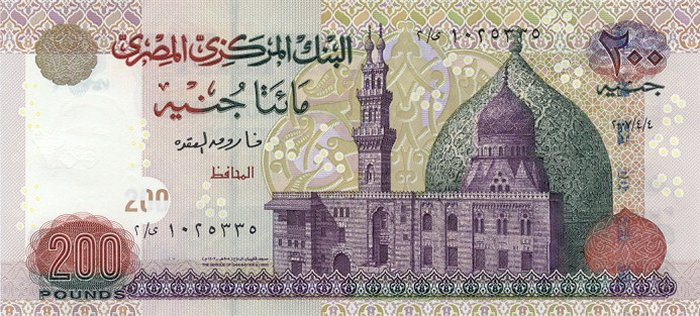
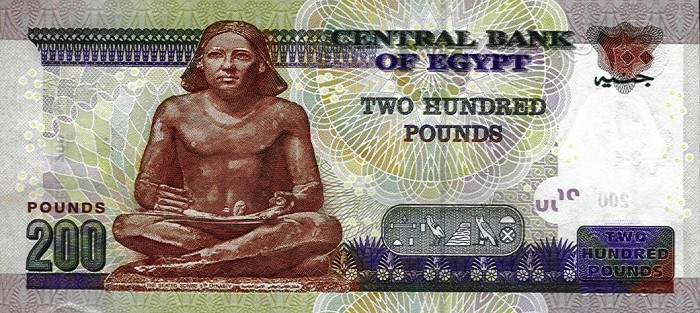
A 200 Egyptian pound note

The Egyptian pound is the official currency and legal tender of Egypt. It is designated by the ISO 4217 code EGP and is often represented by the symbols E£ or £E, and LE, from French livre égyptienne.

The Central Bank of Egypt is the sole authority responsible for issuing banknotes and coinage. It formulates and implements the country's monetary, credit, and banking policies; regulates the foreign exchange market and determines the exchange rate regime; supervises the banking sector to maintain financial stability; and manages Egypt's gold and foreign currency reserves.

=== History of exchange rate policy ===
==== 19th century ====
In the 19th century, Egypt's currency system was based on the piastre (qirsh), subdivided into 40 para. Although formally equal to its Ottoman counterpart after the 1840 Turkish-Egyptian treaty, the Egyptian piastre was typically valued higher, leading to disparities in exchange, such as 10 Egyptian piastres equaling 11 Turkish piastres around the mid-19th century,. Egypt adopted a bimetallic standard in 1834, basing its system on the Maria Theresa thaler, known as abu taqa in Egypt, which was valued at 20 piastres. The 1830s saw the introduction of new gold and silver coins, yet foreign coins like the British sovereign continued to circulate at unofficial rates.

The 1885 currency reform led to the adoption of the gold standard, introducing the Egyptian pound (jeneih) at E£1 = 7.4375 grams of fine gold. Pegged to the British gold sovereign, it maintained an exchange value of 97.5 piastres per pound sterling, replacing the Egyptian piastre (qirsh) as the primary currency unit. This reform standardized foreign exchange rates by law and adjusted the Maria Theresa thaler to 21 piastres, while 20 piastres equaled 5 French francs.

==== 20th century ====
With the outbreak of World War I, Egypt abandoned the gold standard and pegged its currency to the British pound at a fixed rate, which remained until 1962 when it shifted to the U.S. dollar. In 1969, Egypt adopted a multiple exchange rate system to address two key challenges. It helped mitigate the negative effects of an overvalued currency on external competitiveness while also managing the country's heavy reliance on workers’ remittances.

By the 1980s, external shocks, including declining oil prices and rising debt, exposed the vulnerabilities of Egypt's economy. The government attempted exchange rate liberalization in 1987, reducing multiple exchange rates from five to three, implementing a gradual devaluation, and establishing a free exchange market. However, these measures proved insufficient due to Egypt's continued dependence on external revenues from oil, the Suez Canal, and remittances, and by the early 1990s, Egypt faced mounting fiscal deficits, inflation, and a balance of payments crisis.

In response, the Economic Reform and Structural Adjustment Program was launched in 1991, backed by the IMF and World Bank. This program sought to unify exchange rates, liberalize trade, and reduce state intervention. The Egyptian pound was pegged to the U.S. dollar, supported by tight fiscal policies and high-interest rates. While this approach stabilized inflation and attracted capital inflows, it led to a gradual overvaluation of the currency, reducing competitiveness and straining foreign exchange reserves.

The late 1990s and early 2000s saw growing pressure on the fixed exchange rate system due to external shocks, including the 1997 Asian financial crisis and declining oil prices.

==== 21st century ====
By 2003, Egypt adopted a managed float, allowing greater currency flexibility while still maintaining central bank interventions. Persistent trade imbalances and political instability following the 2011 revolution led to renewed currency pressures. A foreign exchange black market sprung up, and by 2016, Egypt was forced to implement a full float of the pound under an IMF-backed reform program. The sharp devaluation that followed improved Egypt's external balance but also led to inflationary pressures.

By 2018, despite official claims of a free float, the Central Bank of Egypt was reportedly intervening through state-owned banks to manage the pound's value. The COVID-19 pandemic and later the Russia-Ukraine war further weakened Egypt's external position, disrupting tourism, raising commodity prices, and triggering a dollar shortage that revived the black market.

In 2024, the government floated the pound again, leading to a 40% depreciation and a 600-basis-point interest rate hike. This unlocked an $8 billion IMF loan within a $20 billion international support package and helped stabilize the currency. Recovery was further supported by a $35 billion investment deal with the UAE to develop Ras El Hekma, the largest foreign investment in Egypt's history.

== Natural resources ==
=== Arable land ===
Satellite images depicting the reclamation of desert landscapes on the outskirts of the Nile Delta into agricultural land, before (left) and after (right).

Practically all Egyptian agriculture takes place in some 42,000 square kilometres (10 million acres) of fertile soil in the Nile Valley and Delta, with the rest of the country being primarily desert. Egypt's generally favorable climate allows for the cultivation of multiple crops annually, with most fields producing two crops per year and some vegetable areas reaching a cropping index of 300 percent.

Since 2009, desertification has become a serious problem. To address this, as well as its limited arable land and growing population, Egypt has long pursued land reclamation, with efforts dating back to the 1930s. Since then, 2.6 million feddan have been reclaimed, increasing agricultural land by 44%. The latest initiative aims to reclaim 4.5 million feddan by 2027, nearly half of Egypt's existing cultivated land. The largest of these projects, the New Delta Project, spans 2.2 million feddan, the project accounts for about 25% of the country's historically reclaimed agricultural lands. The Future of Egypt, the first phase of this initiative, covers 1 million feddan and includes an industrial zone for agricultural industries.

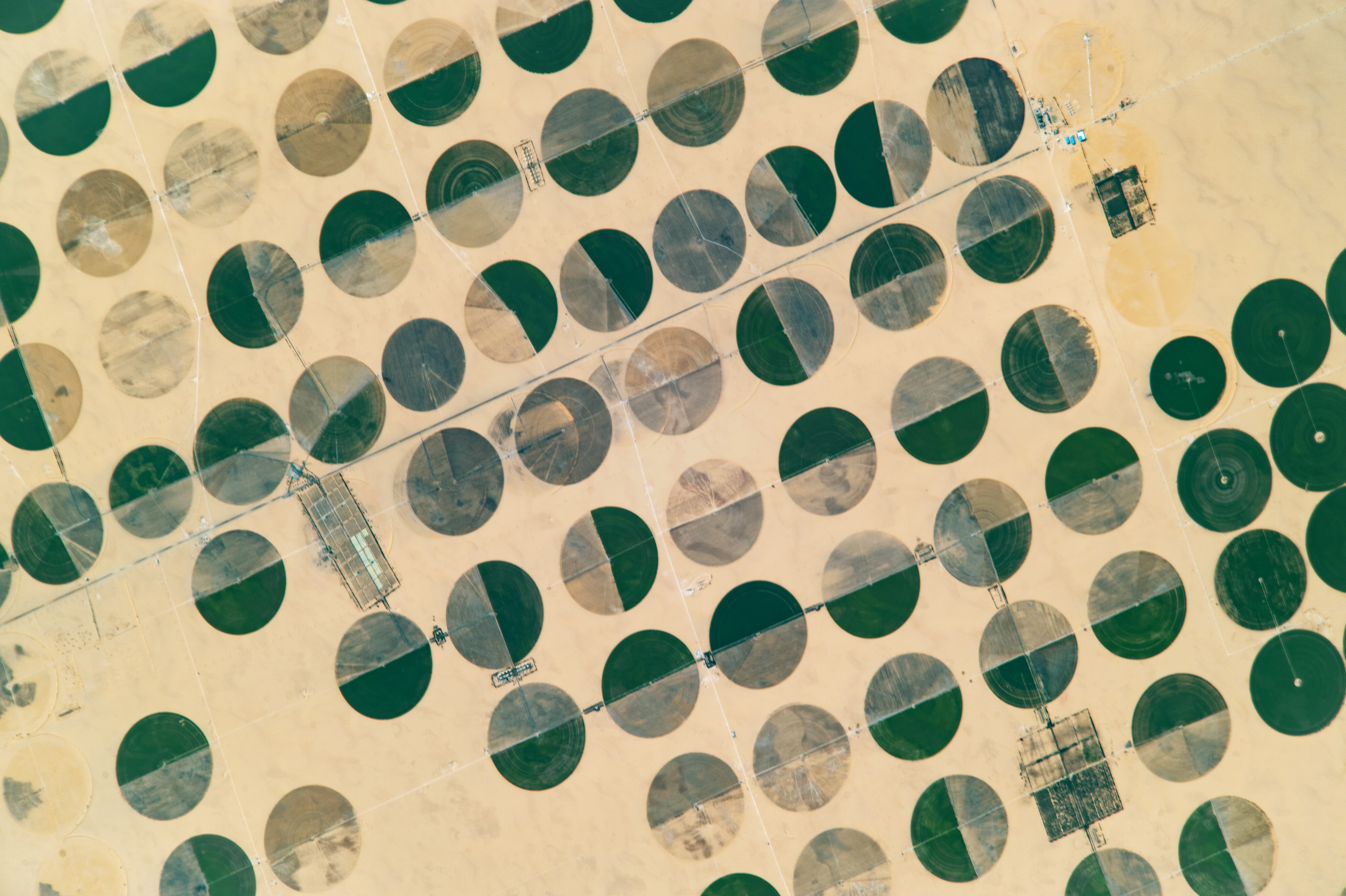
Center-pivot irrigation in the Sharq El Owainat project

To supply the project with water and support its push to expand farmland and shore up water security, Egypt built the New Delta Wastewater Treatment Plant, the largest of its kind globally. With a daily capacity of 7.5 million cubic metres (1,600 million imperial gallons), the plant supports irrigation and cuts pollution in Lake Mariout and the Mediterranean Sea.

The Toshka Project, begun in the 1990s, was revived under President El-Sisi's administration. It aims to reclaim 1.5 million feddan in the Western Desert using water from Lake Nasser, transported via the Sheikh Zayed Canal.

Acquisition and ownership of desert land in Egypt is governed by the Egyptian Desert Land Law (Law No. 143 of 1981). It defines desert land as the land two kilometers outside the border of the city.

=== Water resources ===
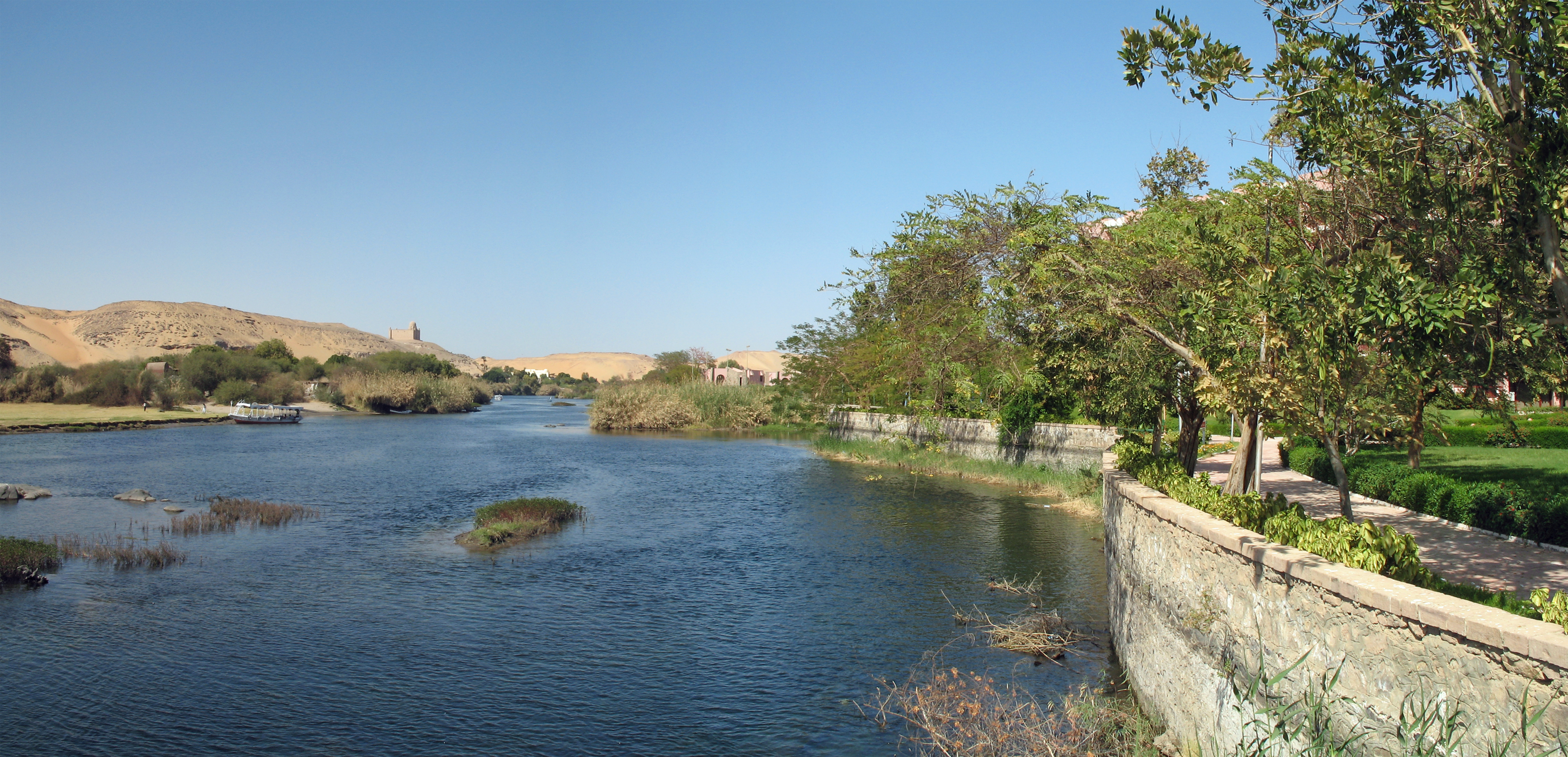
The Nile river at Aswan.

"Egypt", wrote the Greek historian Herodotus 25 centuries ago, "is the gift of the Nile". Due to the country's arid climate and minimal rainfall, most of Egypt's population and farming is concentrated along the Nile Valley and Nile Delta. The Nile Valley in Egypt is a narrow, elongated corridor of fertile land that cuts through an otherwise arid and hyper-arid landscape. Bordered by desert plateaus to the east and west, the valley forms a ribbon of greenery stretching from the Sudanese border in the south to the Nile Delta in the north.

To manage its limited water resources, Egypt constructed the Aswan High Dam, completed in 1970, which created Lake Nasser, one of the world's largest artificial reservoirs with a total storage capacity of 130 billion cubic metres (29 trillion imperial gallons). The dam regulates Nile flows, enabling year-round irrigation, and mitigates flood and drought cycles. With a fixed annual release of 55 billion cubic metres (12 trillion imperial gallons), as stipulated by the 1959 Nile Waters Agreement between Egypt and Sudan, it constitutes 97 percent of the country's renewable water resources.

Facing increasing water scarcity and rising demand, Egypt has made treated wastewater reuse part of its national water policy. The volume of wastewater produced in Egypt is approximately 16.4 billion m^{3} annually, comprising 4.4 billion m^{3} of municipal sewage and 12 billion m^{3} of agricultural drainage water. As of recent estimates, Egypt operates over 400 wastewater treatment plants employing a range of technologies including activated sludge, oxidation ponds, up-flow anaerobic sludge blankets, and membrane bioreactors. Treated wastewater is primarily reused for agricultural irrigation.

==== Rainfall ====
Rainfall in Egypt is minimal, with significant precipitation occurring only along the northern coast, where annual averages range between 50 and 250 millimetres. Rainfall increases eastward, reaching about 150 mm in Arish and 250 mm in Rafah. Based on average winter precipitation, the volume of rainwater falling over the northern regions of Egypt, which cover an area of approximately 200,000 km^{2}, is estimated at 5 to 10 billion m^{3} per year. Of this, about 1.5 billion m^{3} contributes to surface runoff, while most of the remainder evaporates or percolates into the groundwater system. In the Sinai Peninsula, surface runoff from rainfall amounts to approximately 131.67 million m^{3} per year, constituting 5.25% of total rainfall there. Only 200–300 million m^{3} are effectively harvested in regions such as Sinai, the north coast, and the Red Sea mountains.

==== Desalination ====
Desalination plays a growing role in Egypt's water strategy, particularly in coastal areas lacking conventional freshwater sources. Although seawater contains high salinity levels of up to 35,000 ppm, modern desalination technologies can produce high-quality drinking water. However, the process remains costly, with expenses influenced by the type of energy, technology used, and project scale. Egypt currently operates 90 desalination plants with a combined capacity of 1.3 billion m^{3} annually, built at a cost of $0.4 billion. Of these, 76 are fully operational, producing 850,000 m^{3} per day.

Egypt has a long-term plan to tackle chronic water scarcity by expanding desalination. Under this national plan, the country seeks to quadruple its seawater desalination output through the construction of 21 new plants. Together they would add 3.3 million m^{3} per day, easing pressure on the Nile. In a subsequent phase, Egypt plans to boost total desalination capacity by an additional 8.8 million m^{3} per day, with a projected investment of $8 billion.

==== Groundwater ====
Egypt's groundwater resources consist of both renewable and non-renewable aquifers. Renewable groundwater is primarily drawn from two shallow reservoirs associated with the Nile River system: the Nile Valley aquifer, with reserves estimated at 200 billion m^{3}, and the Delta aquifer, with reserves of about 400 billion m^{3}. As of 2017, an estimated 7.2 billion m^{3} of groundwater was extracted annually, with the Delta aquifer accounting for approximately 85 percent of this total. This extraction rate remains below the estimated safe limit of 7.5 billion m^{3} per year, according to the Groundwater Research Institute. Groundwater quality in these regions is generally high, with salinity levels ranging from 300 to 800 parts per million in the southern Delta.

Non-renewable groundwater sources are located in the deeper aquifer systems of the Eastern and Western Desert and the Sinai Peninsula. The most significant among them is the Nubian Sandstone Aquifer System, the world's largest known fossil water aquifer system. This underground reservoir, beneath the eastern end of the Sahara desert, extends across the political boundaries of four northeastern African countries. The system spans approximately 2.2 million km^{2}, with about 826,000 km^{2} located in Egypt, nearly 40% of the total area and the largest share among the four countries, covering over 80% of the country's land surface. Estimates of its total freshwater volume are as high as 500,000 billion m^{3}. Due to the depth of the aquifer and associated extraction costs, current withdrawals in Egypt are limited to approximately 0.6 billion m^{3} annually, primarily for irrigation in land reclamation projects. Sustainable extraction is projected to increase to 2.5–3 billion m^{3} per year in the future, contingent on cost-effective pumping technologies.

=== Mineral and energy resources ===
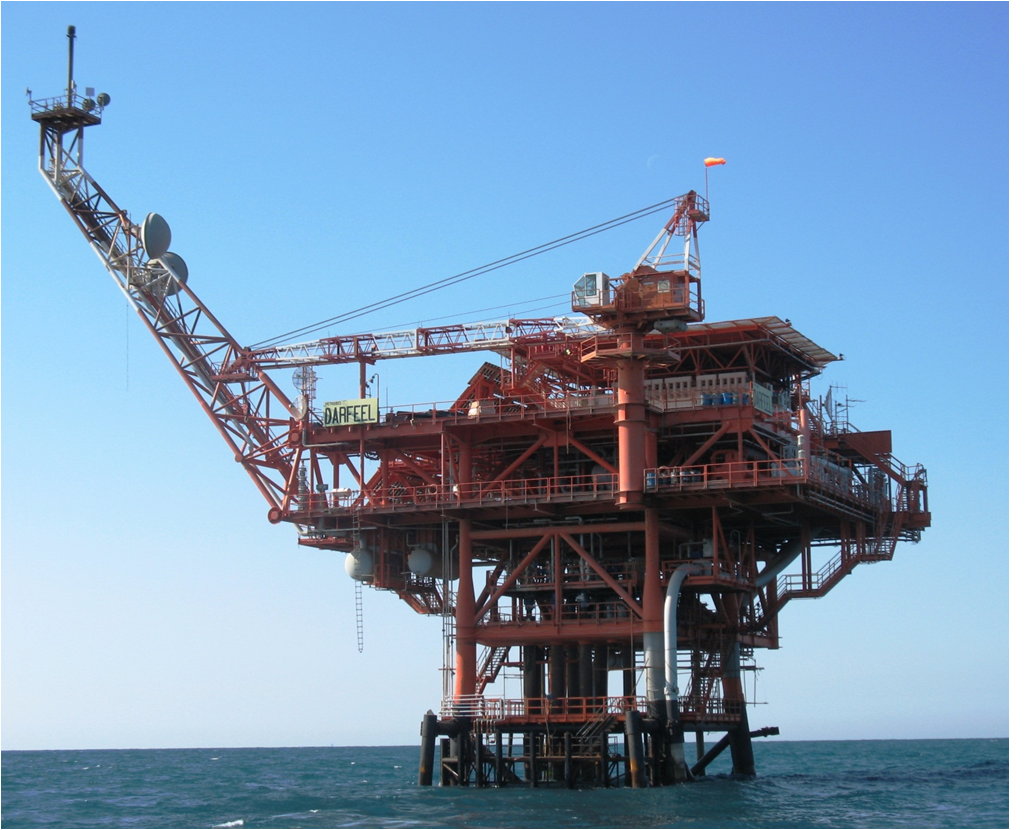
An offshore platform in the Darfeel Gas Field

Egypt has substantial mineral wealth, both petroleum and non-petroleum. The country has deposits of gold, copper, iron ore, phosphate, uranium, tantalum, manganese, chromium, coal, zinc, lead, tin, and black sand minerals such as ilmenite, zircon, rutile, and magnetite It also produces industrial materials like granite, marble, limestone, white sand, kaolin, and feldspar. These resources are primarily located in the Eastern Desert, Western Desert, Sinai Peninsula, and Alaqa Valley.

The Eastern Desert hosts over 1,000 ancient mining sites, including Egypt's largest gold mine, Sukari, which began production in 2009 and has since produced over 5 million ounces of gold. Egypt's gold exports reached $1.63 billion in 2022. The country's known reserves include 3.1 billion metric tons of iron ore near Aswan, 48 million tons of tantalite in South Sinai, and 16 million tons of coal in North Sinai. Uranium is found in the Eastern Desert and Sinai, with estimated reserves of 1,900 metric tons. Manganese deposits at Um Bogma are estimated at 1.7 million tons, and copper reserves are about 1.6 million tons. The country also holds an estimated 700,000 tons of tin.

Petroleum remains central to Egypt's economy, at roughly 25% of GDP. As of late 2023, Egypt had proven oil reserves of 3.1 billion barrels, with production around 559,000 barrels per day, and natural gas reserves of 2.1 trillion cubic meters, producing 175 million cubic meters per day.

== Main economic sectors ==
=== Agricultural sector ===
==== Irrigation ====
Development of agricultural output of Egypt in 2015 US$ since 1961

Irrigation plays a major role in Egypt, the very livelihood of which depends upon a single river, the Nile. The Aswan High Dam, completed in 1971, is the largest irrigation project in the country. A report from the National Council for Production and Economic Affairs in March 1975 reflected the dam's success in regulating floodwaters and providing a reliable water supply. It also noted that water consumption had run ahead of expectations, and that measures to curb it were under consideration. Some fertile land was lost due to the cessation of the flow of Nile silt, and rising salinity became a problem. Additionally, a period of drought in the Ethiopia highlands, the source of the Nile's waters, caused the level of Lake Nasser, the dam's reservoir, to reach its lowest point in 1987.

In the 1970s, despite considerable investments in land reclamation, agriculture gradually lost its place as the primary sector of the economy. Agricultural exports, which accounted for 87% of Egypt's merchandise export value in 1960, had declined to 35% by 1974 and 11% by 2001. As of the 2020s, agriculture accounts for approximately 10% of Egypt's GDP and provides employment for 18% of the labor force.

In 2010 Egypt's fertile area totaled about 3.6 million hectares (8.9 million acres), about one-quarter of which has been reclaimed from the desert after the construction of the Aswan High Dam. The government aims to increase this number to 4.8 million hectares by 2030 through additional land reclamation. Even though only 3 percent of the land is arable, it is extremely productive and can be cropped two or even three times annually. However, the reclaimed lands only add 7 percent to the total value of agricultural production. Surface irrigation is forbidden by law in reclaimed lands and is only used in the Nile Valley and the Delta, the use of pressurized irrigation and localized irrigation is compulsory in other parts of the country. Most land is cropped at least twice a year, but agricultural productivity is limited by salinity which in 2011 affected 25% of irrigated agriculture to varying degrees. This is mainly caused by insufficient drainage as well as seawater intrusion in aquifers as a result of over-extraction of groundwater, the latter primarily affects the Nile Delta. Thanks to the installation of drainage systems a reduction in salinized areas from about 1.2 million hectares in 1972 to 900 000 hectares in 2010 was achieved.

==== Crops ====
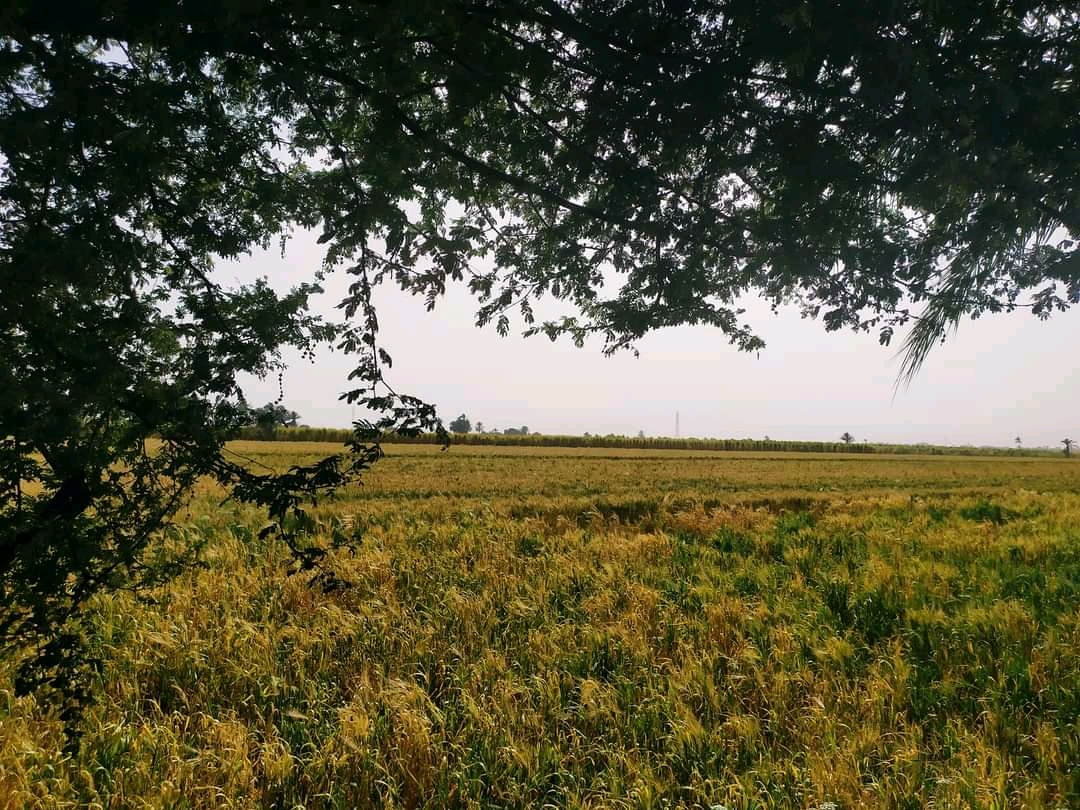
A wheat field in Qena, Egypt

According to 2022 statistics from the Food and Agriculture Organization of the United Nations, Egypt is the world's largest producer of dates and artichokes; the second largest producer of figs and fava beans; the third largest producer of onions, eggplants, and rabbit meat; the fourth largest producer of strawberries, garlic, buffalo and goose meat as well as the fifth largest producer of buffalo milk, tomatoes and watermelon.

The country has achieved self-sufficiency in several key agricultural products, including vegetables, fruits, poultry, dairy, eggs, and rice, while nearing full self-sufficiency in sugar and fish, with production reaching approximately 90% of demand. Self-sufficiency ratios are lower for red meat (60%), cereals (58%), vegetable oils (26%), and oil crops (35%). Consequently, Egypt relies on imports for roughly 45% of its domestic food demand.

Cotton has long been a primary exported cash crop, but it is no longer vital as an export. Egypt is a substantial producer of wheat, maize, sugarcane, fruit and vegetables, fodder, and rice; but also needs to import significant quantities of wheat and maize, primarily from Ukraine and Russia, despite yield increases since 1970. This is largely due to high domestic demand, driven by subsidies and a culinary preference for bread, alongside Egypt's limited arable land and a focus on cultivating high-value export crops such as vegetables. Egypt exports rice but this can vary periodically based on government regulations, which are influenced by water and land use considerations.

Egypt's Production, Imports and Total Consumption of Wheat and Corn (Maize) (thousand metric tons and fiscal years)
Item	2011	2012	2013	2014	2015	2016	2017	2018	2019	2020	2021	2022
Wheat												
Production	8,400	8,500	8,250	8,300	8,100	8,100	8,450	8,450	8,770	8,900	9,000	9,800
Imports	11,650	8,400	10,150	11,300	11,925	11,181	12,407	12,354	12,811	12,149	12,000	11,000
Total consumption	18,600	18,700	18,500	19,100	19,200	19,400	19,800	20,100	20,300	20,600	20,500	20,600
Maize												
Production	5,500	5,800	5,800	5,960	6,000	6,000	6,400	6,800	6,400	6,400	7,440	7,440
Imports	7,154	5,059	8,791	7,839	8,722	8,773	9,464	9,367	10,432	9,633	9,200	9,200
Total consumption	11,700	12,000	13,200	13,900	14,850	15,100	15,900	16,200	16,900	16,400	16,400	16,400

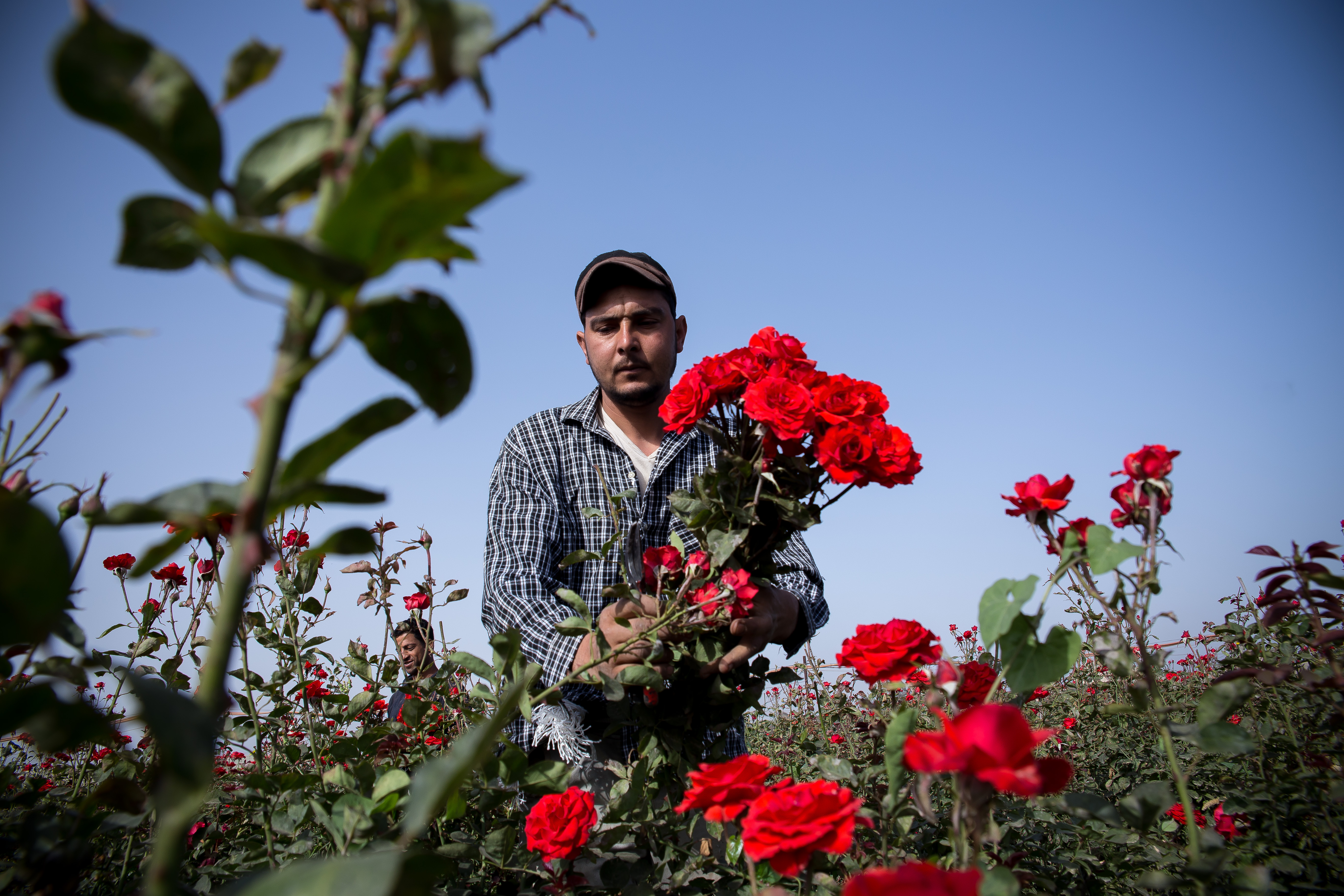
Flower production.

Land is worked intensively and yields are high. Increasingly, modern techniques are applied to producing fruits, vegetables and flowers, in addition to cotton, for export. Further improvement is possible. The most common traditional farms occupy 0.40 hectares (1 acre) each, typically in a canal-irrigated area along the banks of the Nile. Many small farmers also own cows, water buffalos, and chickens. Between 1953 and 1971, some farms were collectivised, especially in Upper Egypt and parts of the Nile Delta.

Cacti, particularly cactus pears, are widely cultivated across Egypt, including Sinai, and extend into neighboring countries. Introduced during the Columbian Exchange, they have become a significant crop in the region.

The government exercises a strong degree of control over agriculture, usually through financial incentives and export bans, not only to ensure the best use of irrigation water but also to confine the planting of water intensive crops like cotton in favor of food grains. However, the government's ability to achieve this objective is limited by crop rotational constraints.

==== Land ownership ====
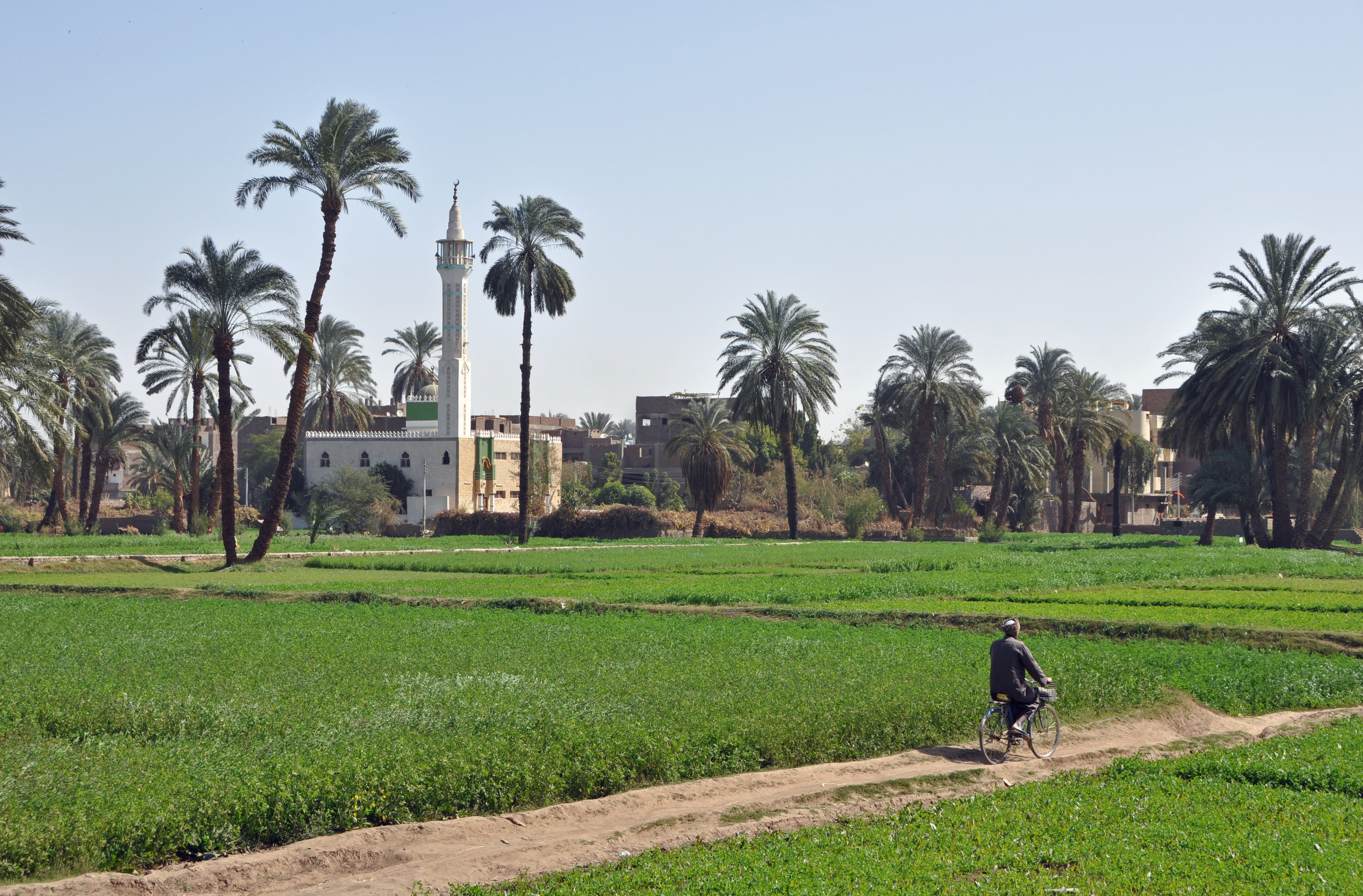
Farmland in the Egyptian countryside

The agrarian reform law of 1952 provided that no one might hold more than 200 feddans, that is, 84 hectares (210 acres) (1 Egyptian feddan=0.42 hectares=1.038 acres), for farming, and that each landholder must either farm the land himself or rent it under specified conditions. Up to 100 additional feddans might be held if the owner had children, and additional land had to be sold to the government. In 1961, the upper limit of landholding was reduced to 100 feddans, and no person was allowed to lease more than 50 feddans. Compensation to the former owners was in bonds bearing a low rate of interest, redeemable within 40 years. A law enacted in 1969 reduced landholdings by one person to 50 feddans.

By the mid-1980s, 90% of all land titles were for holdings of less than five feddans (2.1 hectares (5.2 acres)), and about 300,000 families, or 8% of the rural population, had received land under the agrarian reform program. According to a 1990 agricultural census, there were some three million small land holdings, almost 96% of which were under five feddans. As these small landholdings restricted the ability of farmers to use modern machinery and agricultural techniques that improve and take advantage of economies of scale, there have since the late 1980s been many reforms attempting to deregulate agriculture by liberalizing input and output prices and eliminating crop area controls. As a result, the gap between world and domestic prices for Egyptian agricultural commodities has been closed.

=== Industrial sector ===
==== Chemical products ====
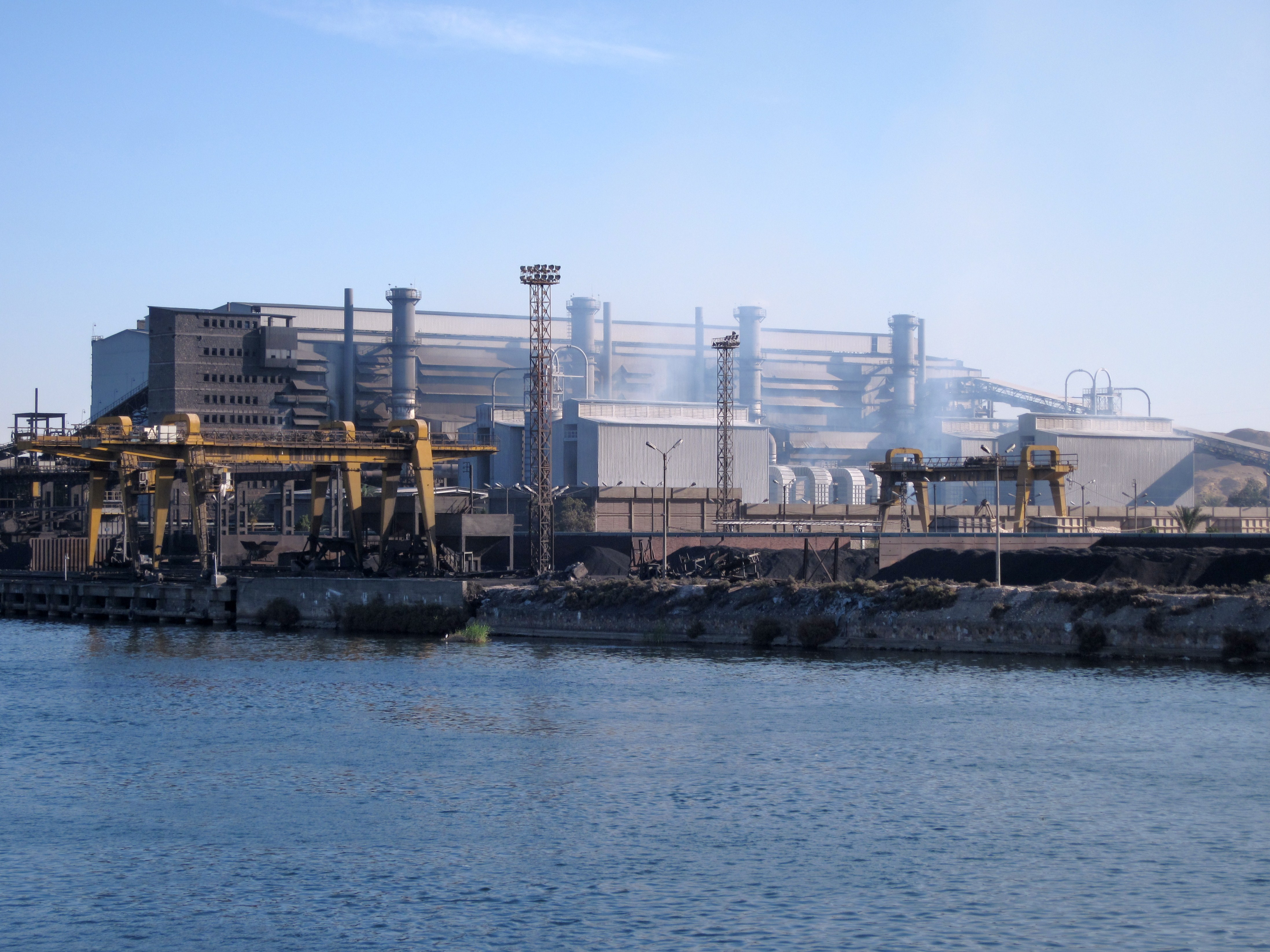
An industrial complex near Edfu.

The chemical industry in Egypt is one of the country's largest, with seven subsectors: plastics, rubber, paper, detergents, paints, miscellaneous chemicals, fertilizers, and glass. The petrochemical segment alone accounts for approximately 12% of Egypt's industrial output. The industry generated $8.4 billion in exports in 2024.

Abu Qir Fertilizers Company is one of Egypt and the MENA region's largest nitrogen fertilizer producers, accounting for nearly 50% of Egypt's nitrogen fertilizer output. Established in 1976, its first ammonia-urea production facility is located in Abu Qir, 20 kilometers east of Alexandria. Egypt Basic Industries Corporation (EBIC) is also a leading ammonia producer in the country.

==== Consumer electronics and home appliances ====
Egypt's consumer electronics and home appliance industry has grown quickly, helped by government programmes and foreign investment. The "Egypt Makes Electronics" initiative, launched in 2015, aims to localize manufacturing, reduce imports, and boost exports.

The program has attracted international companies like Samsung, Hisense, Beko, and Haier, who have established production facilities in Egypt, with some manufacturers already sourcing 70% of components domestically. Electrolux, which entered the Egyptian market by acquiring local Olympic Group, also aims to expand its market share and boost exports, capitalizing on the strong local presence of its brands, particularly Zanussi and Olympic Electric.

The mobile phone segment has also grown, with brands like Vivo, Infinix, Oppo, Xiaomi and Nokia setting up local factories. As of 2025, the country hosts 14 mobile phone manufacturing plants, which together produced 10 million units that year, up from 3.3 million in 2024.

==== Defence and security products ====
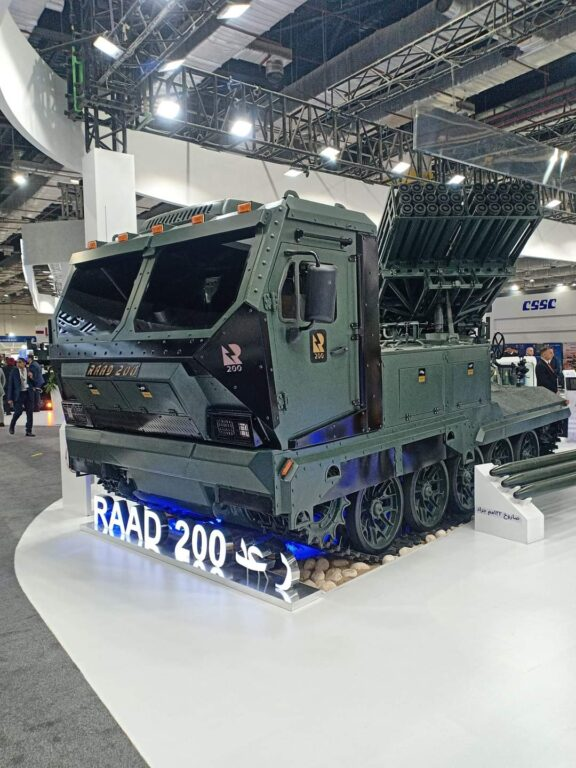
RAAD 200, a multiple rocket launcher produced in Egypt on display at EDEX 2023

Egypt's defence industry is among the oldest and most extensive in the Arab world, comprising a network of state-owned enterprises and a growing private sector. It produces small arms, munitions, drones, armored vehicles, and naval vessels, often through local manufacturing or co-production agreements.

To raise self-sufficiency and exports, Egypt launched a $479 million weapons manufacturing strategy in 2020 to modernize 84 production lines. It has used partnerships and events such as the Egypt Defence Expo to show what it can build and to pitch itself as a regional hub.

The Ministry of Military Production oversees firms such as Abu Zaabal Specialized Industries, Abu Zaabal Engineering Industries, and the Armoured Production and Repair Factory, which produces systems like the M1A1 Abrams, K9A1EGY, RAAD 200, and Sinai 200. It also oversees Thales & Benha Electronics S.A.E., a joint venture with Thales Group for co-producing communications and electronic systems.

The Arab Organization for Industrialization (AOI) oversees companies like Kader, Sakr, and Arab American Vehicles, as well as joint ventures such as Arab British Dynamics. It operates aerospace and engine factories in Helwan, producing the Alpha Jet, K-8E, and pursuing licensed production of the KAI T-50 Golden Eagle. The Alexandria Shipyard builds corvettes, frigates, and patrol vessels, and has partnered with Naval Group and ThyssenKrupp Marine Systems to produce the Gowind 2500 and Meko A200 classes locally.

Private sector players include Robotics Engineering Systems, specializing in drones, smart munitions, and guided missiles, and Amstone, which develops advanced unmanned aerial and naval systems.

==== Gold ====
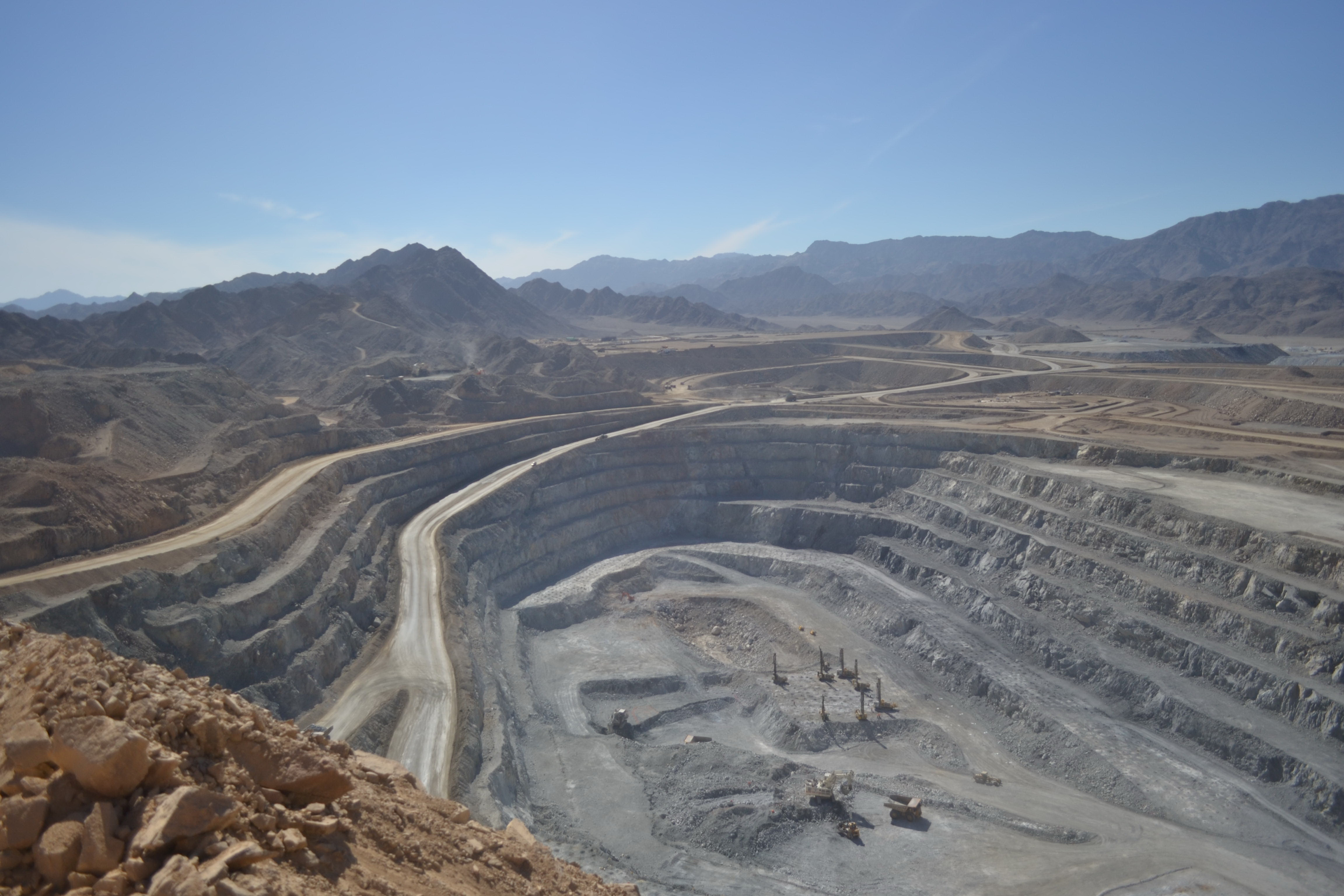
Sukari gold mine

Gold mining in Egypt's Red Sea region has grown fast on the back of untapped reserves. To build a modern mining sector, the government held its first international bid round and awarded mineral concessions to draw investment. That shift in policy opened a state-dominated industry to private companies. Among the early participants were AngloGold Ashanti and Alexander Nubia International, both of which reported encouraging exploration results.

The Sukari mine, located in the Sukari Hills near Marsa Alam, became Egypt's first large-scale modern gold production facility. The government granted a concession to Centamin in 2005, awarding the company an exploitation lease covering 160 square kilometers. Sukari quickly became Egypt's largest gold mine and a turning point in efforts to commercialize the country's gold.

Egypt has launched a modernization drive to raise the mining sector's GDP contribution to 5-6% by 2030. Reforms include transforming the Mineral Resources Authority into an economic entity, removing bureaucratic hurdles, digitizing the sector, and introducing new investment models for gold extraction, all meant to draw investment and bring the rules closer to global standards. Gold exports have since surged to $6.76 billion in the first ten months of 2025, up from $2.63 billion during the same period in 2024. Egypt aims to rank among the world's top 10 gold exporters by 2027.

==== Iron and steel ====
Egypt has been producing iron and steel since 1936, and the industry has been important to its economic development. It has grown through both state-owned and private firms, and is a significant source of industrial output and jobs. As of 2024, Egypt is Africa’s leading steel producer, third largest in the Middle East and 19th globally, with an output of 10.7 million metric tons of crude steel produced in 2024.

EZDK is the largest steel company in Egypt and the Middle East, today part of Ezz Industries. It owns four steel plants in Alexandria, Sadat, Suez and 10th of Ramadan. It was ranked 77th on the list of the world's largest steel companies by the World Steel Association in 2020, with a production of 4.57 million tons.

In 2023 exports of reinforced steel surged more than threefold, reaching 1.54 million tons compared to 523,000 tons in the previous year. At the same time, crude steel production grew by 6% to 10.4 million tons, supported by increased exports, particularly in hot-rolled coil.

==== Motor vehicles ====
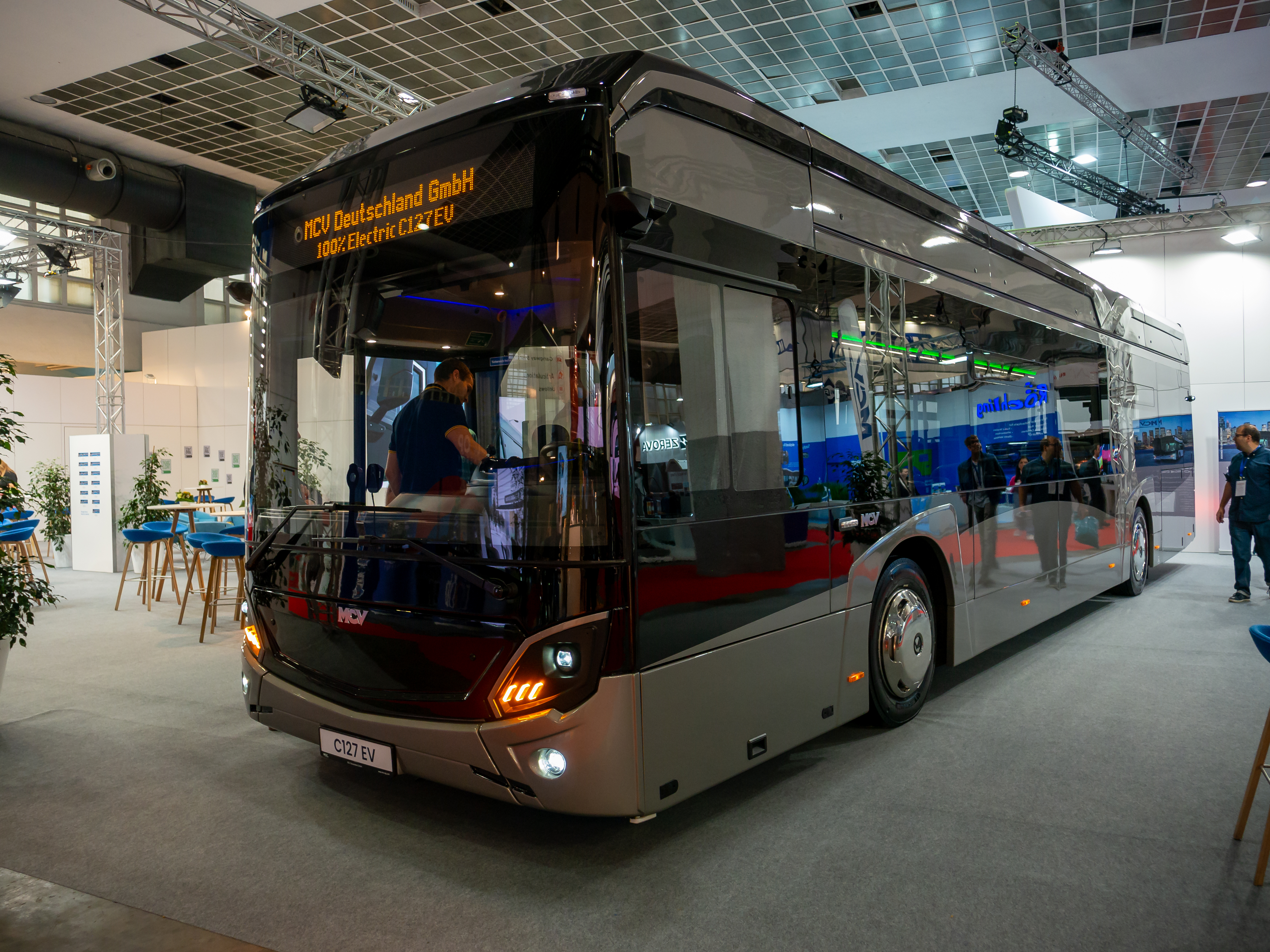
The fully electric MCV C127 EV, made in Egypt for the German market

The Egyptian automotive industry dates back to 1960 when the state-owned Nasr was established in Helwan. The company began operations in 1962, producing vehicles under license from brands such as Zastava Automobili, Mercedes-Benz Group, Kia, and Peugeot. After a 15-year hiatus the company resumed production in 2024, beginning with electric buses in partnership with China's Yutong. It markets three bus models under its own brand: Nasr Green, Nasr Sky, and Nasr Star.

Egypt's 2024–2030 automotive strategy aims to boost annual production to 400,000–500,000 vehicles, with 25% for export, targeting $4 billion in revenue. As part of the program the government has encouraged joint ventures between local firms and international partners.

Ezz Elarab Group and El Sewedy Electric have partnered with Indonesia's Proton Holdings, and Chinese automaker Exceed has begun assembly of vehicles locally in 6th of October together with Egyptian-German Automotive. In 2025, Jetour, in partnership with El Kasrawy Group, committed $123 million to establish an assembly facility in the same city, and Mansour Group began construction on the MAC Automotive plant, a $150 million facility in 6th of October with a planned capacity of 100,000 vehicles.

As of 2025, Egypt hosts 83 car manufacturers, including major companies such as General Motors, BMW, Hyundai, Toyota, and Nissan. The country has more than 15 car assembly plants and 75 related facilities, providing over 75,000 jobs. Egypt's total installed production capacity is estimated at 300,000 vehicles per year. The country's vehicle production for 2025 was around 95,000 units, up from 37,000 in 2023. Exports of car and auto components reached $891 million in the first 9 months of 2025 and are projected to exceed $1 billion by year-end.

==== Personal care and pharmaceutical products ====
Established in 1939 with the founding of the Misr Company for Pharmaceutical Industries, Egypt's pharmaceutical sector is one of the nation's oldest strategic industries. Over the past two decades, the market has expanded fivefold. Today the country has the largest pharmaceutical market in Africa, accounting for 27% of the continent's total. In 2024 it became the first African country to achieve World Health Organization Maturity Level 3 for the regulation of medicines and vaccines.

The number of pharmaceutical factories increased from 130 in 2015 to 179 in 2025. Similarly, production lines grew from 500 in 2015 to 986 in 2025. Egypt went from being the world's 47th largest pharmaceutical producer in 2015 to 29th in 2023. It produced approximately 91% of the medicines consumed domestically in 2025 and exported pharmaceuticals worth $447 million in 2024. However, the domestic pharmaceutical industry remains highly dependent on imported inputs, with around 90% of raw materials sourced from abroad.

The Egyptian beauty and personal care market has grown fast, partly because repeated currency devaluations pushed consumers toward locally made goods. In 2025, the sector is expected to generate $7.6 billion in revenue.

==== Textiles and clothing ====
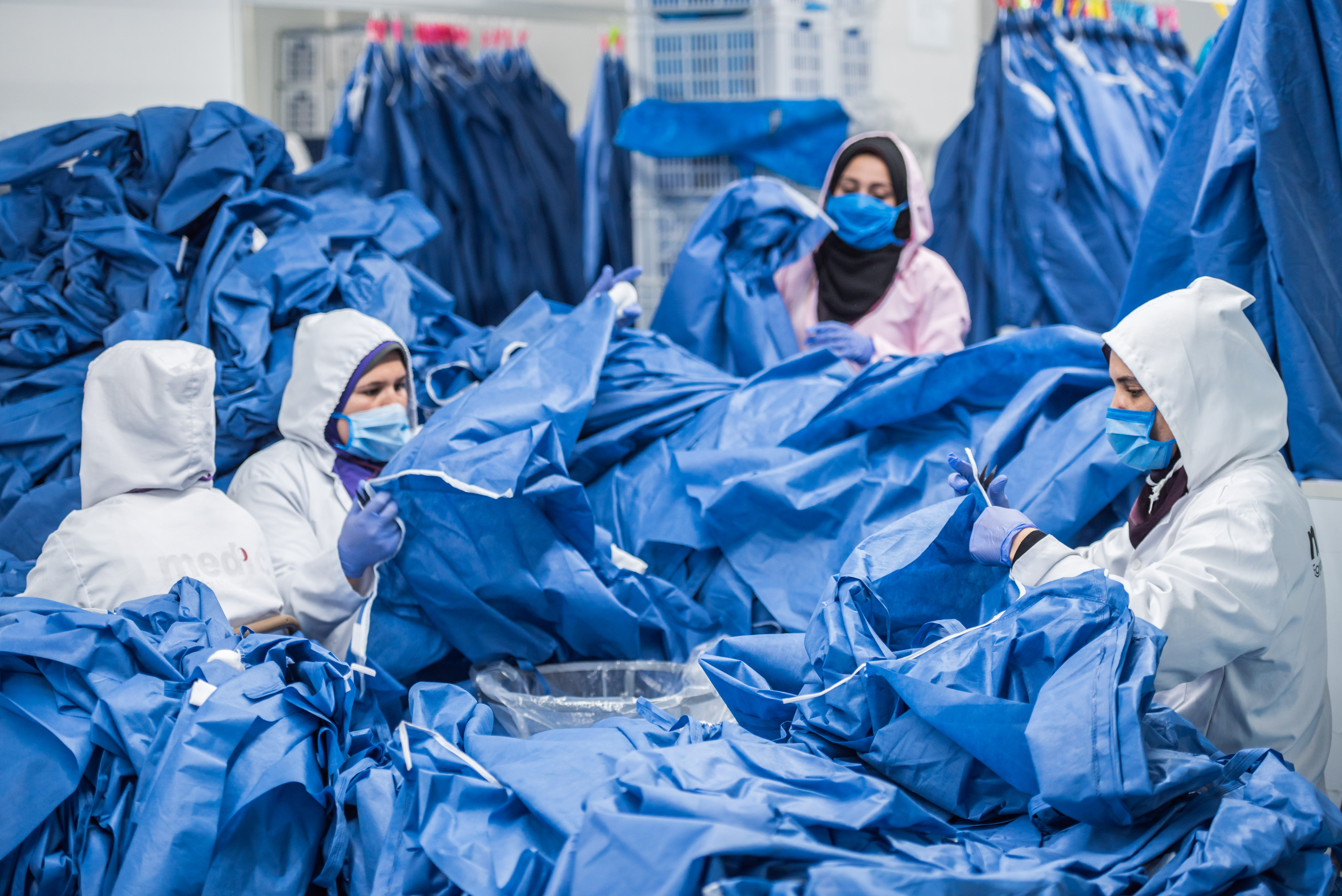
Egyptian women working at a factory making medical clothes

Textiles are one of the larger parts of Egypt's economy, accounting for approximately 12% of the country's export earnings as of 2023. It employs around 2.5 million people and includes one of the largest and most productive cotton and textile clusters in Africa. The entire production process, from cotton cultivation to finished garments, occurs domestically, with cotton comprising roughly 75% of natural fibre use. Egypt is internationally known for its extra-long staple cotton varieties, particularly Giza cotton, derived from Gossypium barbadense.

Between 2014 and 2021, 6,740 textile companies were established. Over 450 of these were established between 2016 and 2019 with foreign investment. The public sector accounts for 50% of spinning, 60% of knitting, and 60% of weaving, while the private sector dominates garment manufacturing with a 90% share.

Mahalla El Kobra serves as the center of Egypt's textile production and is home to the state-owned Misr Spinning and Weaving Company, which owns one of the largest spinning and weaving factories in the world. The sector includes approximately 6,500 textile-only factories among 85,000 establishments. Major export destinations include the European Union, Asia, the Middle East, and Africa, with products such as denim, cotton yarns, and non-woven fabrics.

=== Energy sector ===
==== Electricity ====
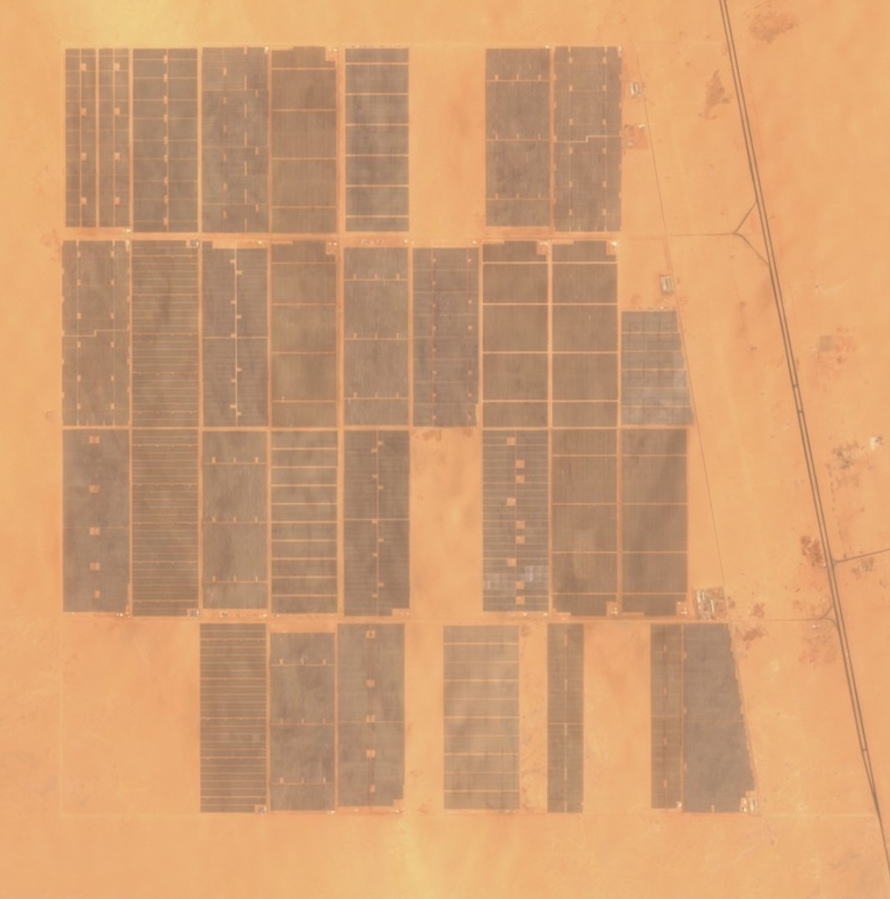
Benban Solar Park

Egypt suffered blackouts during the summer of 2014 that lasted for up to six hours per day. A rapid series of reforms cut energy subsidies, and Egypt quickly developed the Zohr gas field in the Mediterranean, which was discovered in 2015. The country now has an oversupply of electricity and aims to source 20% of its electricity from renewables by 2022 and 55% by 2050.

As part of its renewable energy strategy, Egypt has undertaken large-scale projects like the Benban Solar Park and the Gabal El Zeit wind farm. Benban, located near Aswan, has a total capacity of 1650 MW and generates about 3.8 TWh annually, making it the fourth-largest solar power plant globally. Additionally, the Gabal El Zeit wind farm, costing €340 million, spans 100 square kilometers with 300 turbines, generating 580 MW of electricity.

Egypt and Cyprus are considering implementing the proposed EuroAfrica Interconnector project. This consists of laying a 2 GW HVDC undersea power cable between them and between Cyprus and Greece, thus connecting Egypt to the greater European power grid. The interconnector will make Egypt an electricity hub between Europe and Africa. The president of Egypt and the prime minister of Cyprus met in Nicosia on 21 November 2017 and showed their full support for the EuroAfrica Interconnector pointing out its importance for energy security of the three countries.

==== Nuclear ====
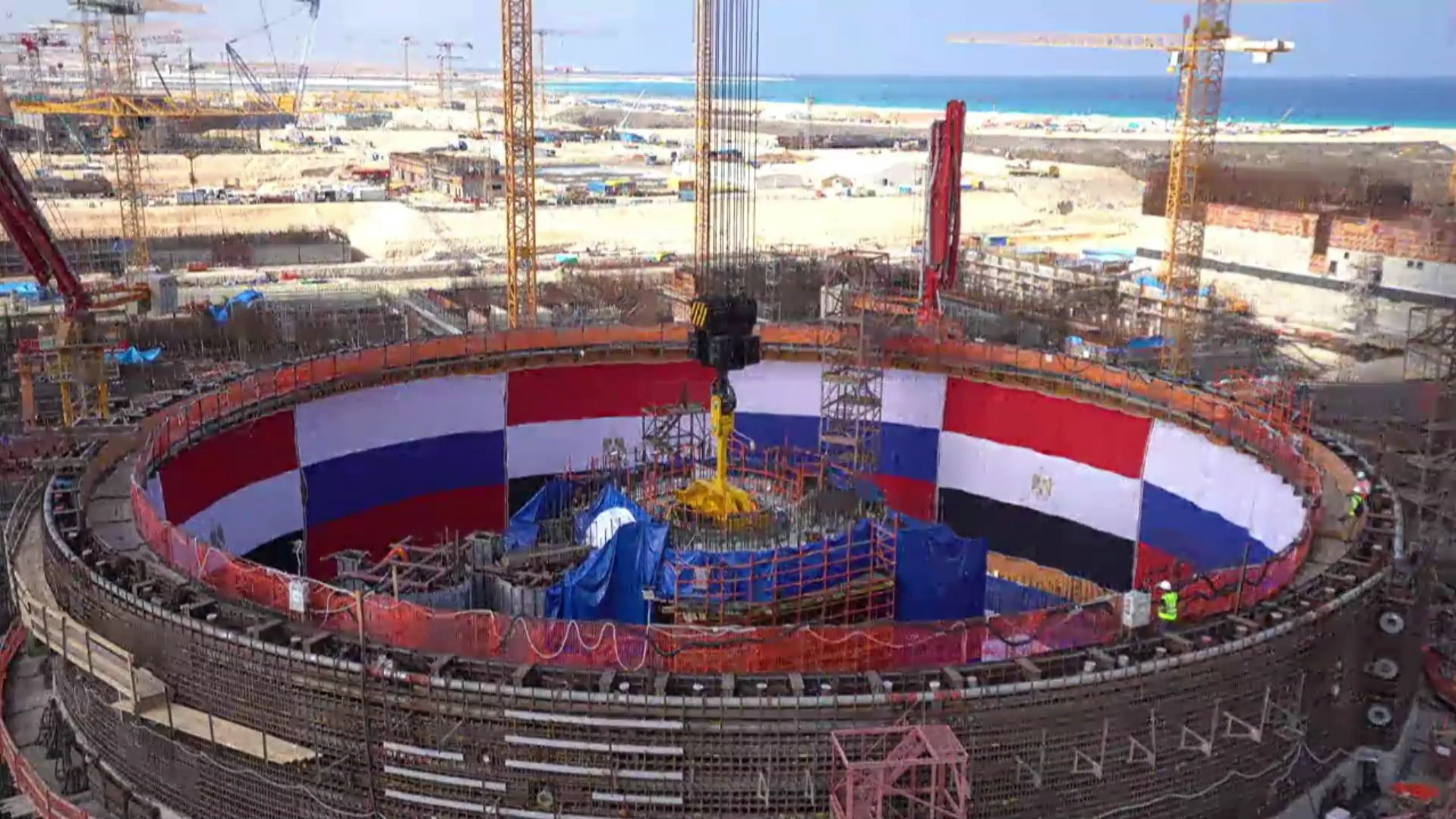
Construction of a reactor unit at the El Dabaa Nuclear Power Plant.

On 29 October 2007, Egypt's president, Hosni Mubarak gave the go-ahead for building several nuclear power plants, but this failed to take off under his leadership. On November 19, 2015, Egypt and Russia signed an initial agreement, under which Russia will build and finance Egypt's first nuclear power plant. In December 2017 preliminary contracts for the construction of four VVER-1200 units were signed in the presence of Egyptian President Abdel Fattah el-Sisi and Russian President Vladimir Putin. The permit for unit 1 was issued by the Egyptian Nuclear and Radiological Regulatory Authority (ENRRA) in June 2022. First safety-related concrete was poured in July 2022. In October 2022, ENRRA gave construction approval for unit 2, whose construction started on 19 November.

==== Hydrocarbons ====
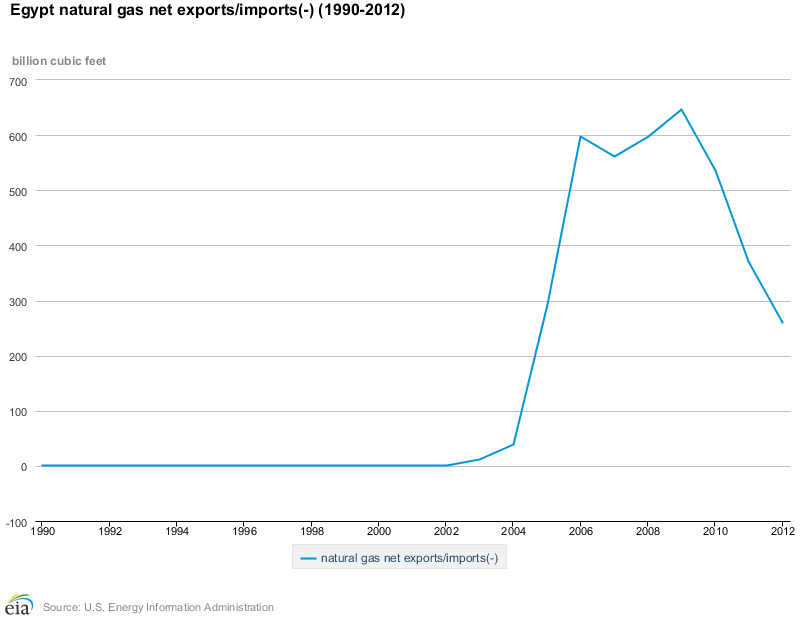
Egypt's net natural gas exports.

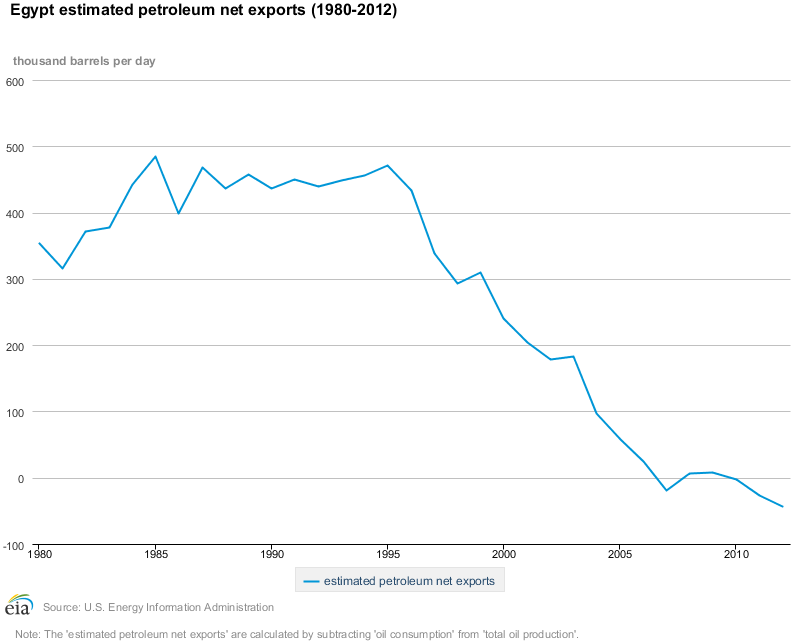
Egypt's oil consumption is overtaking oil production.

The Egyptian government has long prioritized expanding the petrochemical industry and increasing natural gas exports. By 2009, 38% of locally produced natural gas was allocated for export. However, declining crude oil production, peaking at 941,000 bbl/d (149,600 m^{3}/d) in 1993 before falling to 630,000 bbl/d (100,000 m^{3}/d) by 2008, led Egypt to shift focus toward natural gas. By 2008, gas production had reached 48.3 billion cubic meters, though rising domestic consumption turned Egypt into a net oil importer by 2008–2009.

In 2014, Egypt prioritized domestic gas consumption over exports, sharply reducing international supply. The country also signed a 15-year agreement with Israel to import 7 billion cubic meters of gas annually from the Leviathan field. A year later, BP announced a $12 billion investment in Egypt's natural gas sector, primarily in the West Nile Delta project, which now produces nearly 1 billion cubic feet per day (bcf/d). BP also developed the Atoll field (300 million standard cubic feet per day) and the North Damietta concession, with production from the Qattameya discovery starting in 2020.

The Zohr gas field, discovered by Eni in 2015, remains the Mediterranean's largest natural gas find, with estimated reserves of 30 trillion cubic feet. Production began in December 2017, reaching 2.7 bcf/d by August 2019. However, recent technical challenges have reduced Zohr's output, leading to domestic supply constraints and increased reliance on imports. Egypt has secured agreements with Cyprus to import gas from the Cronos and Aphrodite fields, processing it in Idku and Damietta for LNG exports to Europe. Efforts to revitalize Zohr include new drilling plans to increase production by 220 million cubic feet per day.

=== Construction sector ===
Egypt's construction industry is valued at $55 billion, as of 2025, and contributes around 14% to GDP. The sector benefits from state-led infrastructure investment and growing foreign interest, particularly from Gulf sovereign funds. Real estate remains a key driver, with $20 billion invested in Cairo in 2022, largely in housing. The introduction of real estate trading on the Egyptian Exchange and the launch of a dedicated real estate fund have further diversified the market.

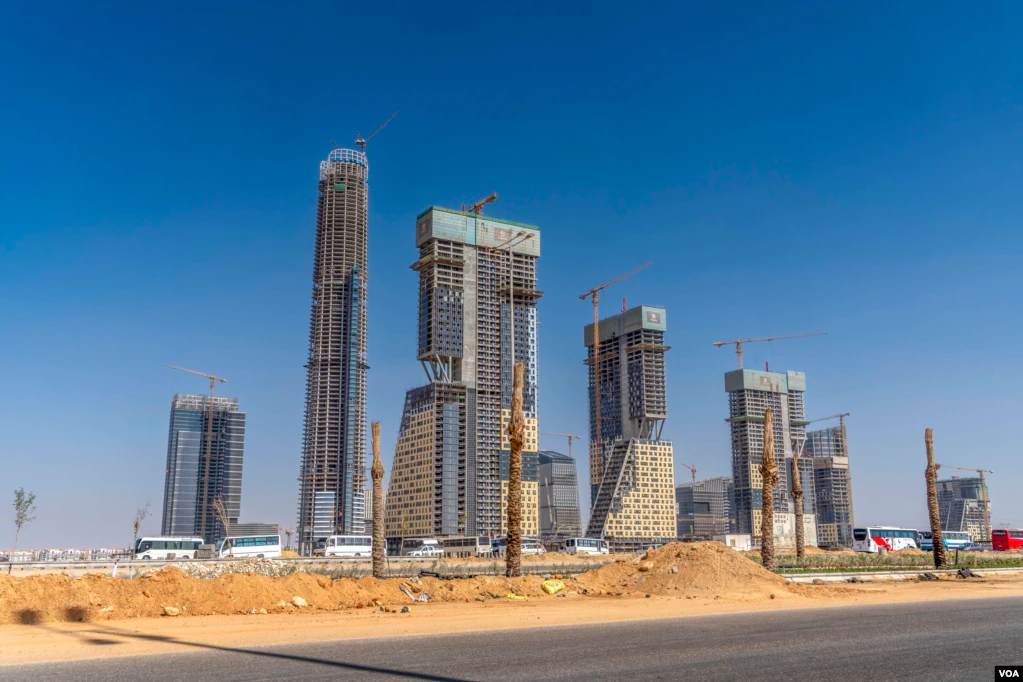
Construction of the central business district in Egypt's new capital in 2021

Flagship projects include the new capital of Egypt, launched in 2015, and New Alamein, a north coast city spanning 48,000 feddans, both part of Egypt's fourth-generation cities. Other major projects such as the Cairo Metro Lines 3 and 4, the two-line Cairo Monorail, and the high-speed rail network are reshaping national infrastructure, alongside large-scale energy projects like the El Dabaa Nuclear Power Plant.

Residential construction leads the market with a 37% share in 2024, supported by a young population and pro-housing policies. Industrial construction, meanwhile, is the fastest-growing segment, expected to grow 12% annually through 2029, driven by foreign investment and specialized industrial zones.

Leading firms include Hassan Allam Construction, Dorra Holding, Arab Contractors, Orascom Construction, and SIAC Industrial Construction & Engineering.

=== Services sector ===
==== Banking ====
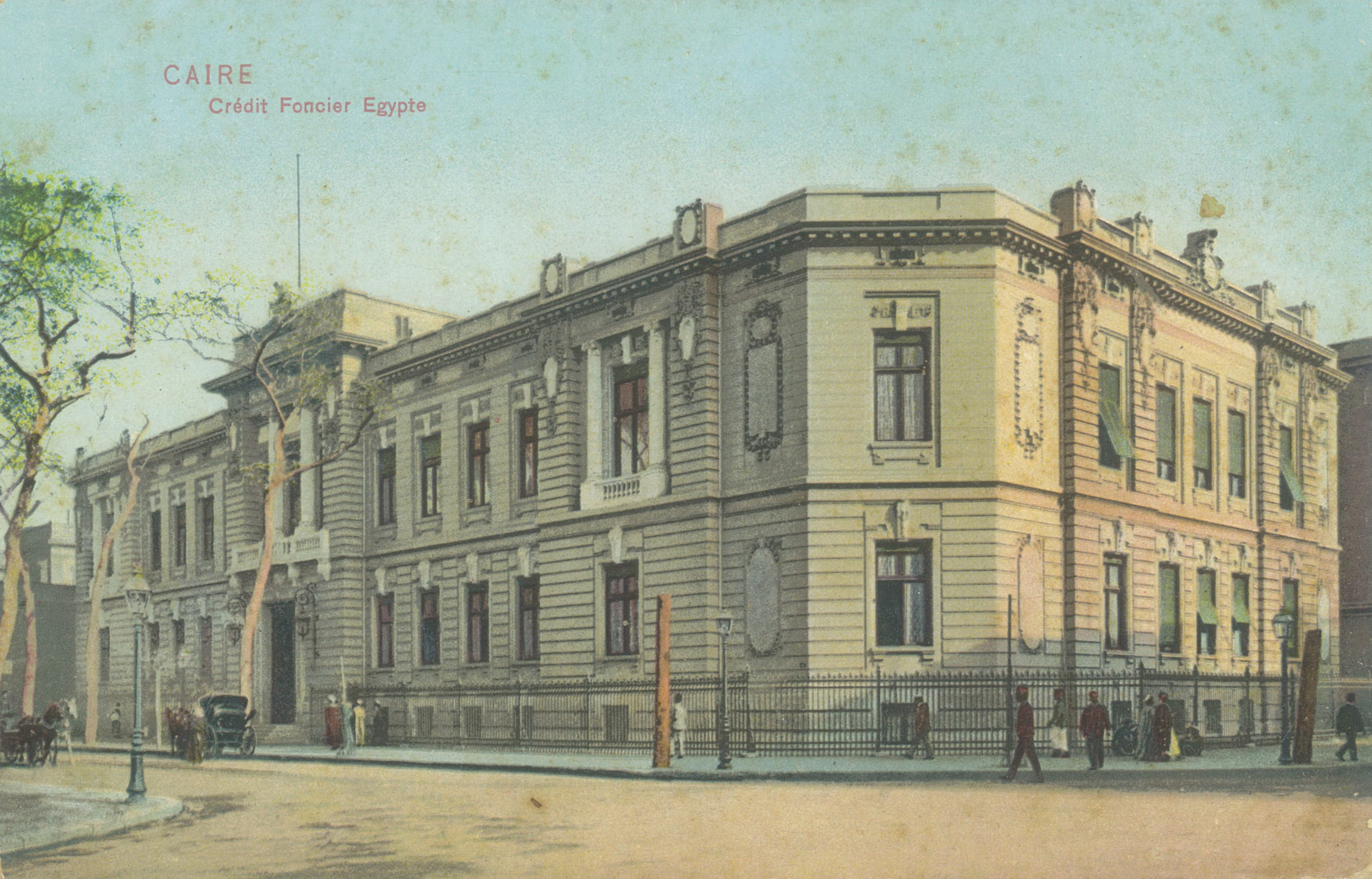
A postcard depicting the building of the Crédit Foncier Égyptien, the oldest bank in Cairo, founded in 1880.

The Central Bank of Egypt is the national reserve bank, regulating the financial market and the Egyptian pound. Egypt's banking sector has undergone major reforms since the 1990s, producing a more liberalized system closer to international standards. By late 2024, total bank assets reached approximately 21 trillion Egyptian pounds (US$420 billion), a significant rise from EGP 633 billion (US$101 billion) in 2004.

Egypt's banking system dates back to 1856, evolving through privatization, mergers, and foreign bank exits, such as Société Générale's 2012 sale of National Société Générale Bank to QNB Al Ahli. Despite private sector growth, state-owned commercial banks remain dominant.

Financial inclusion has expanded, with 74.8% of Egyptians aged 15 and above using financial accounts, reaching 52 million users by 2024. Usage spans banks, Egypt Post, mobile wallets like Vodafone Cash and MobiCash, and prepaid cards like Meeza. Women's financial inclusion grew 295% since 2016 after policies aimed at bringing women into the financial system, reaching 68.8%, while youth participation rose 65% from 2020 to 2024, hitting 53.1%.

The fintech sector has expanded 5.5-fold since 2020, with 177 startups ranking Egypt 10th among emerging markets. Growth, driven by digital payments, lending platforms, and B2B marketplaces, is supported by financial inclusion policies. With over 60% of the population under 30, youth adoption is high, though cybersecurity risks, regulatory gaps, and uneven digital literacy remain problems.

==== Finance ====
The origins of Egypt's stock exchange date back to 1883 with the establishment of the first futures market in Alexandria. In 1902, the Brokers' Syndicate was formed, introducing the first set of regulations governing stock market activities.

Today, the Egyptian Exchange (EGX) comprises the Cairo and Alexandria stock exchanges, operating under a unified trading, clearing, and settlement system. It serves as the primary platform for equities, bonds, and financial instruments in Egypt. The exchange has undergone multiple phases of reform, including privatizations, regulatory changes, and structural changes meant to improve liquidity and attract foreign investment.

Egypt's stock market has swung with global economic conditions, foreign capital flows, and domestic policy. Periods of IPO activity and privatization efforts have contributed to market expansion, while global downturns and geopolitical shocks have periodically hurt performance. Government-led reforms have included revisions to listing rules, the introduction of sectoral indices, and measures to increase market depth, such as the establishment of a treasury bonds index and approval for special purpose acquisition companies. Plans for further market development include the launch of EGYCOMEX, the Egyptian Commodities Exchange, and the introduction of derivatives trading, both meant to widen the range of instruments and build up Egypt's role as a regional financial center.

==== ICT and communications ====
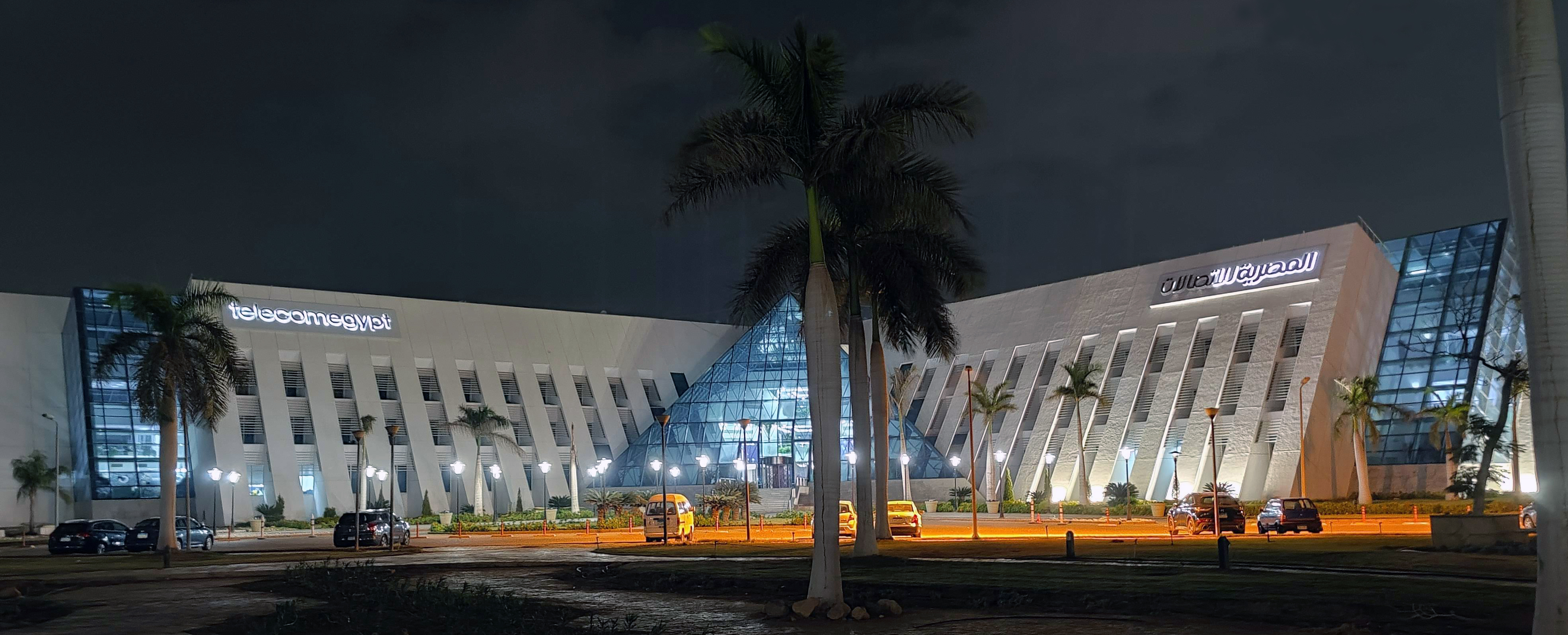
The headquarter of Telecom Egypt

The liberalization of Egypt's telecommunications sector began in 1998, gradually expanding private sector involvement in mobile telephony and internet services. In 2004, the Information Technology Industry Development Agency (ITIDA) was established under Law 15 to drive Egypt's digital transformation, implement e-signature legislation, and promote an export-oriented IT sector. Deregulation followed in 2006 after Egypt joined the World Trade Organization's Information Technology Agreement in 2003, opening the market to competition and foreign investment. By 2007, Egypt had 10 million fixed lines, 31 million mobile subscribers, and 8.1 million internet users.

The ICT sector has since become a major driver of economic growth, expanding by 15.2% in FY 2022/2023 and contributing 5.1% to Egypt's GDP, up from 4.4% in 2019/2020. Investments in the sector reached $4.2 billion in 2022/2023, a 20% increase from the previous year. The telecommunications market operates under a unified license system, with key players including Telecom Egypt, Vodafone, Orange, Etisalat Egypt, and Ericsson.

Egypt's ICT market is projected to grow from $23.6 billion in 2025 to $53.1 billion by 2030, at a compound annual growth rate of 17.61%. The government's Digital Egypt initiative aims to make the country a digital society by expanding infrastructure, backing innovation, and modernizing public services. As part of this strategy, and the broader Egypt Vision 2030, the government has integrated 33,000 institutions into a secured digital network and expanded online services to improve transparency and efficiency.

Between 2019 and 2022, mobile internet subscriptions surged by 77.9%, from 39 million to 69.4 million, with total mobile subscriptions reaching 106.2 million by December 2023. Internet penetration reached 72.2% in early 2024, with 82 million users. Egypt leads Africa in internet speed rankings.

==== Transport ====
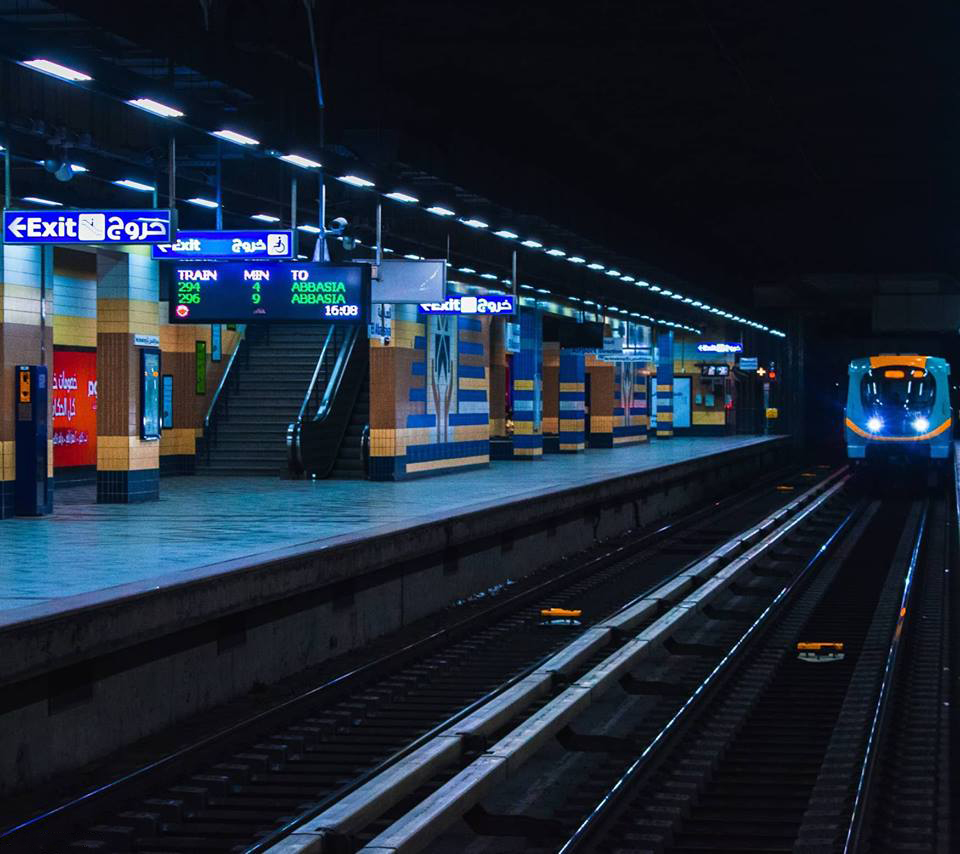
The Cairo Metro.

Transport in Egypt centers on Cairo and follows settlement along the Nile. The Nile River (1,600 km (990 mi)) and major canals of equal length serve local transport.

Since 2014, the National Roads Project has driven major upgrades to Egypt's road network, adding 6,300 km of new roads and upgrading 8,400 km at a combined cost of 265 billion Egyptian pounds. This expanded main roads by 29.8% to 30,500 km and improved Egypt's ranking in the Road Quality Index from 118th globally in 2015 to 18th in 2024.

Egypt's 4,800 kilometres (3,000 mi) railway network is operated by Egyptian National Railways. In 2021, the National Authority for Tunnels signed a $4.5 billion contract with Siemens Mobility, Orascom Construction, and Arab Contractors to build a 660 km (410 mi) electrified high-speed rail line linking Ain Sokhna, Mersa Matruh, and Alexandria. Dubbed the "Green Line" or "Suez Canal on rails," it will carry both freight and passengers using Velaro high-speed trains, Desiro regional sets, and Vectron freight locomotives. Two more lines were announced in 2022, connecting Greater Cairo to Aswan and Luxor to Hurghada and Safaga.

Egypt Air and private carriers such as Nile Air and Air Cairo operate frequent domestic flights from Cairo International Airport to major tourist destinations.

The Suez Canal, managed by the Suez Canal Authority, is a major global shipping route linking the Mediterranean and Red Seas. Egypt's main ports include Alexandria, Port Said, and Damietta on the Mediterranean, and Suez, Ain Sokhna, and Safaga on the Red Sea.

==== Tourism ====
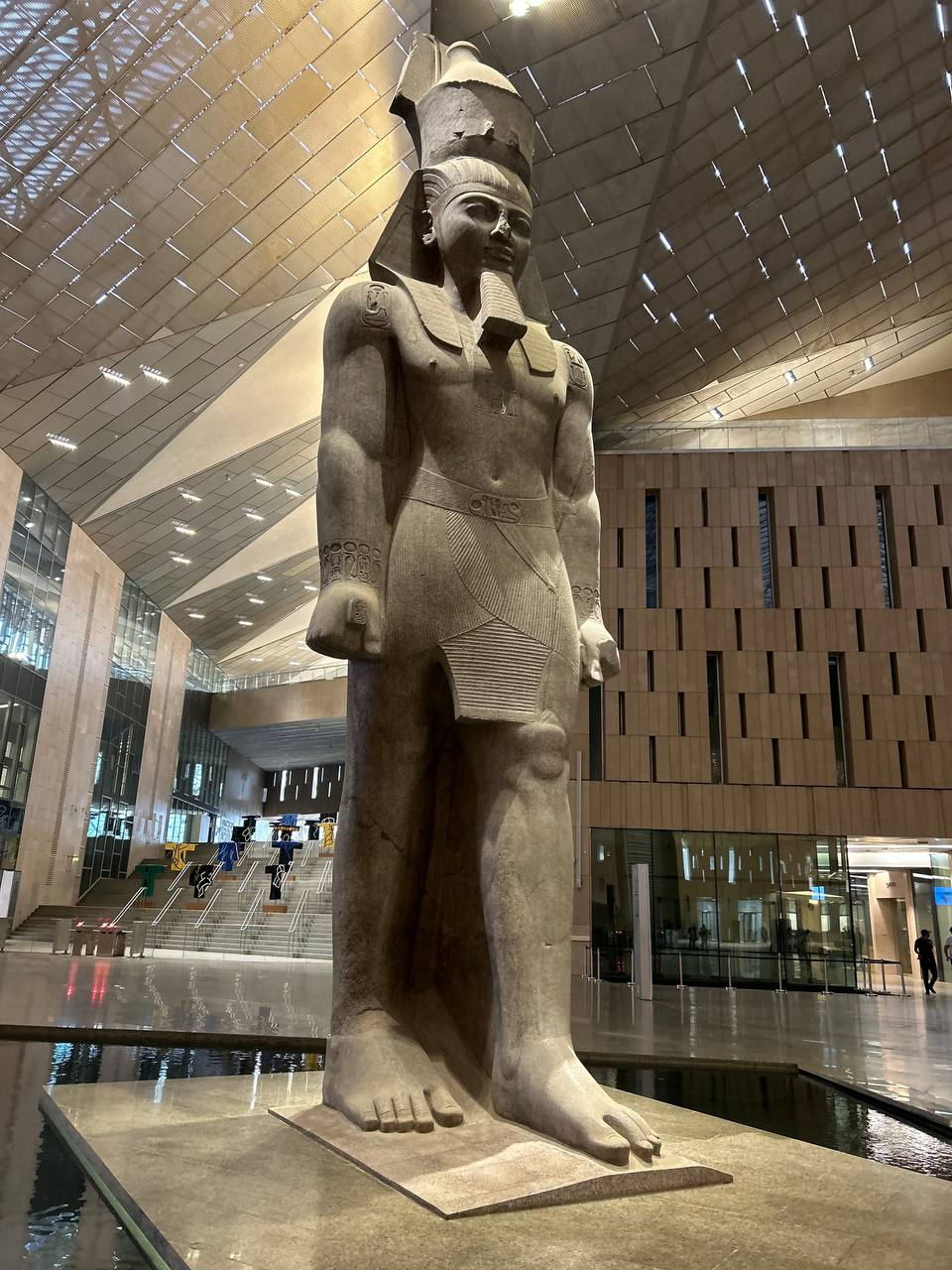
Grand Egyptian Museum

Tourism in Egypt grew quickly after 1975 when the government eased visa restrictions and focused on tourism infrastructure. By 1981, tourist arrivals had risen to 1.8 million, reaching 14.7 million in 2010. However, the COVID-19 pandemic caused a sharp decline, with revenues dropping to $4 billion in 2020 and arrivals falling to 3.5 million. In February 2022, the International Monetary Fund (IMF) noted that Egypt's tourism sector was the biggest loser from the pandemic.

Egypt's government has initiated several projects in the tourism sector, including the Grand Egyptian Museum. It is the world's largest museum for a single civilization and was built to display Egypt's archaeological heritage and draw visitors.

Egypt recorded around 19 million tourist arrivals in 2025, up 21% from 15.7 million in 2024, following 14.9 million visitors in 2023. Revenues also reached a record $14.1 billion in 2024. The country's tourism strategy includes plans to attract 30 million tourists by 2028, with continued improvements to infrastructure and the tourist experience.

=== Emerging sectors ===
==== Science and technology ====
Egypt's science and technology sector is centred on research, university–industry collaboration and startup development. In the 2024 Global Innovation Index, Egypt ranked 54th out of 132 countries on the Research and Development sub-index and 53rd in university-industry R&D collaboration. Egypt has become Africa's leading country in R&D, increasing its spending more than twelve-fold between 2000 and 2023. Its share of global R&D rose from 0.1% to 0.6%. Egypt also leads the continent in R&D intensity, investing 1.02% of GDP.

Despite a long academic tradition and improvements in overall innovation rankings since 2022, domestic industries continue to rely heavily on imported technologies rather than locally developed research. A number of programmes aim to bridge the gap between academic research and the market. The Researchers to Entrepreneurs (R2E) programme, run by the Innovators Support Fund under the Ministry of Higher Education and Scientific Research, provides university researchers with training and support to assess the commercial potential of their research and launch startups or marketable products.

Cairo has emerged as a leading tech startup hub in the MENA region, ranking third in the 2024 Global Startup Ecosystem Report. Growth comes from a young population increasingly interested in STEM subjects, better access to mentorship and incubators, and major events like the RiseUp Summit and Techne Summit. Venture capital funding reached $491 million in 2021 and with over 280 startups funded since 2010, Egypt is the largest startup hub in the region, supported by initiatives such as the Technology Innovation and Entrepreneurship Centre, CREATIVA Innovation Hubs, Egypt Ventures, and programs from the Central Bank of Egypt. Fintech and e-commerce are among the most active fields, with significant growth in healthtech, biotech, and medtech as well.

The deep technology sector in Egypt reached a market size of $518.2 million in 2022, growing 20.2% from $431.1 million in 2021. The sector is expected to reach an estimated $3.8 billion by 2032, with robotics being the fastest-growing segment. Adoption of deep-tech solutions by small and medium-sized enterprises and the healthcare sector is also forecast to increase over the next decade. In the broader Middle East, 31 companies invested $32.5 million in deep technology in the first nine months of 2021, one-third of them being Egyptian.

===== Semiconductors and electronic chips =====
In 2024, Egypt launched a national policy to localize semiconductor and electronic chip manufacturing, identifying the sector as a strategic priority for economic growth and technological self-reliance. The initiative provides incentives such as tax breaks, land access, and technical support to promote investment in semiconductors, embedded systems, and circuit design. It forms part of the broader Egypt Makes Electronics program, a presidential strategy launched in 2015 to advance high-value electronics design and manufacturing and generate employment in labor-intensive production.

In 2024 Egypt partnered with China's Tsinghua Unigroup to launch a $300 million investment fund focused on semiconductors and artificial intelligence, with over 80% of the capital contributed by the Chinese side in collaboration with Egyptian partners.

As of 2025, Egypt hosts 23 semiconductor startups, with several notable companies emerging in the sector. These include Si-Ware Systems, which specializes in ASICs and MEMS; Avelabs, focused on embedded software for the automotive industry; SilMinds, a developer of hardware acceleration solutions for high-performance computing; Wasiela, which designs communication IP cores and digital media systems; and NeoSpectra, known for MEMS-based spectral sensors. InfiniLink, an Egyptian semiconductor startup founded in 2023, secured $10 million in seed funding in 2025, one of the largest deep-tech seed rounds in the MENA region. The company specializes in next-generation, energy-efficient optical transceiver chiplets designed for telecom, AI data centers, and IoT infrastructure.

== Largest listed companies ==
In 2024, one Egyptian company was listed in the Forbes Global 2000 list, an annual ranking of the top 2000 public companies in the world by Forbes magazine.

World rank	Company	Industry	Revenue (billion $)	Profits (billion $)	Assets (billion $)	Market value (billion $)
1663	Commercial International Bank	Banking	4.67	0.967	20.61	4.83

Forbes Middle East also published a separate 2024 ranking of the top 50 listed companies in Egypt, covering large listed firms that did not make the global list. Following Commercial International Bank in the local ranking were QNB Al Ahli and Elsewedy Electric, each with a market capitalization of $1.4 billion. They were followed by Telecom Egypt (4th), Orascom Construction (5th), and Talaat Mostafa Group (6th). Rounding out the top ten were Egypt Kuwait Holding, Faisal Islamic Bank of Egypt, Abu Qir Fertilizers, and Misr Fertilizers Production Company.

The banking and financial services sector dominated with 16 entries, contributing $8.4 billion in sales and holding $58.5 billion in assets. The real estate and construction sector followed with nine firms, and the industrial sector accounted for seven.

== Investment climate ==
Historically, private equity has played a limited role in business financing in Egypt. The government has taken several steps to improve the investment climate and attract foreign direct investment (FDI). The Investment Law of 2017 was introduced to streamline procedures and investor incentives, and was followed by a new company law and bankruptcy law in 2018 and a customs law in 2020, all meant to make doing business easier. Simpler company registration and greater openness to foreign participation helped make Egypt one of Africa's leading FDI destinations between 2016 and 2020. A citizenship-by-investment program was also introduced, offering residency and citizenship in exchange for financial contributions.

Egypt has also cut corporate tax rates and trade tariffs to draw investment and lift growth. As part of the reforms, Egypt introduced "golden licenses", a single-approval mechanism that allows investors to acquire land and begin operations without requiring multiple approvals from various government bodies. The General Authority for Investment and Free Zones (GAFI) oversees the program, which aims to reduce bureaucracy and attract FDI. As of March 2024, 26 golden licenses had been granted. In July 2023, President El-Sisi ratified Law No. 159 of 2023, which eliminated exemptions for state-owned enterprises, ensuring equal regulatory treatment for all investors.

Large infrastructure projects, including transport modernization, new urban communities, and the Suez Canal's expansion, are meant to cut logistics costs, speed up trade, and give investors better facilities.

However, corruption and weak enforcement of regulation still weigh on investor confidence. In 2024, Egypt scored 30 out of 100 on Transparency International's Corruption Perceptions Index, ranking 130th out of 180 countries.

== Regional data ==
Data shown are for the year 2021 in nominal numbers.

Governorate	GDP (billion EGP)	GDP (billion US$)
Cairo	1,876.650	119.543
Giza	770.071	49.054
Alexandria	565.876	36.046
Qalyubiyya	339.316	21.614
Sharqia	302.065	19.242
Dakahlia	294.016	18.729
Beheira	288.857	18.400
Port Said	190.154	12.113
Gharbia	173.763	11.069
Monufia	157.267	10.018
Kafr El Sheikh	151.053	9.622
Faiyum	133.504	8.504
Minya	130.976	8.343
Asyut	126.143	8.035
Suez	119.129	7.589
Matrouh	115.552	7.361
Damietta	110.340	7.029
Sohag	107.757	6.864
Ismailia	91.127	5.805
Beni Suef	87.194	5.554
Qena	80.395	5.121
Aswan	76.265	4.858
Red Sea	75.872	4.833
South Sinai	58.386	3.719
North Sinai	48.932	3.117
Luxor	46.634	2.971
New Valley	16.963	1.081
Egypt	6,627.028	422.142

== Challenges ==
=== Poverty ===
Street vendors in Cairo.

Egypt has struggled to implement effective policies to address poverty. Past efforts to alleviate economic burdens often benefited wealthier segments of society. For example, food, electricity, and petroleum subsidies have historically disproportionately aided the non-poor.

Egypt's fertility rate has dropped from 6.6 children per woman in the 1960s to 3.2 children per woman in 2021, though it is still high by global standards. The population increased from 44 million in 1981 to over 106 million today. Overpopulation remains one of the biggest challenges to confronting poverty. The country's reliance on international loans, such as from the IMF, has sometimes resulted in increased hardship for the population. In August 2022, Egypt sought another loan amid rising prices, triggering criticism of economic policies that primarily benefited elites.

The poverty rate in Egypt increased from 19 percent in 2005 to 21 percent in 2009, as reported by then Minister of Economic Development, Othman Mohamed Othman. The national poverty rate stood at 24.3% in 2010, rising to approximately 30% by 2015. Additionally, a 2019 World Bank report indicated that 60% of Egypt's population was either poor or vulnerable.

As of 2020, Egypt's population stood at 102 million, with 33% under the age of 14. Approximately 30% of the population lived below the poverty line. By 2021, this figure had declined slightly to 29.7% of the population.

=== Role of the military ===
The Egyptian armed forces have wielded substantial influence over Egypt's economy. Military-run companies operate across many industries and account for a large share of public spending on housing and infrastructure, including cement and food production as well as roads and bridges. According to a study by the Carnegie Middle East Centre, the Egyptian army has control over about 25% of public spending allocated to housing and infrastructure.

Egypt promised the International Monetary Fund (IMF) it would shrink the military's economic footprint, but recent developments point the other way. The National Service Products Organization (NSPO), a firm under military ownership, is building new factories for fertilizers, irrigation machines, and veterinary vaccines. The government discussed selling stakes in military-run companies Safi and Wataniya for two years. Despite claims of receiving offers, there are visible asset transfers, like the rebranding of Wataniya franchises into ChillOut stations. The army's expanding economic influence, from petrol stations to media, has stifled competition, held back private investment, and contributed to slower growth, higher prices, and limited opportunities for ordinary Egyptians.

In 2022, responding to international calls for economic reform, Egypt introduced the State Ownership Policy Document in collaboration with the IMF. The document outlines Egypt's strategy to reduce state and military involvement in the economy, withdrawing entirely from certain industries within three years while maintaining or expanding a presence in strategic sectors. It also aims to draw in more private business by defining the state's economic role, bringing governance of state-owned enterprises up to OECD standards, and promoting competitive neutrality. By the final quarter of 2024, these reforms had led private investment to exceed public investment for the second consecutive quarter, representing over half of total investments. During this period, private investments increased by 35.4% year-on-year, whereas public investments declined by 25.7%, a break from years in which public investment dominated.

=== Climate change ===
An Egyptian cotton field from 1950s

Even without the impacts of climate change, Egypt's arid climate makes it vulnerable for water scarcity and food scarcity. Most of Egypt does not receive much rain, thus all of its agricultural production is around the Nile River. The population of Egypt is increasing, therefore the country will require more food and water. Agriculture is important to the Egyptian economy, making up 11.3% of the GDP and providing 28% of jobs. However, climate change is creating challenges for the agricultural sector. One concern is decreasing crop production. Due to heat stress, water stress, and salinity, food crop yields are projected to decline by 10% by 2050. The crops with the largest yield declines are expected to be maize, oilseeds, sugarcrops and fruits and vegetables.

Egypt is dependent on global markets for wheat imports and food security. Egypt consumes 20.5 million tonnes of wheat a year, half of which is produced domestically with the remaining half supplied from imports. However, wheat yields in Egypt are expected to reduce nearly 20% by 2060. Other impacts of climate change on agriculture include reduced water availability, increased pests and diseases, and a shorter growing period in some places. Prices for imported food will increase as a result of climate change due to global declines in crop production. Hotter temperatures and increased drought will also impact livestock, including cows and chickens. Heat and water stress reduces milk yield and quality, egg yield, and animals' reproductive capacity. Given increases in the human populations and decreases in milk production, models predict that milk availability will decrease by 40 kg per person by 2064. Together, these climate change impacts on agriculture will threaten food security in Egypt.

=== Impact of economic reform on agriculture ===
Neoliberal reforms affected the agricultural sector in Egypt. Before neoliberalism was implemented, the government protected small farmers from losing their land by giving these farmers and their families certain property rights to their plots of land. In the event of eviction, farmers had the right to be compensated for half of the land's value. In 1992, the Egyptian People's Assembly established a new, tenancy law for farmers called Law 96, which was financially supported by the World Bank, International Monetary Fund, and USAID. Law 96 liberalized agricultural rent by pricing agricultural products based on the market rather than on fixed agreements between landowners and farmers working the land. Law 96 increased land rent prices threefold and allowed landowners to evict farmers after a five-year transitional period.

Consequently, government subsidies that supported farmers disappeared and high taxes were put on staple foods produced by local farmers. Farmers had to compete with a growing foreign agribusiness sector in Egypt, and most lost their livelihoods. Egyptian agriculture transitioned toward an export-oriented production in which entrepreneurs bought arable land from the Egyptian government at low costs. This export-led agriculture benefitted the wealthy in Egypt and foreign companies, while displacing farmers and making it difficult for the poor to buy food due to high food prices in the market. A short documentary, "Pity The Nation", in 2008 portrayed the effect of neoliberal policies on farmers in Mahalla al-Kobra.

=== Opportunity cost of conflict ===
A report by Strategic Foresight Group has calculated the opportunity cost of conflict for Egypt since 1991 is almost US$800 billion. In other words, had there been peace since 1991, an average Egyptian citizen would be earning over US$3,000 a year instead of US$1,700.

== See also ==
- The Sovereign Fund of Egypt
- Egypt Vision 2030
- Emerging market
- List of companies of Egypt
- Next Eleven
- Qualifying industrial zone
- Waste management in Egypt
- United Nations Economic Commission for: Africa & Western Asia

== Sources ==
- Cook, Steven A. (2011), The Struggle for Egypt: From Nasser to Tahrir Square, New York: Oxford University Press, ISBN 978-0-19-979526-0
- Greaves, R. H.; Little, O. H. (1930). "Gold Resources of Egypt". Compte Rendu of the XV Session, South Africa, 1929. By International Geological Congress. Pretoria: Wallach. p. 123.
- Lucas, Alfred (1962). Ancient Egyptian Materials and Industries (4th ed.). London: Edward Arnold.
- Manuelian, Peter Der (1998). Egypt: The World of the Pharaohs. Bonner Straße, Cologne Germany: Könemann Verlagsgesellschaft mbH. ISBN 3-89508-913-3.
- Meskell, Lynn (2004). Object Worlds in Ancient Egypt: Material Biographies Past and Present. Berg. ISBN 978-1-85973-867-2.
- Nicholson, Paul T.; Shaw, Ian, eds. (2000). Ancient Egyptian Materials and Technology. Cambridge University Press. ISBN 978-0-521-45257-1.
