= Temsah armoured personnel carrier =

Family of Egyptian-made armoured personnel carriers

The Temsah is a family of armored personnel carriers developed by the Engineering Industries Complex of the Vehicles Department of the Egyptian Armed Forces, in cooperation with the “Military Factory 200 (Armour Production and Repair)” of the National Authority for Military Production, and the “Kader Factory for Developed Industries" of the Arab Organization for Industrialization, for the purposes of transporting serving pedestrians in difficult areas and roads, with an advanced level of protection against various threats.

== Variants ==
=== Temsah Light ===
The Temsah Light vehicle is considered a 4x4 light armored vehicle, designed for patrol, surveillance, and border guard missions. It is built on the chassis of Japanese Toyota Land Cruiser vehicles.

=== Temsah 1 ===
The Temsah 1 is an Egyptian mine-resistant and ambush-resistant MRAP armored personnel carrier, designed primarily for convoy protection, border patrol, counter-insurgency, troop transport, medical evacuation and command and control. Unveiled in 2016, it was designed and developed by Kader Factory For Advanced Industries, and was displayed during the EDEX 2018 exhibition.

=== Temsah 2 ===
The Temsah 2 is an Egyptian MRAP armored personnel carrier, installed and manufactured by the Vehicle Administration. Used in counter-terrorism operations; Because it achieves a D6 level of protection, which provides a very high level of protection for the individual combatant and accommodates 4 to 6 personnel. It is equipped with armor and armament according to the latest international weapons systems.

=== Temsah Bus ===
The Temsah Bus is a MRAP armored personnel carrier can carry 24 soldiers, in addition to its crew of two individuals, for a total of 26 individuals, which means that it can transport a number equal to twice the capacity of conventional armored vehicles.

=== Temsah 3 ===
The Temsah 3 is a protected patrol vehicle (PPV), used for raids or surveillance, flexible and agile, it was designed by the Kader Advanced Industries Factory in Cairo, part of the Industrial Engineering Complex of the Egyptian Ministry of Defense. It was unveiled at EDEX 2018. The Egyptian Ministry of Military Production had signed an agreement with AM General to produce the HMMWV Chassis locally. This step was taken to increase and boost the Egyptian locally produced components in the indigenous armored vehicles, in particular the Temsah 3.

=== Temsah 4 ===
The Temsah 4 is a MRAP armoured personnel carrier with a growth vehicle weight (GVW) of 15 tonnes including a 4 tonnes payload. Kader factory for Developed Industries, a member of the Arab Organization for Industrialization (AOI), unveils Temsah 4 (4×4) armored vehicle during EDEX 2021, the Egypt defense exhibition EDEX that was held in Cairo from 29 November to 2 December 2021. It is optimized for special operations and security forces

=== Temsah 5 ===
The Temsah 5 is a light 4x4 armoured vehicle (LAV) that is designed to conduct patrol or to be used as a cargo vehicle in desert conditions. The layout of the vehicle is based on a pickup design with the engine at the front, crew and troops compartment in the middle, and cargo area at the rear.

=== Temsah Sherpa ===
The Temsah Sherpa is an Egyptian developed and indigenously manufactured Light Tactical Vehicle (LTV) and MRAP armoured personnel carrier based on the French-made Sherpa-2 Light Scout chassis.

=== Temsah 6 ===
The Temsah 6 is a multirole wheeled armoured vehicle that covers numerous missions, ranging from CASEVAC to electronic warfare, to air defence and to command post. It belongs to the Egyptian Temsah armoured personnel carrier family. It is based on a Navistar chassis.

== Operators ==
- Egypt

== See also ==
- ST-100
- ST-500
- Fahd (armored personnel carrier)
- Walid (armored personnel carrier)
