= Temsah 2 =

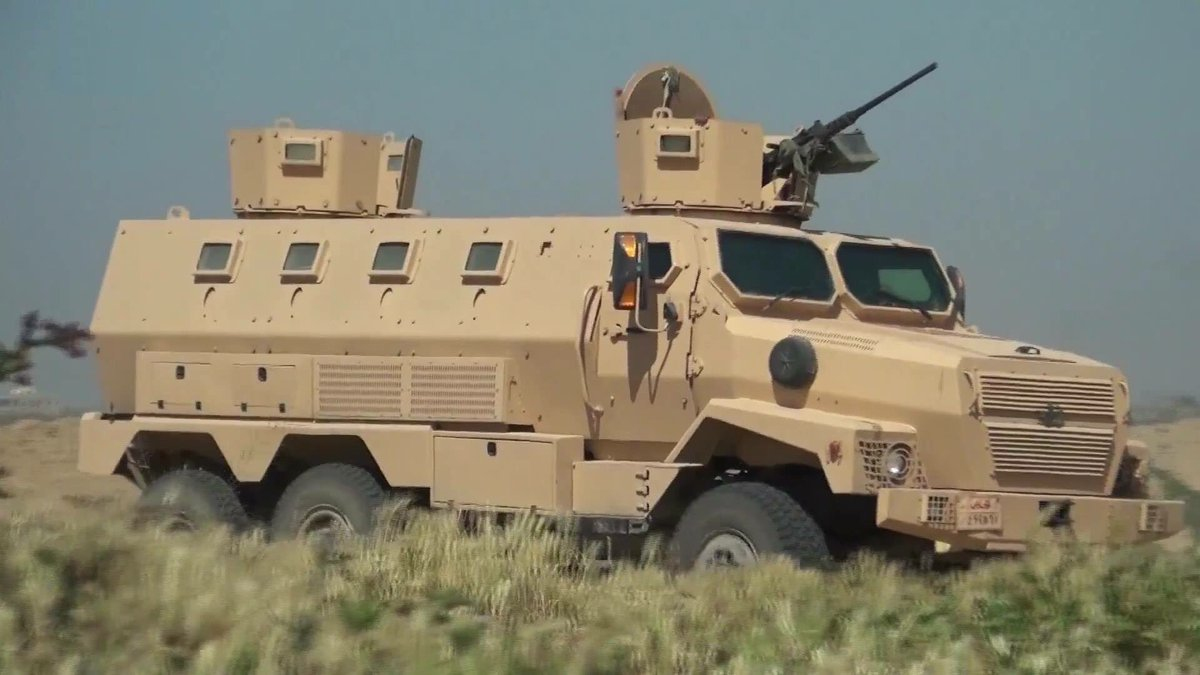
- Type: MRAP
- Place of origin: Egypt

Service history
- In service: 2016-present
- Used by: Egyptian Armed Forces

Production history
- Designer: Arab Organization for Industrialization
- Manufacturer: Kader Factory for Developed Industries

Specifications
- Mass: 13.8 ton without payload, 16.48 ton with payload
- Length: 7.44 m without the extra tire, 8.04 m with the extra tire
- Width: 2.45 m
- Height: 2.60 m without the tower, 3.17 m with the tower
- Crew: 8 to 10
- Main armament: A personnel carrier equipped with a Remote Controlled Weapon Station containing a 7.62 x 51 mm or 12.7 x 99 mm machine gun; A combat vehicle equipped with a combat turret armed with a versatile 30 mm cannon; An Egyptian-made 40 mm automatic grenade launcher
- Engine: Type: Diesel Engine.; Number of cylinders: 8-V.; Maximum power: 240 hp, 2100 rpm.
- Transmission: Manual transmission with 5 forward and 1 reverse speeds with an additional two-speed transmission
- Ground clearance: 400 mm
- Operational range: 600 km
- Maximum speed: 80 km/h

The Temsah 2 is an Egyptian MRAP armored personnel carrier, installed and manufactured by the Vehicle Administration. Used in counter-terrorism operations; Because it achieves a D6 level of protection, which provides a very high level of protection for the individual combatant and accommodates 4 to 6 personnel. It is equipped with armor and armament according to the latest international weapons systems.

== Design ==
The armored hull is fully welded steel armor providing complete protection against 7.62 mm shell attack. Comes equipped with a heavy duty air conditioner. The driver sits in front to the left and the commander sits to the right. Both sit behind large bulletproof windows, and a side door opens to the front, featuring a bulletproof window at the top. And a double back door. The troop compartment is located at the rear of the hull, where the rear door opens horizontally. In the upper part of the troop compartment there are two roof hatches equipped with two combat turrets. Pedestrians sit on explosion-proof seats that can be folded on the sides. On either side of the troop compartment are four firing pins so that troops can use their weapons from inside, and the back door has two firing pins. The armored vehicle can be equipped with optional systems such as military paint, an additional frame with a stand, a machine gun base depending on the type, and a shock-absorbing floor.

The length of the armored vehicle is 7.44 meters, its width is 2.45 meters, its height without the combat turret is 2.6 meters, and its total weight without a payload is 13.8 tons, and with a payload is 16.47 tons.

== Protection level ==
The vehicle has a high level of protection, the level of protection against mines Stange-4, and the level of ballistic protection of the hull, glass and combat tower reaches BR7 to resist armor-piercing 7.62 x 51 mm bullets, with the possibility of adding Anti-Blast Seats and an Advanced Impact shock-absorbing floor Mat, and there are 10 side and rear triggers for firing from inside the armored vehicle.

== Maneuver ==
The speed of the Temsah 2 armored vehicle reaches 80 km/h and a range of up to 600 km. The engine is an 8-cylinder diesel, capable of providing 240 horsepower every 2,100 revolutions, with a manual transmission with 5 forward and 1 reverse speeds with an additional two-speed transmission. Maximum climb angle 31°, maximum lateral bank angle 20°, approach angle 38°, departure angle 36°.

== Development stages ==
As part of the development, the work done on the Temsah 1 armored vehicle was taken advantage of. The company developed the Temsah 2 armored vehicle, which is in fact an extended version of the Temsah 1, while keeping most of the technical data unchanged with the exception of the engine output, which was increased to 240 hp instead of 230, and the weight increased to 16,475 tons with a payload that could reach 2,675 tons, and the number of crew increased from 8 members, including the commander and driver, to 10, and with the increase in length, two additional ports for weapons were added in the rear compartment.

Temsah 2A

Its image appeared for the first time during the annual scientific exhibition of the Military Technical College in the presence of the Minister of Defense and Military Production at the end of July 2016. This was part of the Military Technical College's project to design and implement a system for protecting armored vehicles against blast waves. The study aims to design a light armor system made of composite elements and materials for the Temsah 2 armored vehicle against blast waves. This is the first time that composite materials have been used in the Egyptian production of armored vehicles. During the study, software packages were used to calculate the values of the blast wave on installations and armor, and to calculate the values of the stresses on the armor of the Temsah 2 armored vehicle. And the effect of the blast wave on its lower armor. It has already participated in counter-terrorism operations in Sinai.

Details

6x6 mine-resistant, ambush-resistant MRAP armored personnel carrier with a V-shaped monocoque hull design that distributes the impact of blasts. There are 10 launching ports on the sides and back of the car, and its load capacity is 8-10 people.

Temsah 2B

It appeared for the first time during the EDEX 2018 exhibition.

Details

6×6 armored personnel carrier, MRAP, and a V-shaped monocoque hull design that distributes the impact of explosions. There are 10 launch ports on the sides and back of the car. It had a modification to the front and hood while maintaining the same characteristics of the previous model and adding some other features such as the possibility of adding explosion-proof seats and a shock-absorbing mat. It also contains self-inflating tires, 3 external surveillance cameras, a night vision camera, a front screen, and heavy-duty air conditioning, and comes in several variants as desired:

- Armored personnel carrier equipped with two machine gun turrets.
- Ambulance Vehicle.
- An electronic warfare vehicle for the purposes of disability and wireless communication.
- A personnel carrier equipped with a Remote Controlled Weapon Station containing a 7.62 x 51 mm or 12.7 x 99 mm machine gun.
- A combat vehicle equipped with two combat turrets armed with a versatile 30 mm cannon.

== Operators ==
- Burkina Faso
- Egypt

== See also ==
- Temsah armoured personnel carrier (Egypt)
- Temsah Light
- Temsah 1
- Temsah Bus
- Temsah 3
- Temsah 4
- Temsah 5
- Temsah Sherpa
- Temsah 6
- ST-100
- ST-500
- Fahd (armored personnel carrier)
- Walid (armored personnel carrier)
