= Temsah 1 =

- Type: MRAP
- Place of origin: Egypt

Service history
- In service: 2016-present
- Used by: See Operators below.

Production history
- Designer: Arab Organization for Industrialization
- Manufacturer: Kader Factory for Developed Industries

Specifications
- Mass: 11.10 tons without payload, 13.30 tons with payload
- Length: 6 meters without the extra tire, 6.60 meters with the extra tire
- Width: 2.45 m
- Height: 2.60 m without the tower, 3.17 m with the tower
- Crew: 6 to 8
- Main armament: It is armed with a 40 mm automatic grenade launcher and a 7.62x51 mm automatic rifle or 12.7x99 mm
- Engine: 4-stroke water-cooled diesel with 6 cylinders, capable of providing 230 hp every 2100 rpm, maximum climb angle 38°, maximum side tilt angle ° 20, approach angle 38°, departure angle 37°
- Transmission: Manual
- Ground clearance: 400 mm
- Operational range: 600 km
- Maximum speed: 80 m/h

The Temsah 1 is an Egyptian mine-resistant and ambush-resistant MRAP armored personnel carrier, designed primarily for convoy protection, border patrol, counter-insurgency, troop transport, medical evacuation and command and control. Unveiled in 2016, it was designed and developed by Kader Factory for Developed Industries, and was displayed during the EDEX 2018 exhibition.

It is the advanced, light version of the Temsah, the first version of which appeared for the first time in May 2015 during the President of the Republic's inauguration of development work for the Armed Forces’ vehicle management workshops.

== Design ==
The armored hull is fully welded V-shaped steel armor providing complete protection against 7.62 mm shell attack. Comes equipped with a heavy duty air conditioner. The driver sits in front to the left and the commander sits to the right. Both sit behind large bulletproof windows, and a side door opens to the front, featuring a bulletproof window at the top. And a double back door. The troop compartment is located at the rear of the hull, where the rear door opens horizontally. In the upper part of the troop compartment there is a roof hatch equipped with a combat turret. Pedestrians sit on explosion-proof seats that can be folded on the sides. On either side of the troop room are three firing pins so that the troops can use their weapons from inside, and the back door has two locks. The vehicle can be equipped with optional systems such as military paint, an additional frame with a stand, a machine gun mount depending on the type, and a shock-absorbing floor. Three-day and one-night cameras are installed for all-round surveillance, and images are displayed on a 9-inch monitor installed in the crew compartment.

== Armament ==
It is armed with a 40 mm automatic grenade launcher and a 7.62×51mm automatic rifle or 12.7×99mm.

== Protection level ==
The vehicle has a high level of protection, mine protection level Stange-4 with the possibility of adding Anti-Blast Seats and an Advanced Impact Mat/Shock-Absorbing Floor, ballistic protection level BR7, glass protection level BR7, tower protection level BR7 anti-armour-piercing bullets of 7.62×51mm. There are 8 side and back sliders to fire from inside the vehicle.

== Maneuver ==
The speed of the Temsah 1 armored vehicle reaches 80 km/h and a range of up to 600 km. The engine is a 4-stroke water-cooled diesel with 6 cylinders, capable of providing 230 hp every 2100 rpm, maximum climb angle 38°, maximum side tilt angle ° 20, approach angle 38°, departure angle 37°.

== Development stages ==
=== First version "Temsah" ===
It appeared for the first time in May 2015 during the President's inauguration of development work for the Armed Forces’ vehicle management workshops. It actually participated in counter-terrorism operations in Sinai, where it appeared in a video produced by the Armed Forces Morale Affairs. It was equipped with Cage Armor to protect against RPG shells, and a version of it appeared for electronic and radio jamming applications.

It was a 4×4 lightweight armored personnel carrier. The hull was made of solid, welded armour, and had a distinctive V-shaped unilateral hull design. Its payload was 4-6 people. It had an armor level of B6 and could withstand bullets up to 7.62×51mm in addition to hand grenades. And a limited ability to withstand explosive devices.

=== Armament options ===
The vehicle was armed with a 40 mm automatic grenade launcher and a 7.62 mm automatic rifle.

=== Temsah 1A ===
It appeared for the first time at the Armed Forces ceremony commemorating the 43rd anniversary of the October victories, October 5, 2016.

=== Details ===
4×4 MRAP armored personnel carrier with a V-shaped monocoque hull design that distributes the impact of blasts. There are 6 launch ports (sliders) on the sides and back of the car. It had undergone comprehensive modifications to the structure and chassis, as it is noted that its height from the ground was increased, the side armor was increased, the front, engine cover, windshield and armored doors were modified, as well as the armoring of the combat tower, and its load capacity reached 6-8 people.

=== Temsah 1B ===
It appeared for the first time during the EDEX 2018 exhibition in Cairo.

=== Details ===
4×4 armored personnel carrier, MRAP and V-shaped monocoque hull design that distributes the impact of blasts. There are 8 launch ports (sliders) on the sides and back of the car. It had undergone another modification to the front and hood while maintaining the same characteristics of the previous model and adding some other features such as the possibility of adding explosion-proof seats and a shock-absorbing mat. It also contains self-inflating tires, 3 external surveillance cameras, a night vision camera, a front screen, and heavy-duty air conditioning, and comes in several variants as desired:

- Armored personnel carrier armed with a heavy machine gun or automatic grenade launcher.
- Ambulance.
- Electronic warfare for jamming and radio scanning purposes.
- A remote-controlled weapons station armed with heavy machine guns or an automatic grenade launcher.

== Operators ==
- Egypt
- Libya

== See also ==
- ST-100
- ST-500
- Temsah Light
- Temsah 2
- Temsah Bus
- Temsah 3
- Temsah 4
- Temsah 5
- Temsah Sherpa
- Temsah 6
- Temsah armoured personnel carrier (Egypt)
