= Temsah 4 =

- Type: MRAP
- Place of origin: Egypt

Service history
- Used by: Egyptian Armed Forces

Production history
- Designer: Arab Organization for Industrialization
- Manufacturer: Kader Factory for Developed Industries

Specifications
- Mass: 15 tonnes, 4 tonnes payload
- Length: 6.2 m
- Width: 2.25 m
- Height: 2.27 m
- Crew: it can transport six soldiers in addition to a crew of two
- Main armament: See Armament below
- Engine: Type: Diesel L.; Max. Torque (N.m@rpm): 900@1400; Max. Power (HP@rpm): 245@2200
- Transmission: Automatic
- Ground clearance: 320 mm
- Operational range: 500 km
- Maximum speed: 95 km/h

The Temsah 4 is an Egyptian MRAP armoured personnel carrier with a growth vehicle weight (GVW) of 15 tonnes including a 4 tonnes payload. Kader factory for Developed Industries, a member of the Arab Organization for Industrialization (AOI), unveils Temsah 4 (4×4) armored vehicle during EDEX 2021, the Egypt defense exhibition EDEX that was held in Cairo from 29 November to 2 December 2021. It is optimized for special operations and security forces.

== Design ==
It features a V-shaped chassis to provide space to disperse the blast, and also features an Egyptian made remote-controlled robotic battle turret. The Temsah 4 armoured vehicle is based on a Mercedes-Benz chassis to reduce through-life costs and features scalable protection levels.

Shown at IDEX 2023 was the Temsah 4 based on a Mercedes-Benz 1725 Atego 4x4 chassis, with a maximum gross vehicle weight of 15t of which 4t is payload. In addition to the commander and driver it can carry six dismounts, with options including blast-attenuating seats, runflat tyres and a central tyre inflation system. Cameras provide situational awareness through 360 degrees and there is a single night vision camera for the driver.

It can also be equipped with a GPS system and a military grade paint.

The Temsah 4 is 6.2 meters long, 2.5 meters wide and 2.7 meters high, and is fitted with 365/65/R20 tires, run-flat inserts being available as option. The driver has a 9-inch NVG-compatible display that shows not only the engine data, but also the images provided by one frontal thermal camera and three day cameras. But the vehicle peculiarity is its full modularity; at EDEX the vehicle was shown with the rear module separated, lifted from the chassis thanks to four mechanical jacks. To reduce vibrations a rubber mat is put between the chassis and the module, the lock being done using around 20 bolts that are put in place from the inside of the armoured cabin. This modularity allows a very quick role reconfiguration when deployed in a forward base; modules already been considered include, beside the carrier module, a command post, an ambulance and a rocket launcher.

Other members of the Temsah 4x4 family include the Temsah Sherpa which is based on a French Arquus Sherpa 4x4 chassis as well as the compact Temsah 3, Temsah 5 and Temsah 6 which in addition to being marketed in APC configuration are also available as pick-ups.

== Protection level ==
The welded steel hull provides ballistic protection to level BR6, but this can be upgraded to BR7, against 7.62×51mm armour-piercing rounds. Similar in size to the Temsah 1 armoured vehicle first unveiled in 2015, the Temsah 4 hull is protected against 7.62 mm armor-piercing rounds and splinters, it can transport six soldiers in addition to a crew of two. The vehicle features a roof-mounted day/night and infrared camera system for reconnaissance and surveillance missions. According to information obtained at EDEX mine protection is at Level 4, the Temsah 4 having a ground clearance of 320 mm, all occupants being equipped with anti-blast seats. The Temsah 4 can be equipped with a remotely controlled weapon station mounted on top of the front cabin, which doors are fitted with firing ports.

== Armament ==
The example shown at IDEX 2023 was fitted with the Eagle remote weapon station (RWS) developed by Arab International Optronics, which is typically armed with a stabilised 12.7 mm machine gun with feed from the left and the optronics package on the right. It can also be fitted with other MGs including Russian 12.7 mm and 14.5 mm KPVT heavy guns which feed from the right. The sensor package consists of an uncooled thermal camera, day camera and laser rangefinder with a maximum range of 3,300 m. The RWS also features an embedded simulator and a ballistic calculation computer.

== Maneuver ==
powered by a 245 hp engine with a 900 Nm torque at 1,400 rpm, coupled to an automatic transmission, which allow a maximum speed on road of 95 km/h and a 500 km range.

== Operators ==
Egypt

== See also ==
- Temsah armoured personnel carrier (Egypt)
- Temsah Light
- Temsah 1
- Temsah 2
- Temsah Bus
- Temsah 3
- Temsah 5
- Temsah Sherpa
- Temsah 6
