= Temsah Bus =

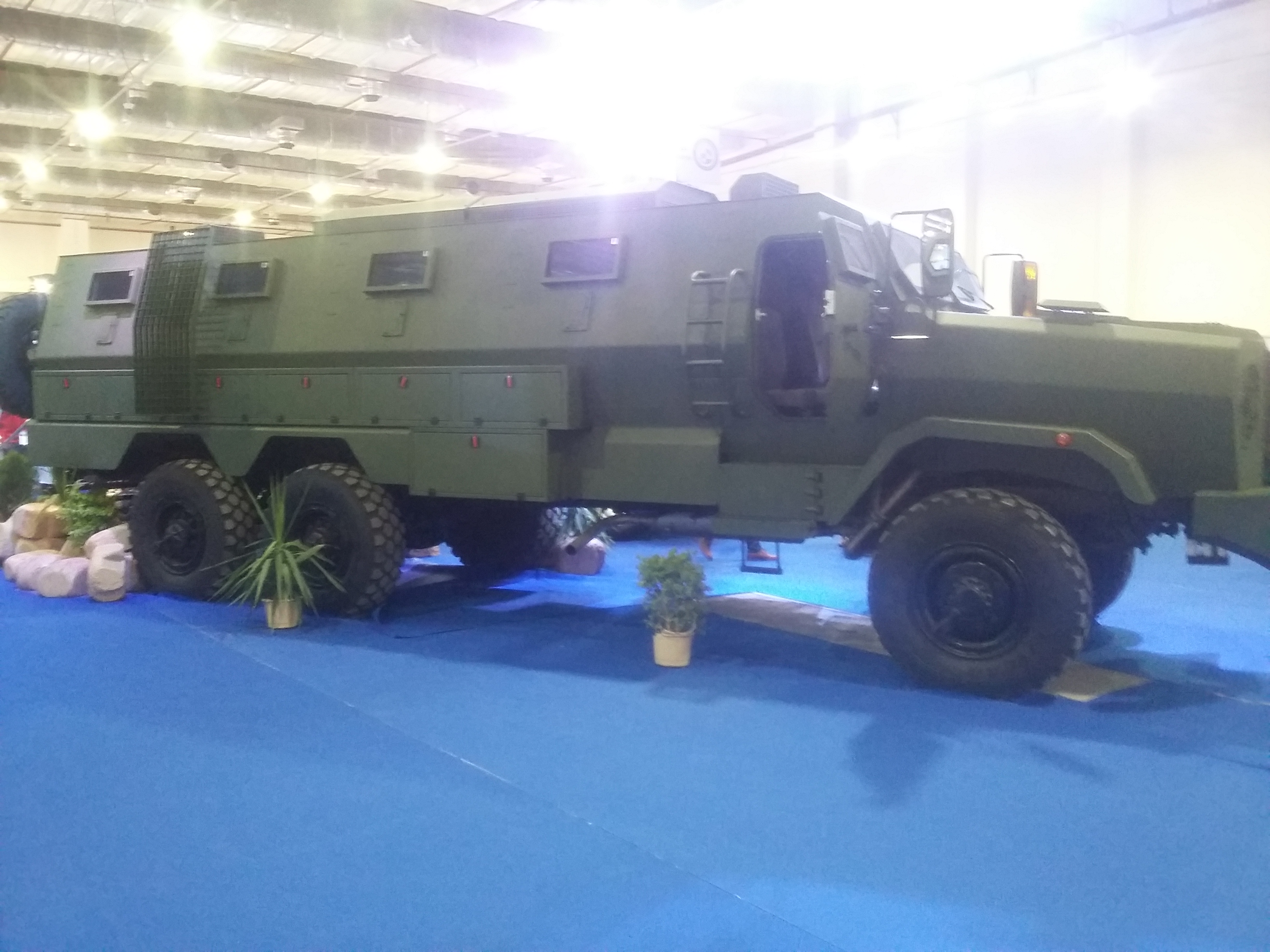
- Type: MRAP
- Place of origin: Egypt

Service history
- In service: 2016-present
- Used by: Egyptian Armed Forces

Production history
- Designer: Arab Organization for Industrialization
- Manufacturer: Kader Factory for Developed Industries

Specifications
- Mass: 16.00 ton without payload, 21.30 ton with payload.
- Length: 9.15 without the extra tire, 9.90 m with the extra tire.
- Width: 2.45 m
- Height: 2.45 m without the tower, 3.10 m with the tower.
- Crew: 26 (2 crew)
- Main armament: No available information.
- Engine: Type: 6.5 L Turbo Diesel.; Number of cylinders: 8-V.; Maximum power: 240 hp, 2100 rpm.
- Transmission: Manual transmission with 5 forward and 1 reverse speeds with an additional two-speed transmission.
- Ground clearance: 400 mm
- Operational range: 600 km
- Maximum speed: 78 km/h

The Temsah Bus is a MRAP armored personnel carrier can carry 24 soldiers, in addition to its crew of two individuals, for a total of 26 individuals, which means that it can transport a number equal to twice the capacity of conventional armored vehicles.

== Design ==
The armored hull is fully welded V-shaped steel armor providing complete protection against 7.62 mm rounds attacks. Comes equipped with a heavy duty air conditioner. The driver sits in front to the left and the commander sits to the right. Both sit behind large bulletproof windows, and a side door opens to the front, featuring a bulletproof window at the top and a single back door. The soldier's compartment is located at the back of the hull, where the back door opens horizontally. The soldiers sit on explosion-proof chairs arranged on both sides, with a path 40 cm wide. On either side of the soldiers' compartment there are four firing ports so that the troops can use their weapons from inside, and the back door contains another port. The vehicle can be equipped with optional systems such as military paint, an additional rack frame, and a shock-absorbing floor. Cameras are installed for three days and one night for all-round surveillance, and images are displayed on a 9-inch monitor mounted in the crew compartment.

== Protection level ==
The vehicle has a high level of protection, the level of protection against mines is STANAG-4, and the level of ballistic protection of the hull and glass reaches BR6 to resist armor-piercing bullets, with the possibility of adding Anti-Blast Seats and an Advanced Impact Mat, and there are 9 side and rear ports for self-defense shooting from inside the armored vehicle, there are two hatches for escape, and anti-RPG nets can be installed on all sides of the vehicle.

== Maneuver ==
The speed of the Armored Temsah Bus reaches 78 km/h and a range of up to 600 km. The engine is an 8-cylinder diesel, capable of providing 240 hp every 2100 rpm, with a manual transmission with 5 forward and 1 reverse speeds with an additional two-speed transmission. Maximum climb angle 31°, maximum lateral bank angle 20°, approach angle 38°, departure angle 36°.

== Development stages ==
=== Temsah Bus ===
It appeared for the first time during the EDEX 2018 exhibition, and is characterized by its long range, comfortable use in the desert, and the ability to confront most obstacles when driving off-road.

=== Details ===
6×6 armored personnel carrier, ambush-protected and mine-resistant, with a V-shaped monocoque hull design that distributes the impact of explosions. There are 9 launch ports on the sides and back of the car. The same features as the previous model, with the addition of some other features, such as the possibility of adding explosion-proof seats and a shock-absorbing mat. It also contains self-inflating tires, 3 external surveillance cameras, a night vision camera, a front screen, and heavy-duty air conditioning, and comes in several variants as desired:

- Armored Personnel Carrier.
- Ambulance Vehicle.
- An electronic warfare vehicle for the purposes of disability and wireless communication.

== Operators ==
- Egypt

== See also ==
- Temsah armoured personnel carrier (Egypt)
- Temsah Light
- Temsah 1
- Temsah 2
- Temsah 3
- Temsah 4
- Temsah 5
- Temsah Sherpa
- Temsah 6
