= Temsah 3 =

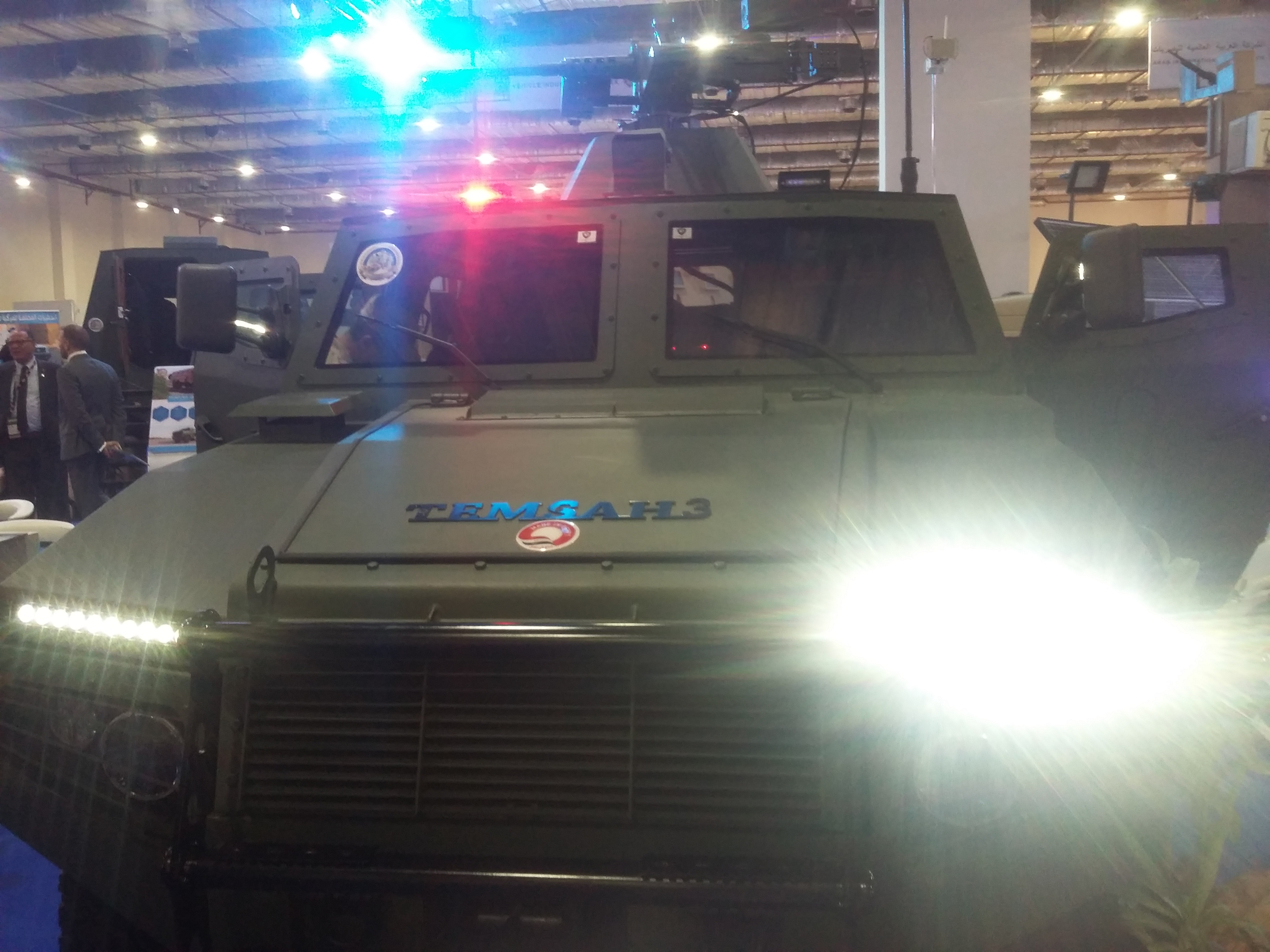
- Type: Light tactical armoured personnel carrier
- Place of origin: Egypt

Service history
- Used by: Egyptian Armed Forces

Production history
- Designer: Arab Organization for Industrialization
- Manufacturer: Kader Factory for Developed Industries

Specifications
- Mass: 5 ton without payload, 6.40 ton with payload
- Length: 5 m without the extra tire, 5.60 m with the extra tire
- Width: 2.22 m
- Height: 2.25 m without the tower, 2.35 m with the tower
- Crew: 4 to 6
- Main armament: Remotely controlled weapon station armed with 7.62x51 mm or 12.7x99 mm heavy machine gun caliber and an Egyptian-made 40 mm automatic grenade launcher
- Engine: Type: 6.5 L Turbo Diesel.; Number of cylinders: 8-V.; Maximum power: 205 hp, 3200 rpm.
- Transmission: Automatic transmission with four forward speeds and one reverse speed; Additional two-speed transmission
- Ground clearance: 400 mm
- Operational range: 442 km
- Maximum speed: 125 km/h

The Temsah 3 is considered a light tactical 4x4 armored personnel carrier, designed for patrol, surveillance and special operations missions. It is built on the chassis of Humvee vehicles from the American company "AM General".

The Temsah 3 is a protected patrol vehicle (PPV), used for raids or surveillance, flexible and agile, it was designed by the Kader Factory for Developed Industries in Cairo, part of the Industrial Engineering Complex of the Egyptian Ministry of Defense. It was unveiled at EDEX 2018. The Egyptian Ministry of Military Production had signed an agreement with AM General to produce the HMMWV Chassis locally. This step was taken to increase and boost the Egyptian locally produced components in the indigenous armored vehicles, in particular the Temsah 3.

== Design ==
The armored hull is an armor based shape based on the HMMWV hull. Comes equipped with a heavy duty air conditioner, the vehicle has tires with a self-inflating system, 3 external surveillance cameras, a night vision camera, a 9" front screen. The driver sits in front to the left and the commander sits to the right. Both sit behind large bulletproof windows, and two side doors open to the front, featuring bulletproof windows at the top. And a single back door. The troop compartment is located at the rear of the hull, where the rear door opens horizontally. In the upper part of the troop compartment there is a roof hatch equipped with a combat turret. Pedestrians sit on explosion-proof seats that can be folded on the sides. On either side of the troop compartment there are 3 firing ports so troops can use their weapons from inside, and the back door has a port. The armored vehicle can be equipped with optional systems such as military paint, an additional frame with a stand, a machine gun base depending on the type, and a shock-absorbing floor. The vehicle features a V-shaped monocoque armored hull design that offers advanced protection to the 4-6 man crew. The hull of the Temsah 3 is of all-welded steel armor construction giving complete protection against attack by 7.62 mm caliber AP rounds and shell splinters. Weighing 6.40 tonnes, including 1,400 kg payload, and up to four passengers can be carried in addition to the crew of two. The vehicle displayed at EDEX 2018, configured for three crew with space to carry two more in the rear, had a Remote Weapon Station fitted.

The length of the armored vehicle is 5.60 meters with the additional frame, its width is 2.22 meters, its height without the combat tower is 2.25 meters, and its total weight without a payload is 5 tons, and with a payload it is 6.40 tons.

== Protection level ==
The vehicle has a high level of protection. There is no information about the level of protection against mines. The level of ballistic protection for the hull, glass, and combat tower reaches BR6 against armor-piercing bullets, with the possibility of adding Anti-Blast Seats. Modern seats provide STANAG 4569 levels of protection and meet by NATO AEP-55 standards. The folding seats are wall-mounted with an advanced energy damper dampening system, a four-point safety harness and an adjustable headrest. There is an Advanced Impact Mat shock-absorbing floor, and there are 7 side and rear ports for firing from inside the armored vehicle.

== Maneuver ==
Compared to the Temsah Light, the Temsah-3 has a ground clearance equal to that of the heavier vehicles, the option for energy absorbing seats being mentioned although no data on mine protection level are provided. A 360° rotating turret can be installed, one extra day camera being added compared to those of the Temsah 1 and Temsah 2. The company is promoting its new product on the international market, awaiting also an order from its national customer.

The 4×4 Temsah 3 is powered by a 6.5 litre, 205 hp turbo-diesel engine that gives it a road speed of 125 km/h (77.7 mph) and cruising range of 442 km (274.6 miles). With a manual transmission with 4 forward and 1 reverse speeds with an additional 2-speed transmission. Maximum climb angle 60°, maximum side slope angle 40°, approach angle 47°, departure angle 40°.

== Development stages ==
=== Temsah 3 ===
The Temsah 3 armored vehicle appeared for the first time at the Defense and Military Industries Exhibition EDEX 2018, and was designed and implemented by one of the Egyptian minds within the armed forces, in a short period not exceeding three months. It is produced at the Kader Factory for Developed Industries, which is part of the Arab Organization for Industrialization.

=== Details ===
4x4 light tactical armored personnel carrier designed for patrol, surveillance and special operations missions. There are 7 firing ports on the side and back of the car, with the possibility of adding explosion-proof seats and a shock-absorbing mat. The car has self-inflating tires, 3 external surveillance cameras, a night vision camera, a head-up screen, and heavy-duty air conditioning, and comes in several variants as desired:

- A troop carrier equipped with a machine gun turret.
- Remotely controlled weapon station armed with 7.62×51mm or 12.7×99mm heavy machine gun caliber.

== Operators ==
Egypt

== See also ==
- Temsah armoured personnel carrier (Egypt)
- Temsah Light
- Temsah 1
- Temsah 2
- Temsah Bus
- Temsah 4
- Temsah 5
- Temsah Sherpa
- Temsah 6
