= Temsah 6 =

- Type: MRAP armoured personnel carrier air defence command post electronic warfare CASEVAC
- Place of origin: Egypt

Service history
- Used by: Egyptian Armed Forces

Production history
- Designer: Arab Organization for Industrialization
- Manufacturer: Kader Factory for Developed Industries

Specifications
- Mass: 16,700 kg
- Length: 6.4 m, 6.7 m with the rear-mounted spare tire
- Width: 2.6 m
- Height: 2.98 m
- Crew: 7+2
- Main armament: Equipped with a Remote Controlled Weapon Station (RCWS).
- Engine: 369 hp
- Transmission: Automatic.
- Ground clearance: 380 mm
- Operational range: 500 km
- Maximum speed: 85 km/h

The Temsah 6 is a multirole wheeled armoured vehicle that covers numerous missions, ranging from CASEVAC to electronic warfare, to air defence and to command post. It belongs to the Egyptian Temsah armoured personnel carrier family. It is based on a Navistar chassis.

== Design ==
The Temsah 6 is a Four-wheel drive (4x4) multirole wheeled armoured vehicle used for various missions from CASEVAC to electronic warfare, to air defence and to command post. It is based on a Navistar chassis with a length of 6.4 m (6.7 m with the rear-mounted spare tire), a maximum width of 2.6 m, a maximum height of 2.98 m. The height increases with the addition of a remotely controlled weapon station, with a model from Escribano visible on the exhibited prototype. The vehicle is also equipped with three external cameras for daytime situational awareness and a night vision camera for the driver, who has a 9-inch screen. It has a mass of 16,700 kg and a crew number of 7+2.

The steel chassis of the Temsah 6 features large windows, including a two-part windshield at the front and full-length windows on the sides of the rear compartment, equipped with firing ports. This configuration allows occupants to use their weapons from inside the vehicle, in line with Egyptian military doctrine. In its troop transport variant showcased at EDEX 2023, the Temsah 6 can accommodate two crew members in the front cabin and seven soldiers in the rear compartment, accessible through the front and rear doors.

== Protection level ==
The initial ballistic protection level of the Temsah 6 is BR6, with the possibility of upgrading to BR7. Mine protection conforms to level 3 a/b of STANAG 4569 standard. Anti-blast seats are also provided for all occupants.

== Armament ==
It is equipped with a Remote Controlled Weapon Station.

== Maneuver ==
It is fitted with a 369 hp engine coupled to an automatic transmission, performances on road at full load ensuring a maximum speed of 85 km/h and a maximum range at cruising speed of 500 km. It is fitted with 395/85/R20 tires with run-flat inserts, a central tire inflation system being installed. It has a ground clearance of 380 mm.

== Operators ==
- Egypt

== See also ==
- Temsah armoured personnel carrier
- Temsah Light
- Temsah 1
- Temsah 2
- Temsah Bus
- Temsah 3
- Temsah 4
- Temsah 5
- Temsah Sherpa
