= Temsah 5 =

- Type: Light armoured vehicle Utility vehicle Scout vehicle Armoured personnel carrier
- Place of origin: Egypt

Service history
- Used by: Egyptian Armed Forces

Production history
- Designer: Arab Organization for Industrialization
- Manufacturer: Kader Factory for Developed Industries

Specifications
- Mass: Combat weight of 3,300 kg and maximum payload of 700 kg.
- Length: 5.10 m
- Width: 1.97 m
- Height: 2.22 m including the turret.
- Crew: Crew of two including a driver and commander seated at the front and two more soldiers can be carried at the rear of the hull.
- Main armament: The roof of the vehicle is fitted with a one-man open-top turret which is armed with one 12.7mm heavy machine gun.
- Engine: Type: Gasoline. Max. Torque (N.m@rpm): 381@4400 Max. Power (HP@rpm): 451@5200
- Transmission: Automatic.
- Ground clearance: 330 mm
- Operational range: 400 km
- Maximum speed: 180 km/h

The Temsah 5 is an Egyptian 4x4 light armoured vehicle (LAV) that is designed to conduct patrol or to be used as a cargo vehicle in desert conditions. The layout of the vehicle is based on a pickup design with the engine at the front, crew and troops compartment in the middle, and cargo area at the rear.

The Engineering industrial complex (EIC) has officially unveiled the Temsah 5 during EDEX 2021, Egypt Defense Exhibition. The Temsah5 is a new member of the Temsah family of wheeled armored vehicles but designed to be used as scout and utility combat vehicles. Engineering industrial complex (EIC) was established in 1978 in Egypt. EIC is one of the unique units that belong to the vehicle department/Egyptian ministry of defense.

== Design ==
The Temsah 5 is based on civilian Toyota chassis that has been configured and modified to respond to the needs of military and security forces. The front of the vehicle is fitted with two large bulletproof windscreens while each side of the hull has two doors that open to the front, each equipped with firing ports. One additional door is located at the rear of the troop's compartment which has a small bulletproof window and one firing port. The vehicle has a combat weight of 3,300 kg with a maximum payload of 700 kg. The roof of the vehicle is fitted with a one-man open-top turret which is armed with one 12.7mm heavy machine gun. In the open position, the hatches provide armor protection for the gunner. The Temsah 5 has a crew of two including a driver and commander seated at the front and two more soldiers can be carried at the rear of the hull. The vehicle has a length of 5.10 m, a width of 1.97 m, and a height of 2.22 m including the turret. It comes with a Heavy Duty Air Conditioner, miliarty grade paint and 5 gun ports.

== Protection level ==
The hull of the Temsah 5 provides ballistic protection BR6 Level able to withstand the firing of small arms 7.62 mm caliber.

== Maneuver ==
The Temsah 5 is powered by a Gasoline engine developing 451 hp at 5,200 rpm with an automatic transmission. The vehicle can run at a maximum speed of 180 km/h with a maximum cruising range of 400 km. It has a ground clearance of 330 mm.

== Operators ==
Egypt

== See also ==
- Temsah armoured personnel carrier
- Temsah Light
- Temsah 1
- Temsah 2
- Temsah Bus
- Temsah 3
- Temsah 4
- Temsah Sherpa
- Temsah 6
