= Temsah Sherpa =

- Type: Light Tactical and MRAP armoured personnel carrier
- Place of origin: Egypt

Service history
- Used by: Egyptian Armed Forces

Production history
- Designer: Renault Truck Defense Egyptian Ministry of Defense vehicle department - Engineering Industrial Complex
- Manufacturer: Egyptian Ministry of Defense vehicle department - Engineering Industrial Complex

Specifications
- Mass: G.V.W: 9.4 tonnes. Curb weight: 8.69500 tonnes. Payload: 0.705 tonnes.
- Length: 6.1 m
- Width: 2.42200 m
- Height: 3.14 m without the turret, 3.27 m with the turret.
- Crew: 2+4
- Main armament: Equipped with a Remote Controlled Weapon Station (RCWS).
- Engine: Type: 4.7L-Diesel. Max. Torque (N.m@rpm): 700@1450 Max. Power (HP@rpm): 180@2300
- Transmission: Automatic.
- Ground clearance: 490 mm
- Operational range: 800 km
- Maximum speed: 100 km/h

The Temsah Sherpa is an Egyptian developed and indigenously manufactured Light Tactical Vehicle (LTV) and MRAP armoured personnel carrier based on the French-made Sherpa-2 Light Scout chassis.

== Design ==
Compared to the original Sherpa Light the look is different, especially in the rear area. While the front does not differ much from the French-made vehicle, it is equipped with new armor and the rear of the vehicle has been modified to provide a fully enclosed cargo area. The roof of the car is equipped with a new remotely operated weapons station. The protected cabin has been stretched towards the rear, allowing to carry 6 soldiers, hosted on anti-blast seats. The rear section hosting two soldiers is elevated compared to the rest of the vehicle, personnel accessing the two rear seats from a back door. Each soldier can use his individual weapon from inside, firing ports being available on the sides, one more being fitted to the rear door in a total number of 7 gun ports.

The Temsah Sherpa is 6.055 meters long, 2.422 m wide, with a 2.09 meters wheel track, a 3.54 meters wheel base and 3.14 m high. Gross vehicle weight is 9,400 kg, with a curb weight of 8,695 kg, which leaves a mere 705 kg of payload, the vehicle is designed for short patrol duties. Maximum height with the turret is 3.27 meters.

It has one night vision camera, three external cameras and a 9" frontal display. It has a tire size of 4+1 (335/80R13, R20 or R 22.5).

=== Protection level ===
It has Ballistic protection of BR6, sufficient against a 7.62×51mm FMJ round, while protection against mines is at Level 1 according to STANAG 4569, the 490 mm ground clearance helping in reducing blast effects. It has anti-blast seats and an Advanced Impact Mat.

=== Armament ===
It is equipped with a Remote Controlled Weapon Station (RCSW).

=== Engine ===
It has a 4.7L-Diesel engine with maximum torque of 1450@700 and maximum power of 2300@180 with an automatic transmission. It has a maximum cruising range of 800 km, maximum speed of 100 km/h and a minimum ground clearance of 490 mm.

== Operators ==
- Egypt: planned to produce an estimated number of 1,000 units.

== See also ==
- Temsah armoured personnel carrier
- Temsah Light
- Temsah 1
- Temsah 2
- Temsah Bus
- Temsah 3
- Temsah 4
- Temsah 5
- Temsah 6
