= Temsah Light =

- Type: Armoured personnel carrier
- Place of origin: Egypt

Service history
- Used by: Egyptian Armed Forces

Specifications
- Mass: 2.7 ton without payload, 3.2 ton with payload.
- Length: 5 m
- Width: 1.77 m
- Height: 1.97 m without the tower.
- Crew: The personnel load is 2 basics + 3 others.
- Engine: A 6-cylinder V6 gasoline engine, generating 228 horsepower at 5200 rpm, with a manual transmission with 5 forward and 1 reverse speeds, with the ability to add an auxiliary transmission.
- Ground clearance: 235 mm
- Operational range: 650 km/h
- Maximum speed: 165 km/h

The Temsah Light vehicle is considered a 4x4 light armored vehicle, designed for patrol, surveillance, and border guard missions. It is built on the chassis of Japanese Toyota Land Cruiser vehicles.

== Design and protection level ==
The vehicle has a heavy-duty air conditioner, and the level of ballistic protection of the hull, glass, and combat tower reaches BR6, which is resistant to bullets caliber 7.62 x 51 mm, and there are 3 side and rear bolts for firing from inside the vehicle. No indication is given on mine protection, the 235 mm ground clearance indicating that this vehicle should not be designed to operate in mine-risky areas. The vehicle is powered by a gasoline engine providing 228 hp, which gives it a considerable power-to-weight ration allowing a maximum speed of 165 km/h and maximum operational range of 650 km/h.

== Operators ==
Egypt

== See also ==
- Temsah 1
- Temsah 2
- Temsah Bus
- Temsah 3
- Temsah 4
- Temsah 5
- Temsah Sherpa
- Temsah 6
- Temsah armoured personnel carrier (Egypt)
