= Fahd (armored personnel carrier) =

Fahd 240/280
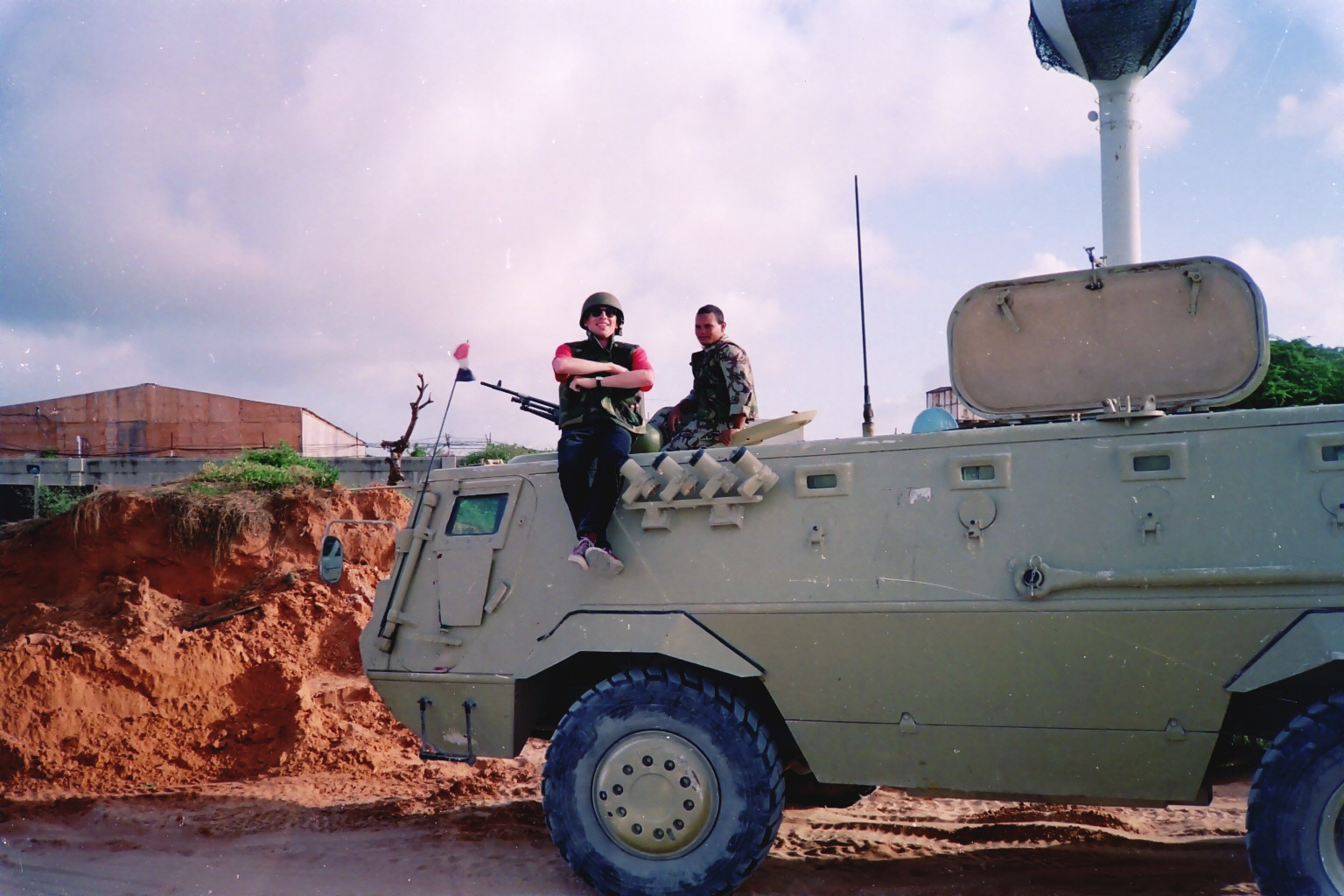
- Egyptian Fahd 240 serving as part of UN Operation in Somalia. Note the smoke grenade launchers on the side and the firing ports.
- Type: Armored personnel carrier
- Place of origin: Egypt / West Germany

Service history
- In service: 1986–present
- Used by: See below
- Wars: Gulf War; Somali Civil War; Algerian Civil War

Production history
- Designer: Thyssen Henschel (today Rheinmetall Landsysteme and part of Rheinmetall Defence)
- Manufacturer: Kader Factory for Developed Industries
- Produced: 1985
- No. built: Over 1,907 (all variants, most users)
- Variants: Mainly Fahd 240, and Fahd 280-30. See text for extended list.

Specifications
- Mass: 10.9 - 12.5 tons (depending on the variant)
- Length: 6 meters
- Width: 2.45 meters
- Height: 2.25 meters (without towers)
- Crew: 2 + 10 passengers (Fahd-240), 3 + 7 passengers (Fahd-280-30)
- Armor: Welded steel
- Main armament: 30 mm automatic cannon 2A42; AT-5 Spandrel or AT-4 Spigot ATGM (Fahd-280-30)
- Secondary armament: 1-3 7.62 mm machine guns
- Engine: Mercedes-Benz Diesel OM 366 LA 4-Stroke turbo-charged water-cooled diesel engine 275 hp at 2,300 rpm
- Suspension: 4 x 4
- Ground clearance: 37 cm
- Fuel capacity: 280 liters
- Operational range: 700 km (on road); 450 km (cross country)
- Maximum speed: 100 km/h (on road); 60 km/h (cross country)

The Fahd is a 4x4 Egyptian armored personnel carrier (APC) produced by Kader Factory for Developed Industries, a subsidiary of Arab Organization for Industrialization. It is mainly used by the Egyptian Armed Forces. It replaced older APCs in Egyptian service such as the BTR-40, and the Walid. It has also been used by the United Nations.

The flexible design of the vehicle, its high speed, maneuverability and long range, on road and off-road, makes it possible to produce various versions to satisfy various military and security purposes. Variants include the Fahd 240/280 APC, Fahd 280-30 IFV, a command post vehicle, ambulance vehicle, light armored recovery vehicle, and can be used for anti-riot purposes, mine laying and mine dispensing purposes, making it possible to form independent units capable of dealing with different threats of armor, low-flying targets, and personnel, with common repair duties, and operation. The Fahd consists of a Mercedes-Benz LAP 1117/32 truck (4 × 4) chassis fitted with an armored body. It has a usual APC configuration of placing the driver and the commander on the front, and a large box-like shape, similar to the German Fuchs.

== Design characteristics ==
The hull of the Fahd is of all-welded steel armor construction giving complete protection against attack by 7.62 mm caliber AP rounds and shell splinters. The vehicle is equipped with air conditioning. The driver sits at the front of the vehicle on the left side with the commander to the right. Both have forward observation via large bulletproof windows, which can be rapidly covered by an armored shutter hinged at the top, and a side door that opens to the front, featuring a window in its upper part that can also be covered by a shutter as well. Above the commander's position is a single-piece, rear-opening hatch cover. The driver has a forward-facing, roof-mounted day periscope, which can be replaced by a passive periscope for night driving. The troop compartment is at the rear of the hull with the infantry entering via a door in the rear, the upper part of which folds upwards and the lower part downwards to form a step. Over the top of the troop compartment are two rectangular roof hatches hinged in the center that can be locked vertically. The infantry sits on individual bucket seats down the center of the vehicle facing outwards. In either side of the troop compartment are four firing ports with a vision block above so that the troops can fire their weapons from within the vehicle. Either side of the rear door has a firing port with a vision block above. Optional equipment may be fitted on the vehicle, such as an NBC protection system and passive IR among others.

=== Armament ===
Up to three weapons may be fitted on to the roof of the Fahd, one on each side of the roof hatches and one to the rear. The armament usually consists of three PK machine guns, each with 1,500 7.62 mm rounds, but other 7.62 mm machine guns can be fitted on the vehicle, such as the FN MAG.

=== Maneuverability ===
The Fahd APC has a top speed of 100 km/h (62 mph) on-road with a range of 700 km. It has average speed of 65 km/h (40 mph) off-road with a range of 450 km. The engine is a Mercedes-Benz Diesel OM 366 LA 4-Stroke turbocharged water-cooled diesel engine, capable of providing 280 hp at 2,200 rpm. The vehicle is able to negotiate slopes up to 80%, and side slopes up to 30%, trenches with a width of up to 0.8 m, and vertical obstacle with a maximum height of 0.5 m, and it has a steering radius of 8 m.

=== Comparison with contemporary vehicles ===
The Fahd APC is relatively lighter, smaller, and better armed than other modern wheeled APCs and IFVs such as the BTR-90 which weighs 20.9 tons, about twice the weight of the Fahd, yet provides similar armament. A LAV-25 costs 900,000 US dollars, and carries less passengers.

Below is a comparison of some modern wheeled IFVs including the Fahd:

Comparison with some modern IFVs
	Fahd 280-30	BTR-3U	VBCI	LAV-25	Type-92 IFV	BTR-90	VBM Freccia
Country of origin	Egypt	Ukraine	France	Canada	China	Russia	Italy
Weight	12.5 t (13.8 short tons)	16.4 t (18.1 short tons)	26 t (29 short tons)	12.8 t (14.1 short tons)	12.5 t (13.8 short tons)	20.9 t (23.0 short tons)	26 t (29 short tons)
Primary armament	30 mm (1.2 in) 2A42 automatic cannon	30 mm (1.2 in) dual-feed cannon	25 mm NATO dual-feed cannon	25 mm NATO M242 chain gun	25 mm (0.98 in) Autocannon	30 mm (1.2 in) 2A42 automatic cannon	25 mm (0.98 in) Oerlikon KBA
Secondary armament	7.62 mm (0.300 in) FN MAG machine gun	7.62 mm (0.300 in) coaxial machine gun	7.62 mm (0.300 in) coaxial machine gun	2 x 7.62 mm (0.300 in) M240 machine gun	7.62 mm (0.300 in) coaxial machine gun	7.62 mm (0.300 in) PKT machine gun grenade launcher	7.62 mm (0.300 in) coaxial machine gun
Missile armament (range)	AT-5 Spandrel (70-4,000 meters)	AT-5 Spandrel (70-4,000 meters)	-	-	-	AT-5 Spandrel (70-4,000 meters)	Spike LR (200–4000 meters)
Road range	700 km (430 mi)	600 km (370 mi)	750 km (470 mi)	660 km (410 mi)	800 km (500 mi)	800 km (500 mi)	800 km (500 mi)
Maximum on-road speed	100 km/h (62 mph)	85 km/h (53 mph)	100 km/h (62 mph)	100 km/h (62 mph)	85 km/h (53 mph)	100 km/h (62 mph)	110 km/h (68 mph)
Maximum capacity	3 crew + 7 passengers	3 crew + 6 passengers	2 crew + 9 passengers	3 crew + 6 passengers	3 crew + 9 passengers	3 crew + 7 passengers	3 crew + 8 passengers

== Variants ==
=== Fahd 240 ===
The Fahd 240 is based upon the latest Mercedes-Benz LAP 1424/32 chassis. This variant includes a far more powerful engine and a slight increase in armor. It has the same engine as the Fahd. All original Fahds have been updated to this standard, and it is the main variant in service with the Egyptian Army. It weighs 11.6 tons. The seating arrangement and design characteristics are similar to the original Fahd APC. It has a crew of two and can carry ten soldiers. On top of the passenger compartment are two large roof hatches, hinged at the center of the vehicle. They sit facing outward down the center of the vehicle. Each passenger has a firing port, giving four ports on either side of the vehicle. The armament is similar to the original Fahd.

==== Other armament options ====
- 20mm Auto-cannon: The APC variant can be armed with turrets armed with weapons ranging from 7.62 mm machine gun (see Variant with BTM-208 turret) to 20 mm cannon
- MILAN Anti-tank guided missile: The APC variant can also be equipped with a MILAN missile vehicle mount to be able to negotiate armor and low flying threats.

=== Fahd 240 recovery and repair variant ===
Fahd 240 recovery and repair vehicle specification
Maximum arm length	Four meters
Maximum angle of boom elevation	70 degree
Angle of traverse	315
Slewing speed	1.5 r.p.m
Boom specifications
Lifting capability (ton)	Boom length (meter)
2	2.0 vehicle stopped
1.5	2.7 at stop
1	4.0 at stop
1	2.7 with a speed of 15–20 km/h
0.65	4.0 with a speed of 15–20 km/h

Based on the latest production Fahd-240, it shares the position and entry doors for the commander and the driver with the APC variant. A 2.5 ton turnable-mounted hydraulic crane is mounted on the roof rear, with a telescopic jib that has 315 degrees of traverse, with the boom being elevated to +70 degrees. The vehicle contains two hydraulic stabilizers for the crane, in which they are lowered to the ground while the crane is being used to provide a more stable platform. The vehicle is 13 tons in weight, and 2.8 meters in height.

The vehicle includes the following specialized equipment for repair duties: an air compressor, electric power unit, battery charger, testing unit, portable drill and grinder, tire repair set, radiator set, tool set, greasing equipment, hydraulic jack, oxy acetylene set, recovery equipment and a tent.

=== Fahd Ambulance ===
The ambulance variant is based on the basic Fahd APC design, with modifications for its specialized purpose. The vehicle has the ability to serve four laying patients, and another four sitting patients. The vehicle has a crew of three, these are: driver, physician, and a dresser. The ambulance variant additional external flasher, and a search light mounted on the rear door for emergency. Along with one tent and dual interior lights, the vehicle is equipped with specialized medical instruments.

=== Fahd mine laying vehicle ===
Another conversion of the Fahd APC enables it to become a mine laying vehicle. The mine are of anti-tank type, where these vehicles are used as mobile systems with high maneuverability, and the ability to lay anti-tank mine fields in a short time. The mine laying system used on the Fahd is the Nather-2. The mine laying system is equipped with a control unit that computes the tube firing sequence delay time to set mine densities, and adjusts the required dispensing direction. The mines can be dispensed on right, left and backwards of the vehicle.

The mine layer can create a mine field from 1,500 to 3,000 metres long and 25–30 metres wide from four dispensing modules firing 600 mines per salvo giving a mine density between 0.2 and 1 mine per square meter.

=== Fahd command vehicle ===
The Fahd command vehicle contains three gun mounts for 7.62 mm caliber machine guns, as well as other special equipments for command purposes. The command vehicle is equipped with three-four wireless communication set with antennas and six terminals intercom system, a 10-line telephone exchange and two field telephones powered from a 1.5 kW electrical generator.

=== Fahd 280 w/ BTM-208 Turret ===
This IFV variant is essentially a Fahd 240, fitted with a dual-weapon turret that has a 12.7 mm machine gun and a 7.62 mm machine gun. The addition of a turret requires a third crewman, the gunner, but it does not affect the Fahd 240's passenger capacity. The turret is the French BTM-208 turret, produced under license from the French SAMM company. It is air-tight, and provides NBC protection. It incorporates and aiming telescopic periscope, forward–observation, rotating mirror periscope in co-axial alignment with weapons, and five or six bullet-proof glass ports insuring all-round vision and ballistic protection. 200 rounds are provided for the 7.62 mm machine gun, and another 100 for the 12.7 mm machine gun. Elevation limits are -8 and +45, the turret provides 360 degrees of traversion for the weapons. The vehicle has a rotating seat, and an armored hatch for the turret. The machine guns can be fired by means of a foot pedal, freeing the gunner's hands. A central console groups control switches and warning lights governing weapon selection. The addition of a turret increases the vehicle height to 2.85 meters.

Power from the vehicle's 24V DC supply is delivered through an electric slip ring, which features tracks for intercom circuits between gunner and other crew members. The vehicle uses ventilator extraction of firing gases and fumes.

=== Fahd Anti-Riot ===
The Anti-Riot variant is based on the Fahd 280. The dual weapons installed in the turret are replaced with a water cannon actuated at 180 L/min pump to jet plain, colored or mixed water at a distance of 30–50 m. Grenade launchers are also installed on the turret for firing smoke and tear gas grenades. There is a steel grader in the vehicle front to remove barricades in streets and passes, along with two flashers, multi-tone siren, loud speaker and horn. This variant also has a passenger capacity of ten.

=== Fahd 280-30 ===
The Fahd 280-30 is an IFV variant of the Fahd, first announced in 1990. It features a BMP-2 turret on the roof of the passenger compartment near the rear. It has a 30 mm automatic cannon with a dual feed, one for HE rounds, the other for AP rounds, which can pierce 18 mm armor at 60 degrees from a range of 1500 m. It also has a coaxial 7.62 mm PKT machine gun and an ATGM launcher, capable of launching AT-4 or AT-5 missiles which use SACLOS guidance, increasing the range at which the Fahd 280-30 can engage armored targets such as tanks to nearly 4000 m. These turret-mounted missiles may be deployed away from the vehicle on a launching tripod. The Fahd-30 carries 500 30 mm rounds for the autocannon, 2,000 rounds for the 7.62 mm machine gun, and five AT-5 missiles. Smoke grenade launchers are standard on this vehicle, with four on each side of the turret. The BMP-2 turret may use appliqué armor. In terms of design it is similar to the Fahd 240, but this variant has three firing ports on each side of the vehicle.

The Fahd 280-30 has a third crewman, a gunner positioned in the turret, in addition to the commander and driver. As a result of the relatively large turret this variant has a reduced passenger capacity; it can carry seven passengers instead of the original ten. The turret is standard-equipped with passive IR and night vision sensors. It also has fire control and stabilization. As a result of the armament on the Fahd 280-30, the IFV can provide fire support to infantry and it is capable of engaging tanks, armored vehicles, low flying aircraft, helicopters and personnel, with the ability to engage in a stationary position, on the move, in day or nighttime conditions, with high accuracy. The unit price is $254,246.

==== 2A42 30mm cannon ====
The gas-operated gun is a dual feed multipurpose small caliber weapon, that has a dual rate of fire with a minimum rate of 200-300 or 550 rounds per minute (rds/min), where the rapid fire mode assures 800 rds/min. The sustained rate of fire is 200 rds/min, though. The gun is intended for engaging materiel, low flying aircraft, light vehicles, and dismounted infantry. With a muzzle velocity of 960 m/s, the gun is capable of defeating a light Armored Personnel Carrier at a range of 1,500 meters, a soft-skinned vehicle at 4,000 meters, and slow-flying aircraft at altitudes up to 2,000 meters and slant ranges of up to 2,500 meters.

=== Fahd 300 ===
At EDEX 2018, the Arab Organization for Industrialization (AOI) presented a new modernized version of the Fahd under the name of Fahd 300.

The Fahd 300 benefits from many improvements and is based on a new Tatra chassis offering more mobility in all-terrain conditions, and powered by a Cummins turbodiesel engine. The Fahd 300 can reach a maximum speed of 105 km/h, with a maximum cruising range of 700 km. It has a new V-shaped hull design with a new armor offering more protection against ballistic and IEDs (Improvised Explosive Device) threats.

The Fahd 300 can accommodate 13 military personnel including driver, commander and gunner. Driver and vehicle commander have a large bulletproof windscreen that can be covered by a shutter hinged at the top. The rear part of the hull has been raised compared to the original version of the Fahd, offering more internal volume for the troop compartment. Troops can enter and leave the vehicle via a door located at the rear of the hull, the upper part of which folds upwards and the lower part downwards to form a step.

At EDEX 2023, an ambulance variant known as the Fahd 300-MD was presented.

== Service history ==
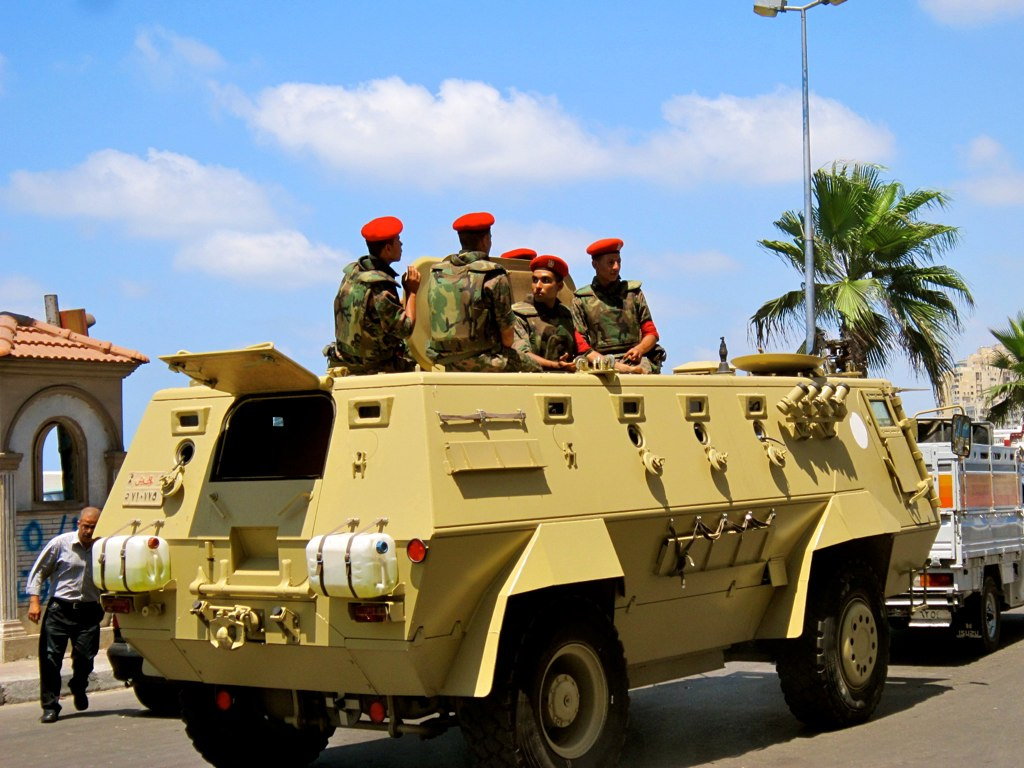
Egyptian Military Police in Alexandria

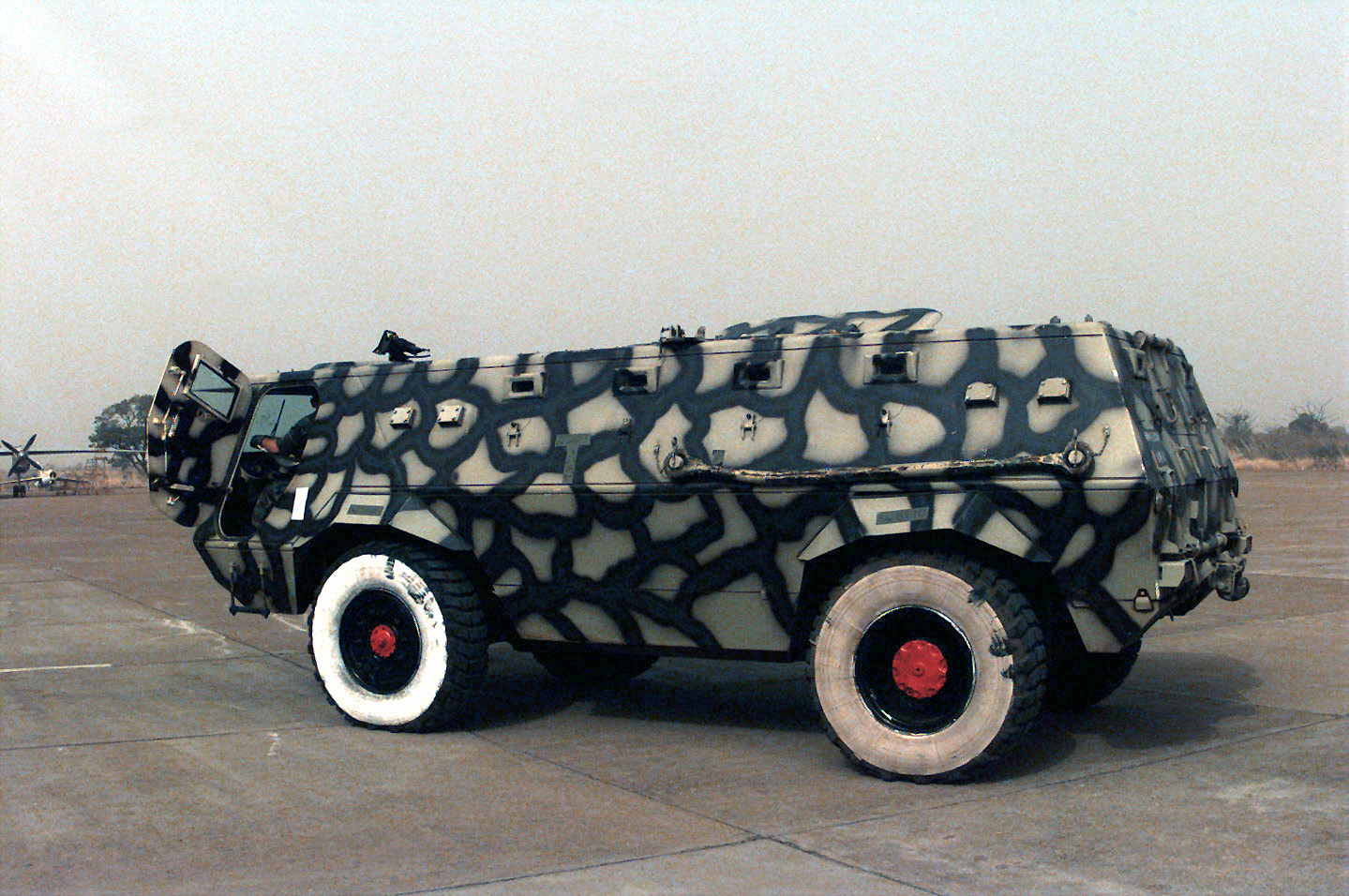
Malian Fahd being airlifted during an ECOMOG mission to Liberia

The Fahd have been used by eight countries including Egypt, and also served under the United Nations. It has seen service as a part of SFOR in Bosnia and Herzegovina, and as a part of UNOSOM in Somalia.

=== Egypt ===
The vehicle was originally designed to fit Egyptian requirements by Rheinmetall Landsysteme (then Thyssen-Henschel, part of Rheinmetall DeTech) under the designation TH 390. The first prototypes of the vehicle were built in Germany for Egypt. Production was undertaken by the Kader Factory for Developed Industries, part of the Arab Organization for Industrialization. The production commenced in 1985. The first vehicles have been completed in 1986 to enter service with the Egyptian Army. The Egyptian Army is believed to have placed an initial order for 300 vehicles with an option of further 110. Egypt uses the Fahd for border patrolling, where these vehicles are equipped with extra periscopes, and night vision equipments. The Fahd is also used by the Egyptian National Police and the Central Security Forces; these vehicles are usually the Anti-riot version or the standard APC variant provided with a box-type shield around the commander's hatch. The vehicle has been used by Egyptian forces in peace keeping missions, and have served with SFOR in Bosnia and Herzegovina.

The military, and paramilitary users of the Fahd in Egypt are:

- Egyptian Army
- Central Security Forces

=== Kuwait ===
Egypt sold Kuwait 110 vehicles. Kuwait has been reported to operate about 100 units in 1988, where most of the vehicles were captured and/or destroyed by the Iraqi forces. Currently, Kuwait has 60 vehicles; some more vehicles were received in 1994. A report of the secretary general of the United Nations Security Council shows that most of the units that were captured by Iraq were returned to Kuwait as part of the return of property seized by Iraq hand over operations that have taken place from the second of March 1994 to 15 October 1996. A total of forty vehicles have been returned on three phases. See the table above for details. Not all of the vehicles are in active service with the Kuwaiti Army currently.

== Operators ==
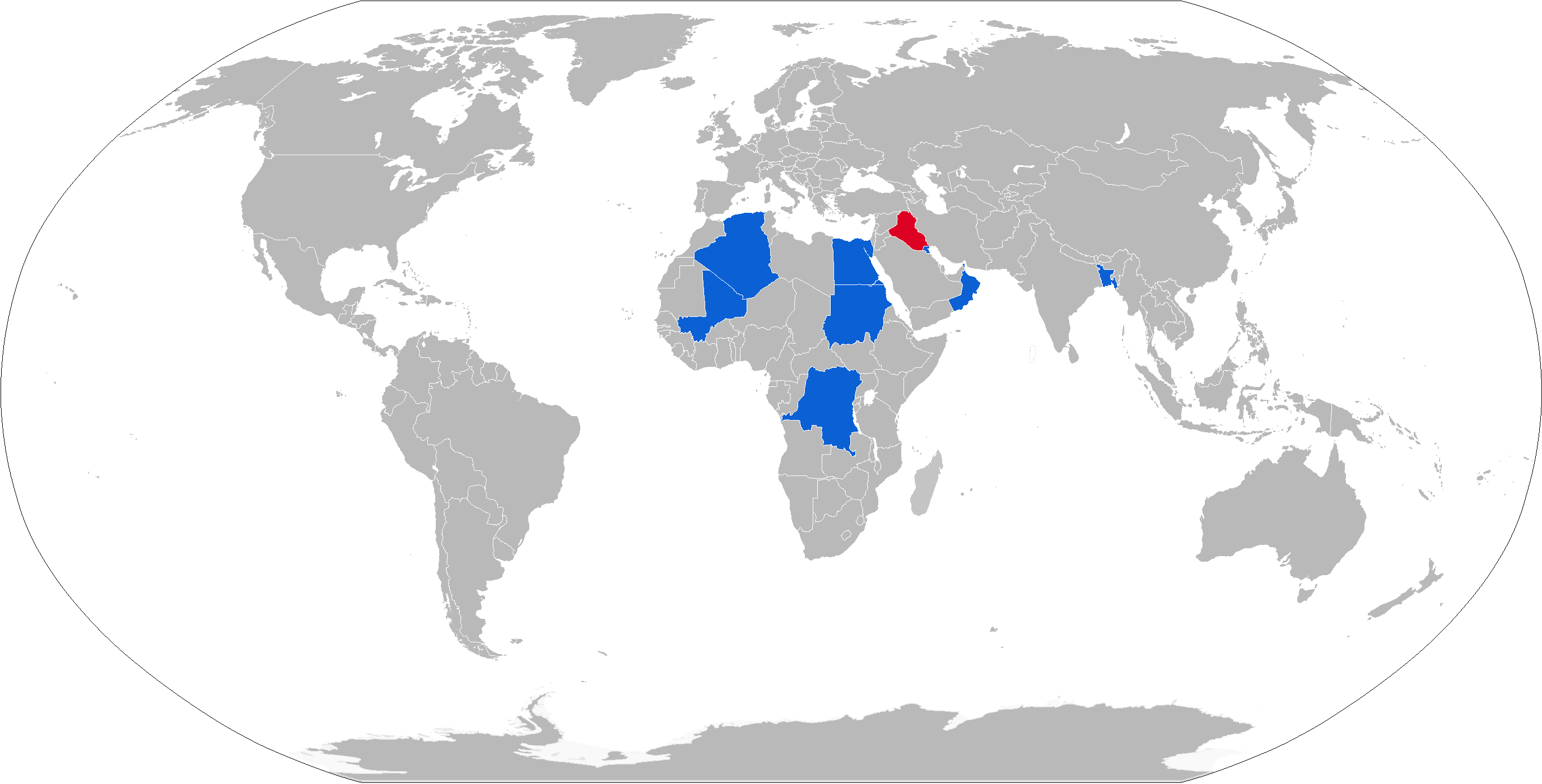
Map of Fahd operators in blue with former operators in red

=== Current operators ===
- Algeria: 200 in service - The only export deal for the vehicle between 1992 and 2006 was to Algeria. The deal was for 53 units of the Fahd 240 APC variant, for use in the internal security role and by the Gendarmerie. Currently, there are 100 units in service with the Algerian forces as of 25-Feb-2008.
- Burundi: 19 Fahds used by the Burundian Army as of 2019.
- Burkina Faso
- Democratic Republic of the Congo - 20 delivered between 1988 and 1990. Currently 7 are in service.
- Egypt: 1,400 in service - Producer, and main operator. Operates around 900 Fahd 240s, 235 Fahd 280s w/ BTM-208 turret, and 265 Fahd 280-30s.
- France: 16 Fahds used by French forces participating in peacekeeping operations, modified and upgraded to meet the required combat standards.
- Kuwait: 60 in service - Second largest operator in 1988. The Fahd was used by the Kuwaiti side during the invasion of Kuwait, when it lost most of them. Kuwait received more units in 1994, and had most of its captured units returned by Iraq in 1995.
- Mali: 5 delivered in 1990.
- Oman: 31 in service
- Sudan: The Fahd has been sold to Oman and Sudan, but because Egypt considered the value of its military exports confidential, it omitted this information from its published trade statistics.

=== Former operators ===
- Bangladesh: 60 Fahd-280 were bought in 1993. The Bangladesh Army used these vehicles widely in patrolling missions along the Iraq-Kuwait border during UN sanctioned peacekeeping missions.
- Iraq: All retired after 2003. Although not supplied by Egypt, Iraq was able to capture most of the Kuwaiti vehicles in the invasion of Kuwait. These units were then used by Iraq during the Gulf War and the 2003 invasion of Iraq. After the Iraqi invasion in 2003, the Iraqi army is not reported to be using them.

== See also ==
- Armored warfare
- Armored personnel carrier
- Infantry fighting vehicle
