= Sherpa Light =

French light tactical vehicle

Renault Sherpa Light
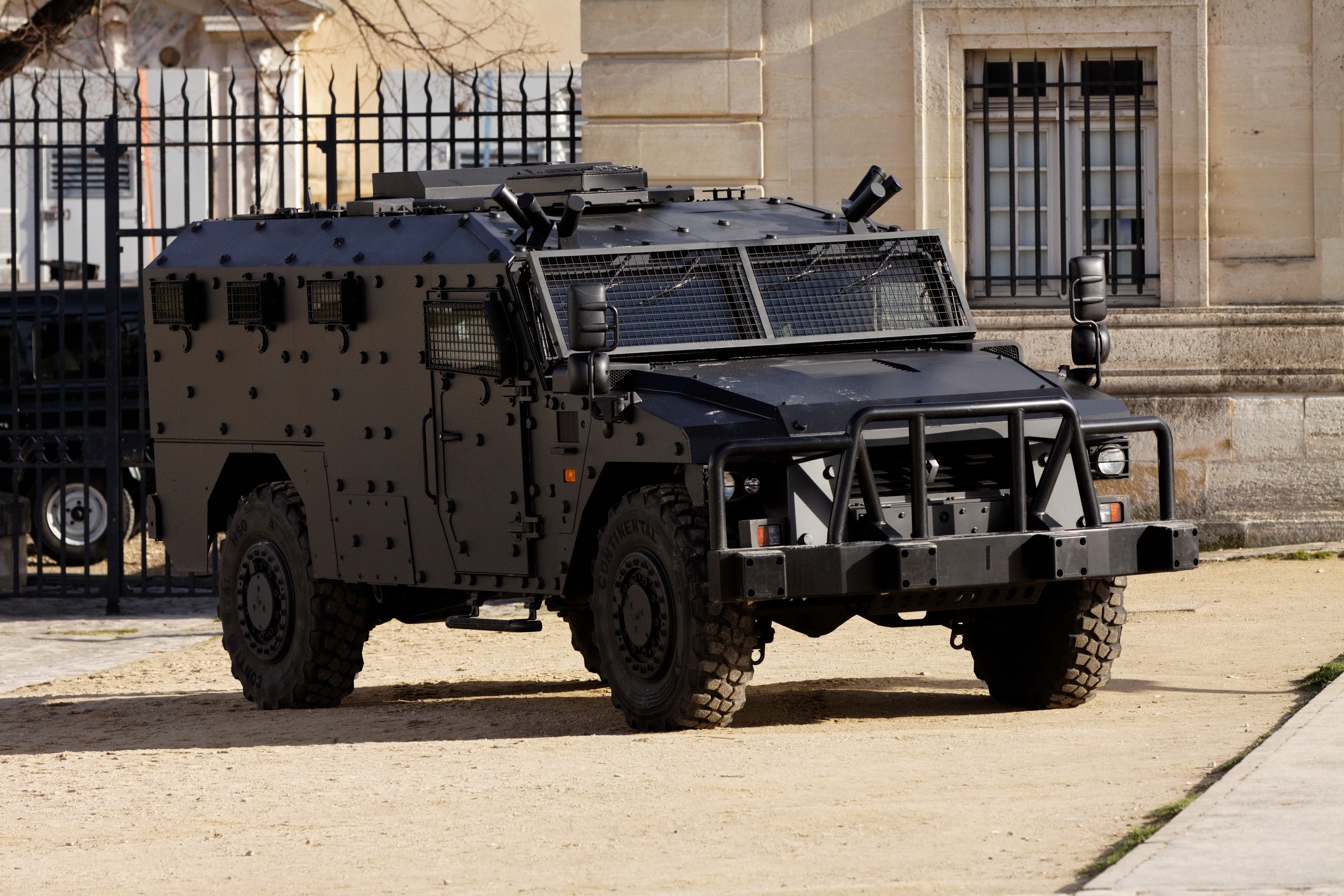
- A Renault Light Scout APC on display.
- Type: Light tactical vehicle
- Place of origin: France

Service history
- In service: 2006–present
- Used by: See Operators

Production history
- Designer: Renault Truck Defense
- Designed: 2006–present
- Manufacturer: Renault Truck Defense (Former); Arquus (Current); Avibras (Brazil); MACK Defense (North America/Oceania); Pindad (Indonesia)

Specifications
- Mass: 7.7 to 9.8 t
- Length: 5,900 mm (232.3 in)
- Width: 2,200 mm (86.6 in)
- Height: 2,100 mm (82.7 in)
- Crew: 4 or 5
- Armor: CEN 1063 and STANAG 4569
- Main armament: up to 12.7 mm (machine gun) and 40mm (grenade launcher)
- Engine: Euro 3 or 5; 215 hp (160 kW)
- Suspension: Rigid axles with coil springs and telescopic shock absorbers on front and rear
- Operational range: 800 to 900 km
- Maximum speed: 110 to 120 km/h (68–75 mph)

The Sherpa Light is a family of 4x4 tactical and light armoured vehicles developed by French company Renault Trucks Defense (RTD). Available in unarmoured or armoured variants (ballistic, mine and IED kits), the Scout is suited for tactical missions such as scouting, patrol, convoy escort and command and liaison. It is able to transport up to four or five soldiers or a total payload of up to four tonnes.

The Sherpa family is also available to customers in North America and Oceania via Mack Defense.

== History ==
The Sherpa 2/3 was officially unveiled to the public at Eurosatory 2006 in Paris. with first production models made in 2007. In 2010, it changed the name from Sherpa 2 and 3 to Light.

The Sherpa Light was shown in Asia in the BRIDEX 2011 convention alongside the VAB Mk II in Brunei on July 28, 2011.

On October 26, 2011, Pindad showed off an Indonesian-made version of the Sherpa known as the Elang during a public exhibition event.

Mack Defense unveiled the Mack Sherpa Light Scout for the first time at the 2014 Association of the United States Army AUSA Annual Meeting & Exposition (AUSA) event in Washington DC. In 2017, Mack promoted the Sherpa Special Forces variant at the Special Operations Forces Industry Conference in Tampa, Florida.

In April 2014, Avibras entered the TUPI to be assessed at the Brazilian Army Assessments Center (CAEx). Based on the Sherpa Light Scout chassis under cooperation between Avibras and Renault, it is meant to be marketed to the Brazilian Army for a new Wheeled Multirole Light Armored Vehicle under the Viatura Blindada Multitarefa - Leve de Rodas (VBMT - LR; Lightweight Wheeled Multirole Protected Vehicle) program against the Iveco LMV with a contract decision before the end of 2015.

In 2015, MACK-made Sherpas were presented to the National Guard of Ukraine for potential purchases and evaluation.

In 2016, requirements from French Special Operations Command resulted in the development of the Poids Lourd Forces Spéciales for rapid response operations. The PLFS was first shown at the Eurosatory 2016 exhibit on June 13, 2016. It was officially certified by the Direction générale de l'armement on January 31, 2017. In Brazil, the TUPI lost a potential contract for the Brazilian Army's VBMT-LR program when the Brazilian Army announced on April 14, 2016, that the Iveco LMV will be selected as the new 4x4 vehicle, followed by another announcement on September 1, 2016, that 1,464 LMVs will be purchased instead.

After RTD was rebranded as Arquus on May 24, 2018, research and development continued on the Sherpa, which led to the creation of the Sabre as its first Arquus-branded product when it was unveiled at the 2019 Special Forces at the Defense Exhibition (SOFINS) exhibit. Field tests were conducted with an MMP missile fired from the Sabre under the direction of the Direction Générale de l’Armement as of February 2021.

On May 19, 2020, Arquus announced the successful production of the 1000th Sherpa Light vehicle.

At the EDEX 2021 convention, it was announced that Arquus will collaborate with the Egyptian Ministry of Defence Vehicle Department – Engineering Industrial Complex. The chassis is provided by Arquus.

On September 22, 2021, Arquus offered to work with Romania in manufacturing the Sherpa Light under license under a proposal for greater French-Romanian defense cooperation.

It was reported in SOFINS 2023 that the 25 Sabres used by French special forces from 2017 gave unsatisfactory results in road handling and stability, so they were returned to Arquuus. All of them were retrofitted based on feedback.

A Sherpa APC was on display at MILIPOL 2023 on November 15, 2023, in use with the BRI.

== Variants ==
=== French variants ===
The following variants are made by Renault Trucks Defense, and later by Arquus.

=== Pre-2010 ===
- Sherpa 2: Basic version with four seats and loading capacity of 2.5 cubic meters and 2 tons.
- Sherpa 3: Basic version with two seats, no armored cabin and loading capacity of 3.5 tons.
- Sherpa 3A: Same as the Sherpa 3, but with an armored cabin.
- Sherpa 3 Grand Volume: Long chassis body with space for ten persons.
- Sherpa 3 Special Forces: Light attack vehicle in special forces operations.
- Sherpa 3 High Intensity: For special forces units operating in recon roles.

=== Post-2010 ===
- APC: Three door version which can carry up to ten persons while having capability to have weapons mounted on top.
- Assault Ladder: Designed for counter-terrorist forces which have modular platform with hydraulic ramp and ladders up to 8.5 m.
- Scout: Four door vehicle designed for Reconnaissance, Patrol, Surveillance and Command Post with maximum of five persons. The windshield and doors can have ballistic windows. Sold through MACK Defense as the Sherpa Scout.
- Special Forces: Light attack vehicle with provisions to mount weapons on top while capable of mounting armored and mine protection kits. It can seat two persons in front, one at the rear for a gunner and another for one more person at the rear. Sold through MACK Defense as the Sherpa Special Forces.
  - Poids Lourd Forces Spéciales or Special Forces Heavy Weight: Customized vehicle made on request based on French special forces requirements. Known to have a combat and logistics version. Can be outfitted with two radios and a self-recovery winch while having at least more seat for another person, having a seat capacity for 5 persons. Has a stronger engine at 265 hp.
  - Sabre: A further developed variant of the SF vehicle, Arquus unveiled it to the public at the 2019 SOFINS exhibit. Similar to the PLFS, except that it can mount more radios/other C4ISR equipment when required.
- Station Wagon: Five door version of Scout designed for Reconnaissance, Patrol, Surveillance, Systems transport and Internal security with maximum of five persons.
- Weapon System Carrier: Designed to operate with mounted weapon on vehicle flatbed. Sold through MACK Defense as the Sherpa Carrier.
- Armored Ambulance
- Internal Security Vehicle

=== Foreign variants ===
- Mack Sherpa: American badged version of the Sherpa, first unveiled in 2014.
  - Mack Sherpa Hawkeye 105mm: A Sherpa Carrier with a Mandus Group-mounted 105mm howitzer.
- Avibras TUPI: Brazilian-made badged version unveiled in 2014. (Note: The TUPI is being marketed by Avibras as of 2019.) It was to be equipped with either an ARES Aeroespacial & Defesa REMAX remote-controlled weapon station or W&E Platt MR550 shielded ring mount armed with a 7.62×51mm or 12.7×99mm machine gun, or 40 mm automatic grenade launcher. The Tupi was made for the Brazilian Army's Light Wheeled Multi-Task Armored Vehicle (VBMT-LR) project.
- Pindad Elang: Indonesian-made version of the Sherpa Light in collaboration with Renault.
- Temsah Sherpa

== Operators ==
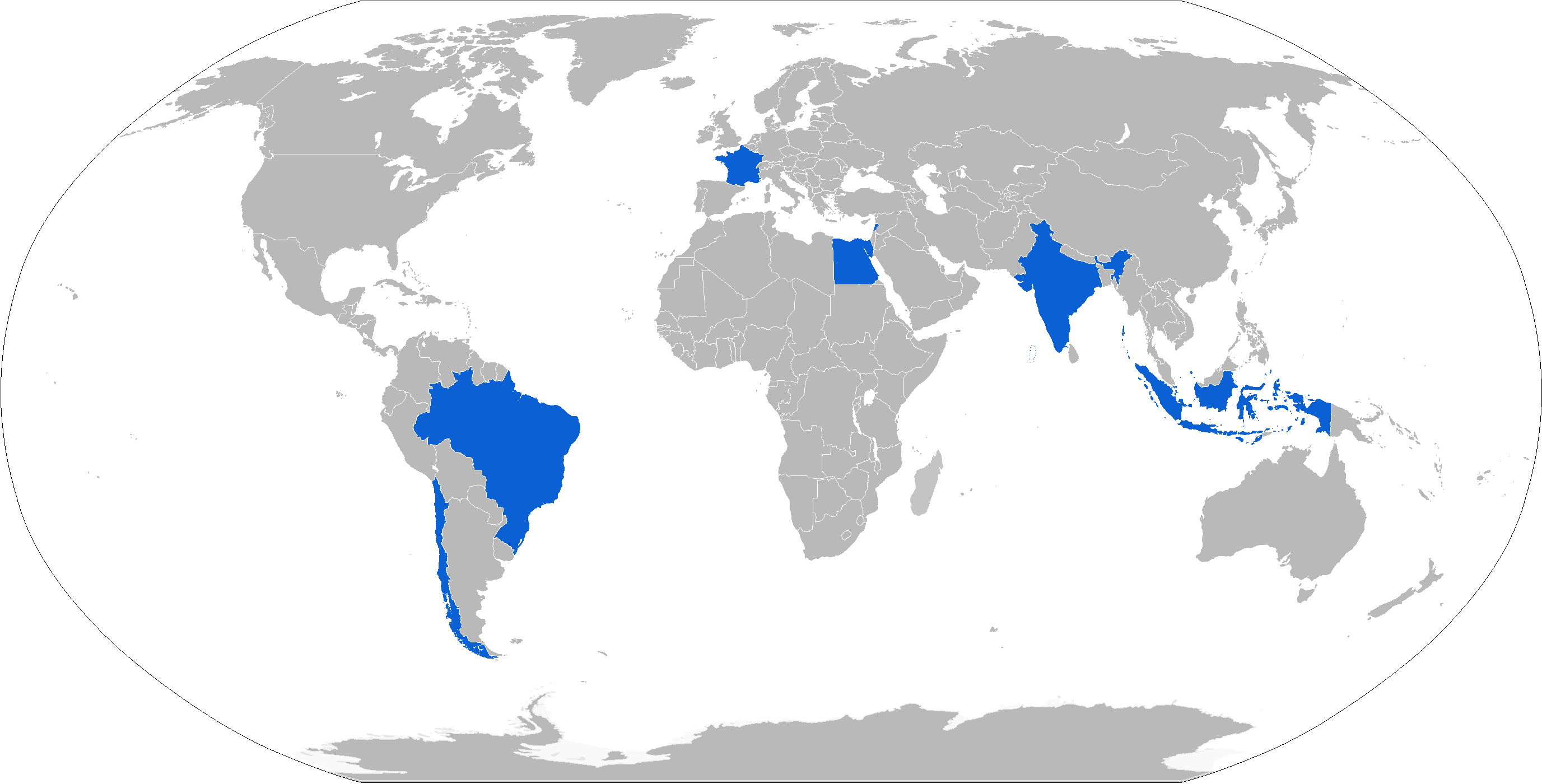
Map of Renault Sherpa 2 operators in blue

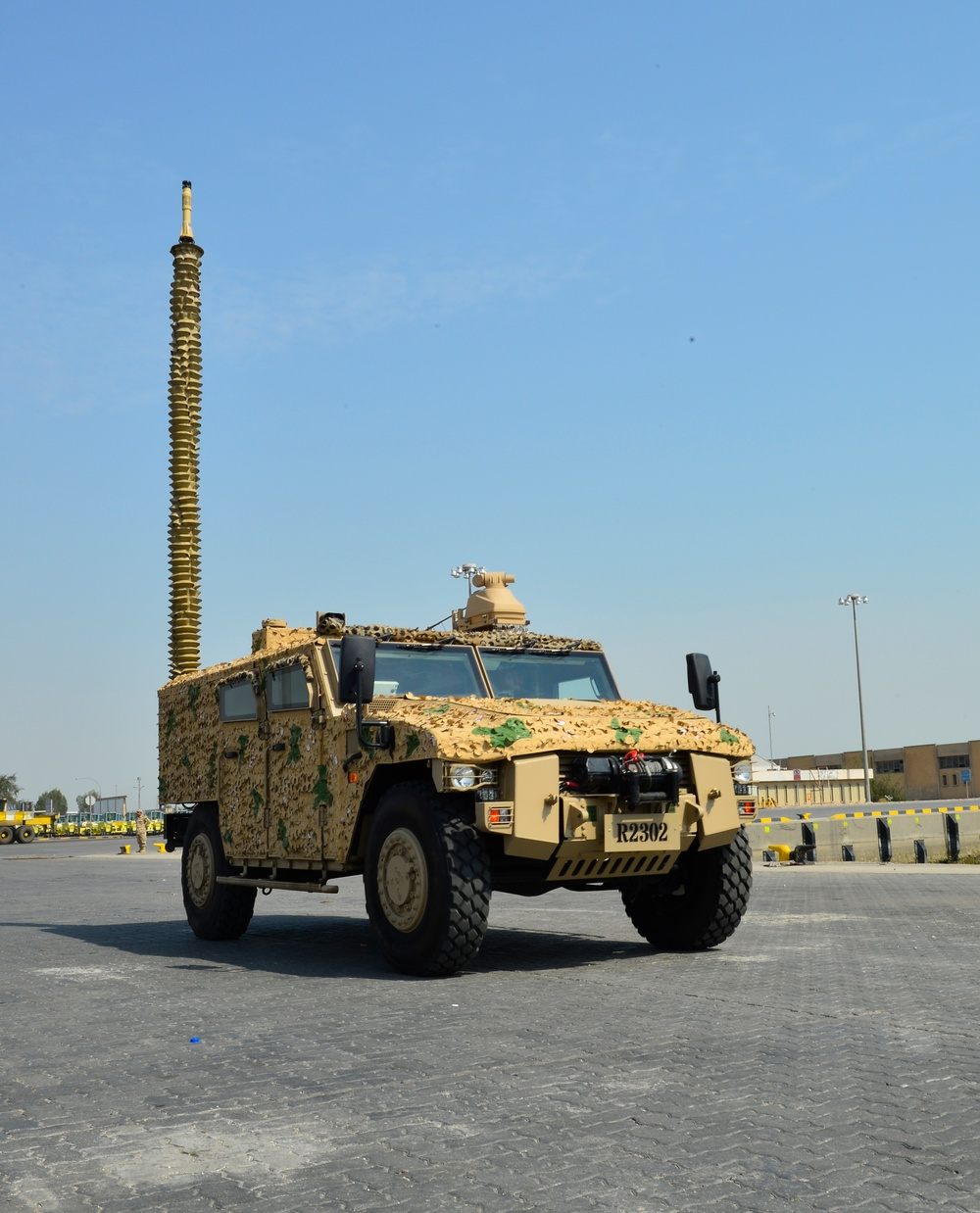
Sherpa light tactical vehicle in Kuwaiti service

- Australia: Corrections Victoria Security and Emergency Services Group (SESG) use two Mack badged vehicles for high risk prisoner transport that can accommodate up to four prisoners. The vehicles were manufactured in Australia under Volvo according to CV requirements with a contract of $AUD 900,000 for one van.
- Sherpa Light with Spike LR2 missile of the Cyprus National Guard during the October 1st parade in 2026.
  Brazil: Three Sherpa Light APCs in service with the Federal Police of Brazil for BRL5 million.
- Cyprus: Reported in July 2024 with Cyprus in talks with Arquus. Confirmed by Arquus with an order for 12 Sherpas (Station Wagon) with Akeron MP missiles.
- Chile: Used by Carabineros de Chile's GOPES, first purchased in 2014.
- Egypt: Sherpa Scout/Light Station Wagon used by both the Egyptian Army and the National Police forces, 191 vehicles ordered and delivered from 2012 to 2014. Egypt developed an Egyptian variant of the Sherpa called Temsah Sherpa.
- France: GIGN is equipped with Sherpa APCs equipped with assault ladders with 2008 vehicles in service under Gendarmerie Nationale. French special forces equipped with the PLFS – Poids Lourd des Forces Spéciales, based on the Sherpa 2 chassis. 202 PLFS vehicles first ordered in 2015.
- Ghana
- India: National Security Guard and Central Industrial Security Force.
- Indonesia: 12 Light Scouts, 6 Armoured Light Scouts, and several Weapon System Carrier/Station Wagon variants for MBDA MPCV System. It was reported in 2011 that Renault collaborated with PT Pindad to manufacture some of the Sherpas for the Indonesian military.
  - Elang made in limited quantities and only used by the 201st/202nd/203rd Mechanized Infantry Battalions.
- Kuwait: 240 Sherpas sold to Kuwait National Guard in 2015. Sherpa Scouts sold to the Kuwaiti military in 2016 under a €270 m contract.
- Kosovo
- Lebanon: Sherpa Lights used in the Lebanese military, which was part of a US$3 billion grant from Saudi Arabia.
- Mexico: The MACK Sherpa Scout is used by the Mexican Naval Infantry. It was first unveiled to the public in 2016, part of a purchase made in 2014. 15 MACK Sherpa Scouts are to be deployed with Mexican Navy forces stationed in Tamaulipas, Guerrero, Michoacán, Sinaloa and the Mexican-Guatemalan land border. The vehicles will also be used by the Mexican Navy's Unidad de Operaciones Especiaes (Special Operations Unit) and the 27th Infantry Battalion.
- Morocco: In June 2020, Morocco had a contract with Arquus for 36 Sherpas in Light Scout and APC configurations for Moroccan special forces units.
- Qatar: In 2011, an order was made for five Sherpa Light APCs for the Internal Security Forces. Another order for five more Sherpa Lights made in 2013.
- Saudi Arabia: Pressed 100 Sherpa Light vehicles into service in 2014, which was part of a $USD3 billion contract in military aid to Lebanon.

== See also ==
- The Renault Sherpa should not be confused with the Leyland Sherpa — see LDV Pilot.
