= ST-100 =

Egyptian armoured vehicle, in service 2018

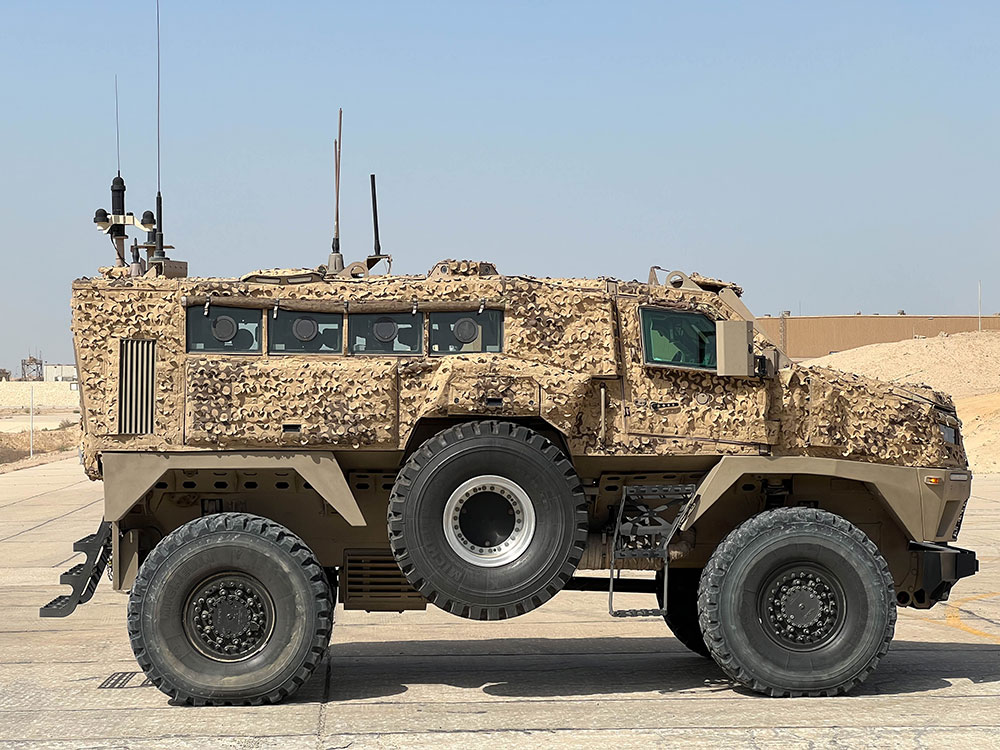
- Type: MRAP
- Place of origin: Egypt

Service history
- In service: 2018–present
- Used by: See Operators below

Production history
- Designer: IMUT
- Manufacturer: IMUT in co-operation with the Ministry of Military Production's Military Factory 200

Specifications
- Mass: 14.5 ton
- Length: 6.45 m
- Width: 2.63 m
- Height: 3.8 m
- Crew: 8 to 10 crew members
- Main armament: Can be armed with a 7.62×51mm multiple machine gun, a 12.7×99mm heavy machine gun, or a 40 mm grenade launcher, all of which can be installed on a remote-controlled weapon station.
- Engine: American-made Cummins ISL 6-cylinder diesel engine with a capacity of 8,900 cc, generating 400 horsepower at 2,100 rpm.
- Transmission: 6-speed automatic transmission, model ZF EcoLife, from the German company ZF Friedrichshafen.
- Operational range: 700 km
- Maximum speed: 115 km/h

The ST-100 is a multi-mission armored vehicle that appeared for the first time during the activities of the Military and Defense Industries Exhibition EDEX in 2018 in Cairo. It is produced at the Military Factory 200 in cooperation with the International Marathon United Technology Group (IMUT), which is a purely Egyptian company, and was previously headquartered in South Africa. Under the name SASKA, it was owned by an Egyptian businessman. The company began developing the armored vehicle in 2016, before moving to Egypt in 2018, rebranding it as IMUT, and entering into a partnership with the Egyptian Ministry of Military Production.

== Design ==
The most important feature of the vehicle is its unique design designed to combat explosive devices and mines, which takes the shape of the letter V from the bottom, which places it in the category of vehicles resistant to mines and explosive devices (MRAP), noting that it does not have a traditional chassis, but rather has a unified chassis, or what is known as a Monocoque. It is like a shell or capsule, but it is reinforced in the lower section with materials that are highly resistant to explosions, in addition to the tremendous advantage in the event that it is exposed to a high-explosive explosive device, so that the part containing the crew is separated from the rest of the armored vehicle to ensure their survival, and it can be installed on another hull without problems. In addition, the individual seats themselves are equipped with technology to absorb shocks resulting from the explosion of explosive devices and mines. It also features the ability to dismantle, install and replace the engine without any complications to facilitate maintenance or replacement work in the theater of operations. it has Anti-lock braking system and four-wheel steering system.

The length of the armored vehicle reaches 6.4 meters, its width reaches 2.6 meters, its height reaches 3.8 meters, and its total weight without a load is 14.5 tons and reaches 18 tons with a maximum load.

== Armament ==
The vehicle is equipped with a camouflage net that reduces radar and thermal signatures, in addition to having an integrated combat and protection system that can be equipped upon request:

- VPJS electronic obstruction and jamming system on various communications bands and wireless networks to neutralize remote explosive device detonation systems. It is jointly developed by IMUT and the Ministry of Military Production, with the assistance of electronic countermeasures specialists from Switzerland.
- The French Metravib PILAR V system is specialized in monitoring and identifying sources of fire through acoustic fingerprinting to direct the automatic weapon station operating by remote control to eliminate snipers and armed elements during fighting in cities and narrow areas.
- Soft-Kill Active Protection System consists of monitoring and warning sensors against laser beams and anti-armor missiles, along with thermal and electro-optical jamming means, smoke screen launchers, and an aerosol that blocks electro-optical, thermal, laser, and radar guidance capabilities, as it contains particles of red phosphorus. The burner and aluminum are covered with fiberglass as well as some brass particles (composed of 30% zinc and 70% copper).
- The vehicle can be armed with a 7.62×51mm multiple machine gun, a 12.7×99mm heavy machine gun, or a 40 mm grenade launcher, all of which can be installed on a remote-controlled weapon station. The defense system and the automatic machine gun station are controlled through the Battle digital battle management system, which can be added to armored vehicles, especially specialized combat versions, which can be armed with anti-tank missiles, anti-aircraft missiles, or mortars.
- The armored vehicle contains a set of cameras and thermal sensors to support the driver and transmit everything going on around it to the crew’s internal screens, to ensure Situational Awareness of the surrounding situation in the area of operations.

== Protection level ==
The vehicle has a high level of protection, and the level of armor protection against bullets reaches Stanag-4 if additional armor is provided, which can withstand 14.5x114 mm bullets, with the possibility of adding Anti-Blast Seats. Modern seats provide STANAG 4568 levels of protection and meet by NATO AEP-55 standards. The folding seats are wall-mounted with an advanced energy damper dampening system, a four-point safety harness and an adjustable headrest and Advanced Impact Mat shock-absorbing floor. Blast protection provides 10 kg of TNT under the hull, 10 kg under the wheel and 50 kg at a lateral distance of 50 metres. It has Level 4 protection on the front and bottom, with Level 3 protection on the side and roof. It also has Automated fire suppression systems and CEN Level SR6/SR7 armor protection for the crew compartment.

== Maneuver ==
The armored vehicle's speed reaches 115 km/h and its range reaches 700 km. The vehicle is equipped with an American-made Cummins ISL 6-cylinder diesel engine with a capacity of 8,900 cc, generating 400 horsepower at 2,100 rpm, with a 6-speed automatic transmission, model ZF EcoLife, from the German company ZF Friedrichshafen.

== Uses and variants ==
=== ST-100 ===
It appeared for the first time at the EDEX military exhibition in Cairo in December 2018, and was developed in South Africa in 2016 by SASKA, which was owned by an Egyptian businessman. The company was transferred to Egypt in 2018 and rebranded under the name IMUT in partnership with the Egyptian Army. It appeared again during the IDEX 2019 exhibition in the United Arab Emirates.

=== Details ===
4×4 armored personnel carrier, anti-ambush and anti-mine (MRAP), with a V-shaped design that distributes the impact of explosions. The number of crew members is 5, including the driver, commander, and 3 others for the patrol version, and the number reaches 8 for the attack and intervention version. There are 10 firing ports on the sides and back of the car, and there is the possibility of adding explosion-proof seats and a shock-absorbing mat. It also contains self-inflating tires and contains a group of cameras and thermal sensors to support the driver and transmit everything that is going on around it to the crew’s internal screens, to ensure cognitive awareness of the surrounding situation in the area of operations, a front screen and heavy-duty air conditioning. The ST-100 is a multi-mission vehicle that can be equipped - as needed - to carry out different types of missions, as follows:

- An armored personnel carrier for attack and intervention.
- An ambulance capable of transporting 4 individuals.
- Reconnaissance and surveillance.
- Command and control.
- An air defense unit equipped with anti-aircraft missiles/artillery.
- A tank hunting vehicle equipped with anti-tank guided missiles.
- Rocket launcher.
- Mortar carrier.
- Precision Attack Missile Carrier.
- Signal / Electronic Warfare vehicle.
- Explosive ordnance system.

== History ==
The armored vehicle is produced for the Egyptian Armed Forces, in addition to being marketed to Arab and African countries. Citing Egyptian media reports, the Egyptian army obtained ST-100 anti-ambush armored vehicles, and the deputy head of Military Factory 200 reportedly revealed the information in an interview on Egyptian television. It is not known how many vehicles will be delivered. Engineer Hassan Abdel Majeed made the announcement during a press conference at a ceremony held at the Ministry of Military Production. He pointed out that the ministry approved the Saudi request, and is preparing for testing during the month of November. He added that the Kingdom of Saudi Arabia is the second country to request the import of Egyptian-made armored vehicles after testing them in the Emirati desert last August, explaining that final export contracts are expected to be signed with the Emirati side in the coming period. Some of its models were tested for the war on terrorism in Sinai and were remarkably successful.

== Operators ==
Current operators

Egypt: The Egyptian Army expressed a particular interest in the ST-100 vehicles and requested some modifications to them before purchasing them, as they had previously passed protection tests conducted by the Egyptian Armed Forces. It is not known how many vehicles were delivered to the Egyptian army, and some modifications were required before purchasing them.

Future operators

Saudi Arabia: The Ministry of Military Production received a request from the Saudi Ministry of Defense to conduct a practical test of the ST-100 armored vehicle and its smaller model, the ST-500, in the Riyadh desert, in preparation for their import.

UAE: The UAE concluded a contract to import 1,000 armored vehicles, and the 200 Military Factory affiliated with the Ministry of Military Production received a request to carry out a practical test of the armored vehicle in the Abu Dhabi desert, in preparation for signing a final contract to export it to the UAE during August 2019.

== See also ==
- ST-500
