= ST-500 =

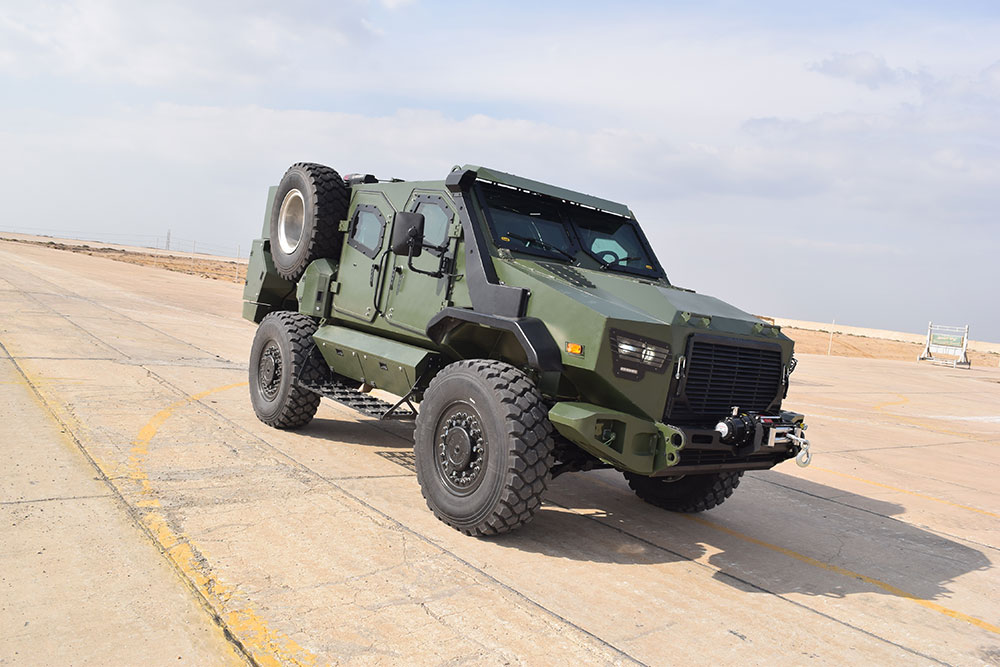
- Type: Light tactical armoured personnel carrier
- Place of origin: Egypt

Service history
- In service: 2018-present
- Used by: Egyptian Armed Forces; Saudi Arabian Army; United Arab Emirates Armed Forces

Production history
- Designer: IMUT
- Manufacturer: Military Factory 200

Specifications
- Mass: 8 ton, can carry a payload of 2.5 ton.
- Length: 5.65 m
- Width: 2.40 m
- Height: 3.15 m
- Crew: 5 to 8
- Main armament: Can be armed with a remote-controlled weapon station equipped with multi-caliber machine guns, 30 mm grenade launchers, an anti-tank missile launcher, or a mortar carrier other than smoke launchers.
- Engine: American Cummins QSB 6.7 diesel with a capacity of 6700 cc, turbocharged and generating a power of 300 hp at 2500 rpm with an American automatic transmission model Allison 3000 SP.
- Operational range: 700 km
- Maximum speed: 140 km/h

The ST-500 is a multi-mission armored vehicle that appeared for the first time during the Military and Defense Industries Exhibition EDEX 2018 in Cairo. It is produced at Military Factory 200 (armor production and repair) in cooperation with the International Marathon United Technology Group, which is a private Egyptian company. It is the younger sister of the ST-100 MRAP, and operates as a Light Tactical Vehicle (LTV) for transporting soldiers, special forces operations, or ambulances.

== Design ==
The armored hull is fully welded V-shaped steel armor providing complete protection against 7.62 mm shell attack. Comes equipped with a heavy duty air conditioner. The driver sits in front to the left and the commander sits to the right. Both sit behind large bulletproof windows, and a side door opens to the front, featuring a bulletproof window at the top. And a double back door. The troop compartment is located at the rear of the hull, where the rear door opens horizontally. In the upper part of the troop compartment there is a roof hatch equipped with a combat turret. Pedestrians sit on explosion-proof seats that can be folded on the sides. On either side of the troop compartment there are three firing pins so that the troops can use their weapons from inside, and the back door contains two firing pins. The vehicle can be equipped with optional systems such as military paint, an additional frame with a stand, a machine gun base depending on the type, and a shock-absorbing floor. Internal equipment such as night vision systems, a high-speed camera and built-in intercom systems are installed.

The length of the armored vehicle is 5.65 meters with the additional frame, its width is 2.4 meters, its height is 3.15 meters, and its total mass without a load is 8 tons. It can carry a payload of 2.50 tons.

The troop-carrying version can accommodate 3 members of the main crew, in addition to 5 other members, and the ambulance version can accommodate 3 crew members, in addition to two stretchers to carry the wounded. As for the mortar or rocket launcher version, it can accommodate 3 people.

== Armament ==
The vehicle can be armed with a remote-controlled weapon station equipped with multi-caliber machine guns, 30 mm grenade launchers, an anti-tank missile launcher, or a mortar carrier other than smoke launchers. The armament is mounted on the top of the roof which has a single hatch.

== Protection level ==
The ST-500 has the vehicle protection level against BR6/BR7 bullets, which withstands 7.62×51mm bullets in its standard and super versions. Impressive power and handling make the ST-500 equally suited to urban and off-road deployment; the vehicle offers excellent protection against both ballistic and blast threats with crew compartment protection of CEN Level SR6/SR7 armor.

== Maneuver ==
It has a maximum speed of 140 km/h and a range of up to 700 km. It is also equipped with an American Cummins QSB 6.7 diesel engine with a capacity of 6700 cc, turbocharged and generating a power of 300 horsepower at 2500 rpm with an American Allison 3000 SP automatic transmission.

== Development stages ==
Details

4x4 light tactical armored personnel carrier designed for wide missions, interior equipment such as night vision systems, high-speed camera and built-in intercom systems, heavy-duty air conditioning, comes in several variants as desired:

- Troop carrier equipped with a machine gun turret - can carry 3 members of the main crew, in addition to 5 other members.
- Ambulance - can carry a crew of 3 and 2 patients on a stretcher.
- Fire truck.
- Mortar carrier - can carry a crew of 3.
- Rocket launcher - can carry a crew of 3.

== Operators ==
- Egypt
- Iraq: Recently Iraq expressed interest in buying the ST-500.
- United Arab Emirates
- Saudi Arabia: The Saudi Ministry of Defense requested a practical test of the ST-500 armored vehicle in the Riyadh desert, in preparation for its import.

== See also ==
- ST-100
