= Walid (armored personnel carrier) =

Egyptian wheeled armored personnel carrier

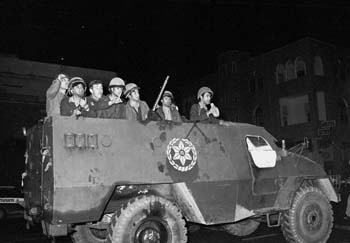
- Walid armored personnel carrier used by Israeli security forces, 1970s.
- Type: Armoured personnel carrier
- Place of origin: Soviet Union / Federation of Arab Republics / West Germany

Service history
- Used by: See operators
- Wars: Six-Day War; Angolan Civil War; Gulf War

Production history
- Designer: El Nasr Automotive Manufacturing Company
- Manufacturer: Kader Factory for Developed Industries
- Produced: late 1960s−1980s
- No. built: 1,000+

Specifications
- Mass: 9,200 kg (20,300 lb) (standard); 12,000 kg (26,000 lb) (combat)
- Length: 6.12 m (20.1 ft)
- Width: 2.57 m (8 ft 5 in)
- Height: 2.3 m (7 ft 7 in)
- Crew: 2
- Passengers: 8−10
- Armor: Steel
- Main armament: 1× 7.62 mm machine gun
- Engine: Diesel; 168 hp (125 kW)
- Payload capacity: 2,800 kg (6,200 lb)
- Drive: 4×4
- Operational range: 800 km (500 mi)
- Maximum speed: 86 km/h (53 mph) (road)

The Walid is an Egyptian wheeled armored personnel carrier (APC) with a design and role very similar to the Soviet BTR-40. It first saw combat during the Six-Day War, and also saw use by Iraqi forces during the Gulf War.

== Description ==
The Walid is an open-topped APC very similar to the BTR-40. The armor is all-welded steel with the diesel engine at the front, driver and commander sitting at the armoured cab and the troop compartment at the rear. The cab have two armoured shutters that can be lowered when necessary. The troop compartment have three observation/firing ports on each side with an extra two at the rear on either sides of the spare wheel and tire, which are carried on the door. A pintle mounted 7.62 mm machine gun is mounted at the top of the hull.

Based on a German-designed chassis built under licence from Magirus-Deutz, the Walid's armored body was built by the El Nasr Automotive Manufacturing Company while assembly was carried on by the Kader Factory for Developed Industries.

== Variants ==
- Walid 2 − An improved variant introduced in 1981 based on a Mercedes-Benz chassis.
- Minelayer − Equipped with minelaying chute attached to the troop compartment door.

== History ==
The first locally produced APC in Egypt, the Walid marked one of Egypt's first attempts at reproducing or adapting Soviet military hardware using Western technology. It was designed by civilian engineers at a Nasr Automotive facility in Helwan and modeled directly on the BTR-40, an early postwar Soviet wheeled APC. About a thousand vehicles were delivered to the Egyptian Army by the 1980s, while some vehicles were built and exported to Algeria, Sudan, North Yemen, Guinea, and Burundi. Production of the Walid continued with very little variation to the original design until 1981, when Kader began manufacturing the vehicle chassis with slightly different Mercedes-Benz truck chassis as the Walid 2. With the Fahd APC approved for production following final testing in summer 1985, production of the Walid was discontinued since then.

Egypt deployed the Walid during the Six-Day War. Small numbers were captured and pressed into service by the Israel Defense Forces (IDF) in the wake of that conflict. The Walid was replaced in front-line service with the Egyptian Army by the Kader Fahd during the 1980s. However, it continued to see active service with various paramilitary divisions of the Egyptian Ministry of Interior.

During the Gulf War, Iraq used a large variety of foreign made APCs, including Egyptian Walids.

== Operators ==
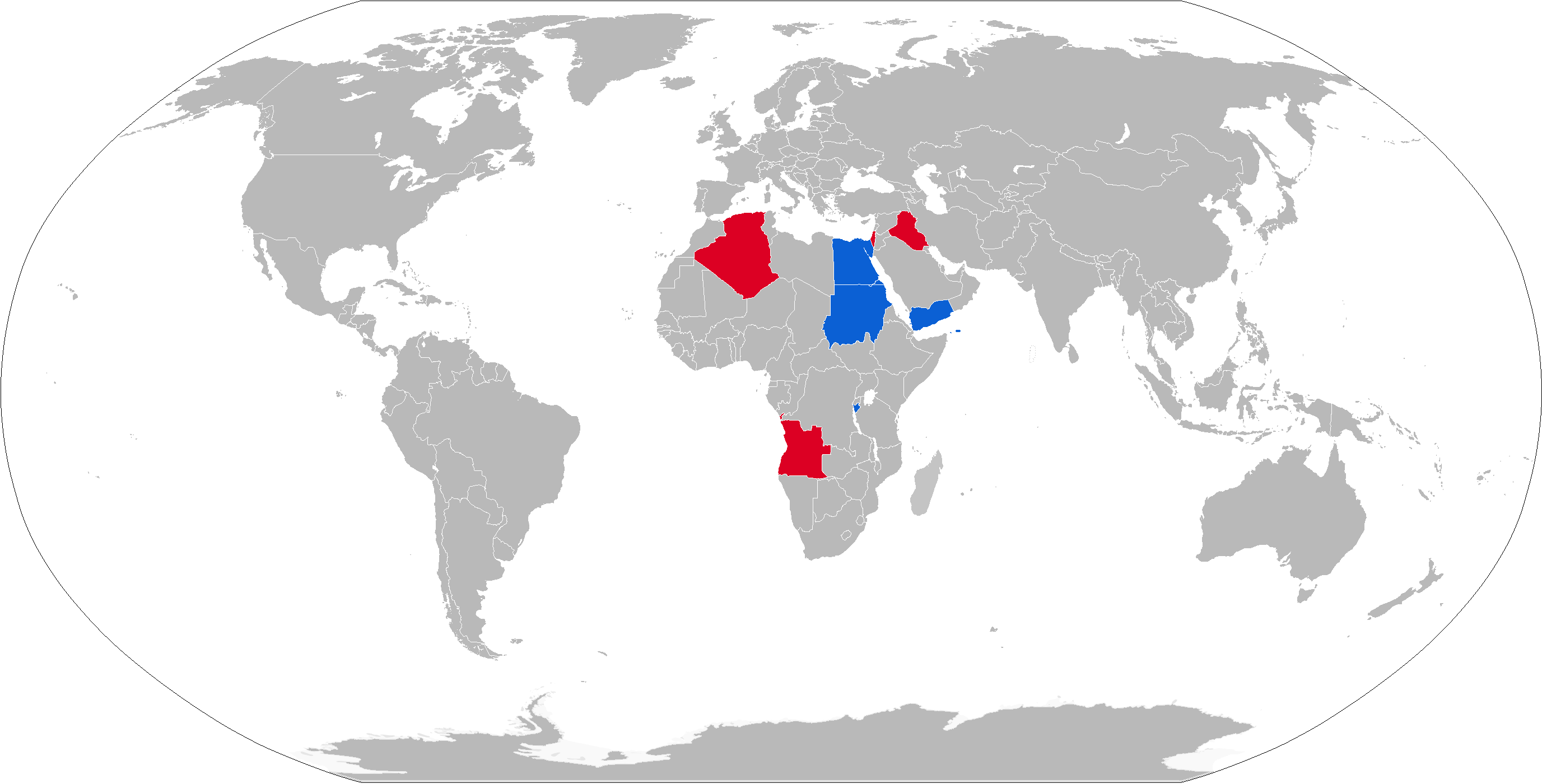
Map with Walid operators in blue and red

=== Current ===
- Burundi − Ordered in 1981 from Egypt and delivered in 1982. 6 were in service in 2024.
- Egypt − ~250 in service with the Ministry of Interior, and Central Security Forces. The Egyptian Army is also in possession of another 650 vehicles, possibly with second-line units.
- Sudan − 104 were ordered between 1981 and 1986.
- Yemen − Inherited from North Yemen.

=== Former ===
- Angola − Egyptian aid; some saw service during the Angolan Civil War, delivered in late 1975 or 1976.
- Algeria – 20 delivered in 1978.
- Guinea
- Israel − Captured from Egypt.
- Iraq – 100 were ordered in 1979 and delivered in 1980.
- North Yemen − 20 were ordered in 1974 and delivered in 1975.
- Palestine Liberation Organization

== Bibliography ==
- Foss, Christopher F, ed. (2011). Jane's armour and artillery 2011-2012 (32 ed.). Coulsdon: IHS Jane's. ISBN 978-0-7106-2960-9.
- Jacobson, Michael R. (January–February 1991). Garland, Albert N. (ed.). "Iraqi Infantry". Infantry. 81 (1). Fort Benning, GA: U.S. Army Infantry School: 33–37. ISSN 0019-9532.
- Sayigh, Yezid (1992). Arab Military Industry: Capability, Performance and Impact (1st ed.). London: Brassey's and Centre for Arab Unity Studies. ISBN 978-0-08-041777-6. OL 9266916M.
