= Kader Factory for Developed Industries =

- Company type: State-owned company
- Industry: Defence and consumer products
- Founded: 1949; 77 years ago
- Headquarters: Nasr City, Cairo, Egypt
- Area served: Egypt, Africa, Middle East, Asia, Europe
- Owner: Arab Organization for Industrialization
- Number of employees: 1,800

The Kader Factory for Developed Industries (Egyptian Arabic: مصنع قادر للصناعات المتطورة) is one of the factories affiliated with the Arab Organization for Industrialization. Established in 1949 under the name Heliopolis Aircraft Factory, its goal was to produce the “Al-Gomhouria” basic training set. In 1975, the factory became a member of the Arab Organization, under the name of Kader Factory for Developed Industries. The factory area is 135,000 square meters and employs a staff of 1,800 employees.

The factory includes about 24 production and service workshops, in addition to 30 buildings for administrations and warehouses. It is located in Al-Tayaran Street in Nasr City, Cairo.

== History ==
The factory was established in 1949. It was named Heliopolis Aircraft Factory for the purpose of designing and manufacturing the first training aircraft in Egypt and the Middle East at the time, which was called “Al-Gomhouria."

After the October War, when the late President Anwar Sadat agreed with the Arab countries to establish the Arab Organization for Industrialization in 1975, the factory was annexed to it under the name Kader Factory for Developed Industries.

In 2025, Kader for Developed Industries entered into an agreement with the Turkish defense firm HAVELSAN to jointly produce unmanned ground vehicles in Egypt. This collaboration aims to enhance Kader's production capacity while facilitating technology transfer. Under the terms of the agreement, unmanned systems will be produced at Kader’s facilities, incorporating advanced technologies such as artificial intelligence, swarm intelligence, and real-time data processing. The systems are designed for diverse military and security applications, including reconnaissance, surveillance, border protection, and logistical support, and are capable of operating across varied terrains and under challenging conditions.

== Products ==
- Fahd (armored personnel carrier)
- Walid (armored personnel carrier)
- Temsah armoured personnel carrier
- Mercedes G 320 armored vehicle (as the Kader-320)
- Additional armor for the M113
- Al-Gomhouria primary trainer aircraft equipped with communication systems and night flight navigation
- Tiger Kader-120 armoured vehicle
- Qadir-1
- Various fire trucks
- Various rescue vehicles
- Railway projects
- Automotive industry and its equipment

The factory has begun to expand into civilian products. During the Corona pandemic, the factory established a production line for masks with a capacity of 10,000 masks per day, in addition to all sterilization materials requirements.

The most important civil industry that the factory contributes to economic development is the manufacturing of widespread food trucks and their equipment.

The factory contributes to environmental protection projects, such as mobile bathrooms in tourist places and modern garbage transport vehicles.

As for agricultural equipment, the factory began producing irrigation networks that contribute to the reclamation of one and a half million acres in the New Valley, in addition to wood and plastic products.
