= Arab Organization for Industrialization =

Egyptian defense manufacturer

- Abbreviation: AOI
- Formation: 1975; 51 years ago
- Type: State-owned company
- Purpose: Defence industry Railway rolling stock industry
- Headquarters: Cairo, Egypt
- Region served: Africa, Arab world
- Official language: Egyptian Arabic
- Owner: Egypt
- Chairman: Abd El Aziz Seif-Eldeen
- Main organ: Supreme Committee
- Staff: ~16,000
- Website: www.aoi.org.eg

The Arab Organization for Industrialization (AOI) (Egyptian Arabic: الهيئة العربية للتصنيع) is an Egyptian company, it’s an Egyptian government's manufacturing arm, which reports to the Presidency. The company is considered a cornerstone of Egypt's military industry, overseeing twelve military factories that produce both civilian and military goods. Founded in 1975, AOI meets the requirements of the Egyptian military, it directs spare capacity to civilian programmes, including civilian transport and sanitation equipment; additionally, AOI has stated its intention of entering the wind power sector.

Initially an institution of Pan-Arabism, the company was established by Egypt, Saudi Arabia, United Arab Emirates and Qatar to supervise the collective development of the Arab defense industry. Following a gradual deterioration in relations between the AOI member-states, Saudi Arabia, Qatar and the United Arab Emirates returned their shares in AOI, valued at US$1.8 billion, to Egypt in 1993, leaving AOI wholly owned by Egypt. AOI employs approximately 16,000 employees, out of which 1,250 are engineers. AOI fully owns 12 factories and shares in 1 joint-venture, besides the Arab Institute for Development Technology.

== History ==
AOI was established by its four member-states - Egypt, Qatar, Saudi Arabia and the UAE - in response to the threat posed by the advanced Israeli defence industry. The initial capitalisation of AOI was USD 1 billion, contributed in equal part by the four member-states, although with the understanding AOI would be based in Egypt.

=== Westland Helicopters v. Arab Organisation for Industrialization ===
In 1978, AOI and Westland Helicopters, a British aerospace company, established the Arab British Helicopter Company as a joint venture, but a year later AOI announced the company's liquidation. In ensuing arbitration, the International Chamber of Commerce made an award, on grounds of breach of the principles of natural law and good faith, in favour of Westland Helicopters and against AOI's four member-states. This award was later annulled by the Court of Justice of Geneva, which annulment was upheld by the Swiss Federal Supreme Court, on grounds that the arbitrators had jurisdiction over AOI but not over the organisation's member-states.

=== Egyptian isolation ===
Following the signing of the Egypt-Israeli peace treaty (1979), Egypt had its membership to the Arab League suspended and a policy of economic isolation implemented against it. It was in this atmosphere that the three AOI member-states other than Egypt - Qatar, Saudi Arabia and the UAE - withdrew from the AOI, causing its collapse.

In 1983, the Egyptian chief-of-staff restated his interest in the joint manufacture of weapons, but it was only after the 1987 Arab League summit in Amman, Jordan, when the Arab League re-admitted Egypt and the other Arab states normalised relations with Egypt, that the possibility of renewed co-operation among the AOI member-states seemed possible.

The UAE seemed similarly eager to reinvigorate the AOI: in 1988, Egypt and the UAE held talks with Qatar about its re-entry into the AOI, at which an agreement for closer co-operation between Egypt and Qatar in the fields of culture and communication was signed.

== Organization ==
AOI is one of the largest industrial organisations in Egypt with significant international relationships both in the defence and civilian transport sectors. The AOI is wholly state-owned by Egypt and administered by a Supreme Committee, the chairman of which is the Egyptian president and which includes several cabinet ministers, but it is not a division of the Ministry of Military Production as the treaty upon which it was established declares the Arab Organization for Industrialization as an independent international Organisation, even though it is now only owned by Egypt but the establishing treaty stays the same, and changing it requires the consent of the establishing parties .

== Current enterprises ==
All AOI enterprises are ISO 9000/2001 and ISO 14001/2004 certified.

=== AOI Aircraft Factory ===
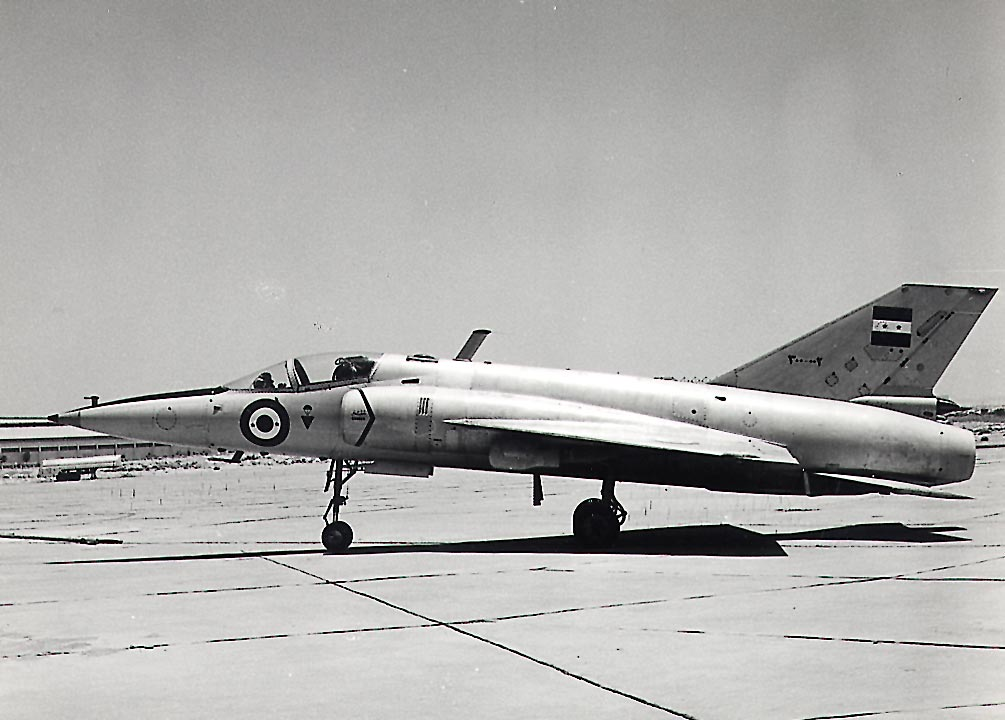
prototype Helwan HA-300 manufactured at the AOI Aircraft Factory, for which the AOI Engine Factory produced E-300 engines.

The AOI's Aircraft Factory (Arabic: مصنع الطائرات, abbreviated ACF) was established in 1950 as Helwan Aircraft Factory and is a key aerospace manufacturer in Egypt. It is located in Helwan.

The AOI Aircraft Factory manufactures and assembles aircraft for the Egyptian air force, including:

- Helwan HA-200 Al Kahirah subsonic trainer
- Prototype Helwan HA-300 supersonic fighter
- Alpha Jet
- Tucano turboprop trainer
- FA 50 light combat aircraft
- the K-8E jet trainer.

The K-8E is an Egyptian variant of the Chinese Hongdu JL-8, exported as the Karakorum-8 (or K-8) to (among others) Pakistan, Zambia and Myanmar. The K-8E's manufacture at the AOI Aircraft Factory began in 2000, under an agreement between the AOI and CATIC, the Chinese state-owned aerospace manufacturer, to produce a total of 60 K-8s over five years. The contract, valued at US$347.4 million, was signed in 1999 in connection with the state visit by Chinese president Jiang Zemin that year. Initially, most of the parts were manufactured in China and the aircraft were assembled in Egypt, but by the end of the programme the manufacture was to be carried out entirely at the AOI Aircraft Factory. In the end, 98% of each K-8E was locally manufactured.

The AOI Aircraft Factory also manufactures aircraft parts for the Egyptian Civil Aviation Authority (ECAA), Dassault Aviation and SAGEM, and has received certification from the ECAA for its welding, painting, testing and calibration operations. The AOI Aircraft Factory also engages in civilian and technological projects.

=== AOI Engine Factory ===
In 1960, the Engine Factory (Arabic: مصنع المحركات) was established by the Egyptian military with German technical assistance as a base to design, develop and produce aircraft engines. The first engines produced at the Engine Factory were:

- the E-200 for the Helwan HA-200 Al Kahirah subsonic trainer; and
- the E-300 for the Helwan HA-300 supersonic fighter.

In 1975, the Engine Factory was affiliated to AOI, since when it has focused its activities on the manufacture, assembly, repair and overhaul of gas turbines and accessories. The AOI Engine Factory has established maintenance facilities for auxiliary power units and SNECMA Atar 09C, T56, CT64, PT6-25 and -64, Larzac 04, R-13 and R-25 engines.

The AOI Engine Factory directs spare capacity to civilian projects, including the manufacture of fuel injectors for Robert Bosch GmbH, air brake systems for Knorr-Bremse and rail fastening clips for Pandrol.

=== Major products ===
Compatible ordnance for BM-21 Grad, D-30 and M-46 artillery systems, M60 tanks, 85 mm divisional gun D-44, and ZSU-23-2 anti-aircraft guns.

M60 tanks and M1A1 Abrams assembly from knockdown kits

M60 and M1A1 Abrams engines and spare parts

Misr assault rifle and AK 47 complete manufacture (7,000 assault rifles a year), compatible ammunition

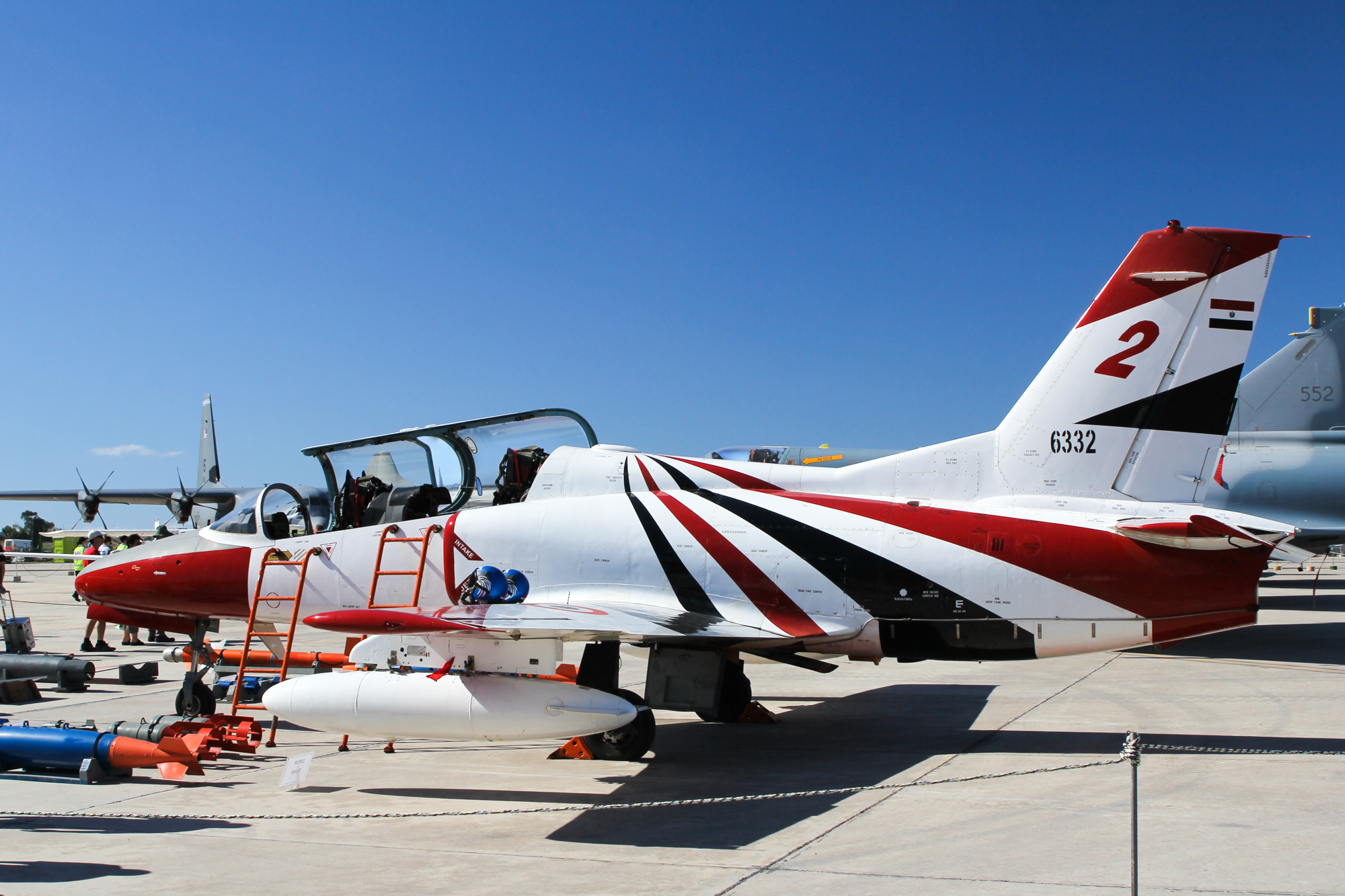
Egyptian Air Force K-8E on display at the 2015 Malta International Airshow

=== Other factories and enterprises ===
- AOI Electronics Factory
- Sakr Factory for Development Industries (AOI)
- Kader Factory for Development Industries (AOI)
- Arab British Engine Co. (ABECO) (AOI)
- Arab British Dynamics Co. ABD (AOI)
- Arab American Vehicle (AAV)
- Egyptian Railways Equipment (SEMAF (ARE))

== Bibliography ==
- YEZID SAYIGH, OWNERS OF THE REPUBLIC: AN ANATOMY OF EGYPT’S MILITARY ECONOMY, Jan. 1, 2019, Carnegie Endowment for International Peace, https://www.jstor.org/stable/resrep26922.
- Cordesman, Anthony H. (2002). Peace and war: the Arab-Israeli military balance enters the twenty-first century. Westport, Connecticut: Praeger Publishers. ISBN 978-0-275-96939-4.
- German, Richard; Taylor, Elizabeth (2004). "Egypt: economy". In Dean, Lucy (ed.). The Middle East and North Africa (50 ed.). London: Europa Publications. ISBN 978-1-85743-184-1.
- Klabbers, Jan (2002). An introduction to international institutional law. Cambridge: Cambridge University Press. ISBN 0-521-81774-9.
- Nolan, Janne E. (1992). "Worldwide threats and implications for the U.S. force structure: the Middle East and South Asia". Worldwide military threats: implications for U.S. forces. DIANE. ISBN 9780941375665.
- Rabi, Ubi (1990). "Qatar". In Ayalon, Ami; Shaked, Haim (eds.). Middle East contemporary survey. Vol. XII 1988. Boulder, Colorado: Westview Press, Inc. ISBN 978-0-8133-1044-2.
- Shidlo, Gil (1993). "Third World arms exports to Iraq before and after the Gulf War". In Barzilai, Gad; Klieman, Aharon; Shidlo, Gil (eds.). The Gulf crisis and its global aftermath. London: Routledge. ISBN 978-0-415-08002-6.
