= Egypt Defence Expo =

Defense expo in Egypt

Egypt Defence Expo (EDEX)
- Genre: Defense exhibition
- Venue: Egypt International Exhibition Center
- Location: New Cairo
- Country: Egypt
- Inaugurated: December 3, 2018
- Next event: 1–4 December 2025
- Attendance: 34,000 (2021)
- Organizer: Arabian World Events in coordination with the Egyptian Armed Forces and Ministry of Military Production
- Website: egyptdefenceexpo.com

Egypt Defence Expo (EDEX) is an international defense exhibition held biennially in Egypt, showcasing advancements in air, land, and sea military technologies. EDEX is organized by Arabian World Events in partnership with the Egyptian Armed Forces and the Ministry of Military Production.

== Announcement ==
In December 2017, the Egyptian Armed Forces announced the hosting of an international defense exhibition for 2018 under the patronage of Abdel Fattah El Sisi, the President of Egypt and Supreme Commander of the Egyptian Armed Forces. This event was named Egypt Defence Expo (EDEX).

== Venue ==
EDEX takes place at the Egypt International Exhibition Center, established in New Cairo in October 2017.

== EDEX 2018 ==
The inaugural Egypt Defence Expo took place from 3 to 5 December 2018. It featured participation from over 350 international defense and security manufacturers representing more than 40 countries. The exhibition attracted over 30,000 visitors during the three-day event. EDEX 2018 also hosted an international military VIP Delegation Program.

== EDEX 2021 ==
Originally scheduled for 2020, the second edition of EDEX was postponed to 2021 due to the COVID-19 pandemic. EDEX 2021 took place from 29 November to 2 December 2021 at the Egypt International Exhibition Centre (EIEC) in New Cairo. The event featured 407 exhibiting companies and drew over 34,000 visitors.

== EDEX 2023 ==
The third edition of EDEX was held from 4 to 7 December 2023 at the Egypt International Exhibition Centre (EIEC) in New Cairo.

== EDEX 2025 ==
The fourth edition of EDEX is scheduled to be held from 1 to 4 December 2025 at the Egypt International Exhibition Centre (EIEC) in Cairo. Over 400 exhibitors are planned to feature the exhibit, with an expected attendance of "35,000 military and industry visitors from across the world".
