= Military industry of Egypt =

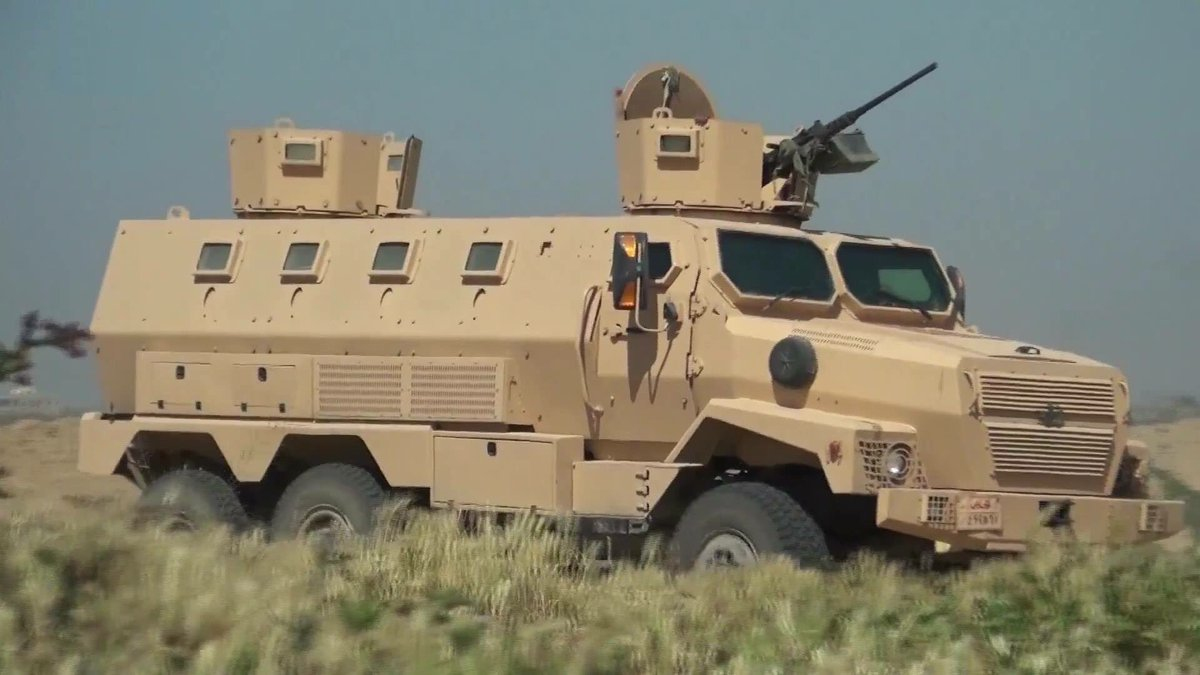
Temsah 2, an MRAP produced by Kader for Developed Industries

The military industry of Egypt produces defense and security equipment for the Egyptian Armed Forces and exports some of it abroad. Egypt has co-production agreements with several countries, including the United States, France, Germany, Russia, China and South Korea.

Egypt has invested in its domestic defense industry for decades, producing small arms, ammunitions, armored vehicles, drones, naval vessels, electronic equipment, tanks, and missiles. It has also partnered with manufacturers in the United States, Russia, China, South Africa, France, the United Kingdom, and Finland to develop and produce tank guns, howitzers, anti-aircraft mortar shells, communications equipment, and optics.

== Overview ==
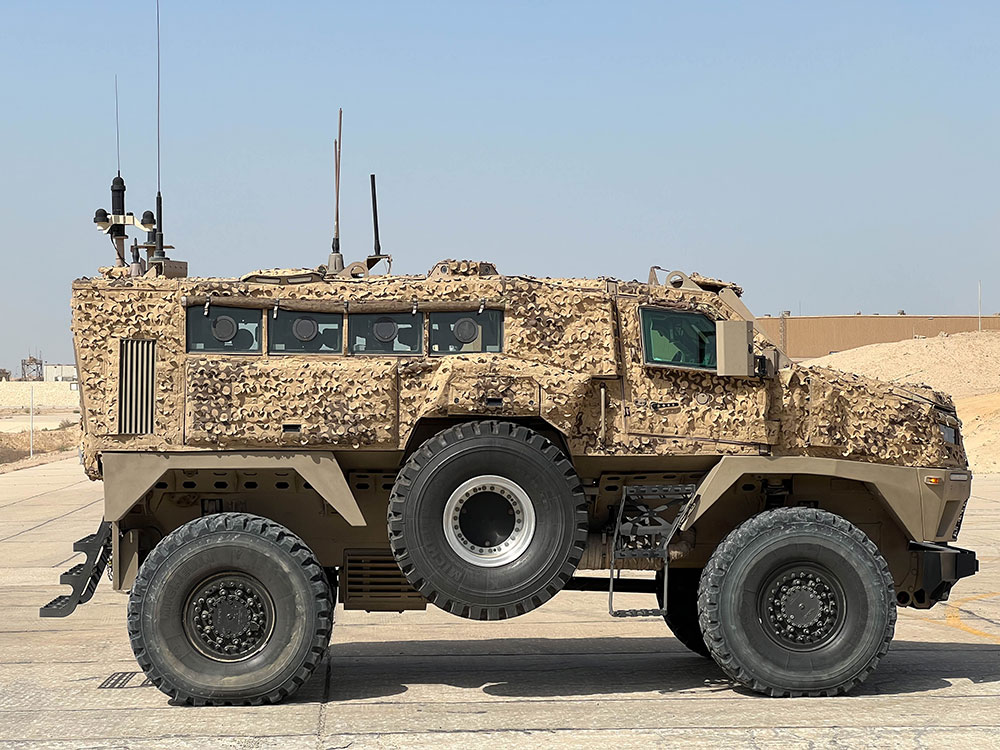
ST-100, a multi-mission armoured personnel carrier developed by IMUT and produced by the Armoured Production and Repair Factory

Egypt's defense sector has two aims: self-sufficiency and military readiness. It is built to sustain an armed force of up to 1.2 million personnel in times of mobilization.

The Ministry of Military Production oversees a network of military factories and companies, including Abu Zaabal Specialized Industries, which produces ammunition and small arms, and Abu Zaabal Engineering Industries, which manufactures artillery systems and shells. The Armoured Production and Repair Factory assembles and maintains armored vehicles such as the M1A1 Abrams and K9A1EGY, and develops indigenous platforms like the RAAD 200 and Sinai 200. In electronics, the Thales & Benha Electronics S.A.E. joint venture between France’s Thales Group and Benha Electronics co-produces communication and signaling systems, and also does research, development, and training.

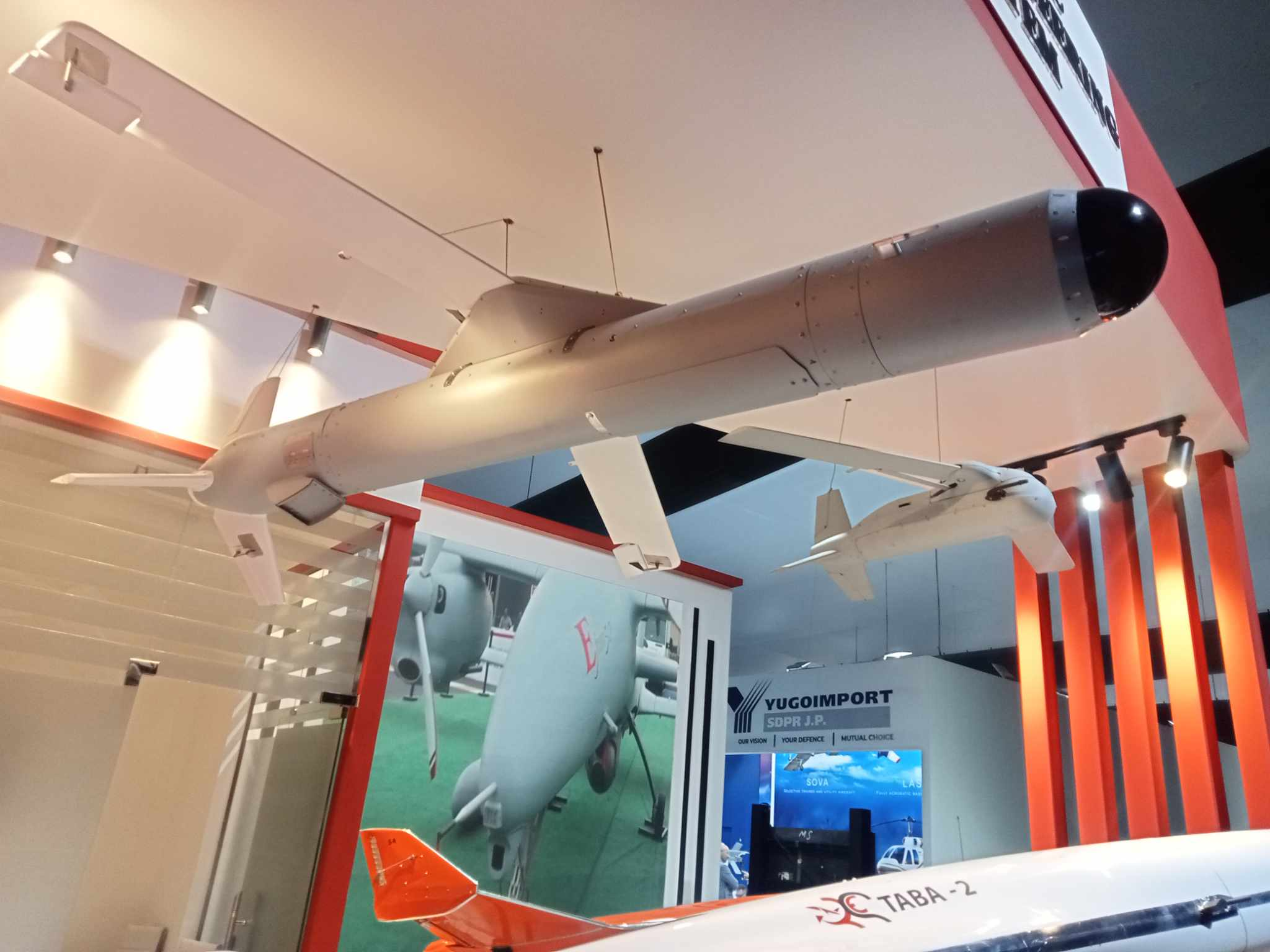
LR 155 GPK, a guided air-to-surface missile developed by Robotics Engineering Systems

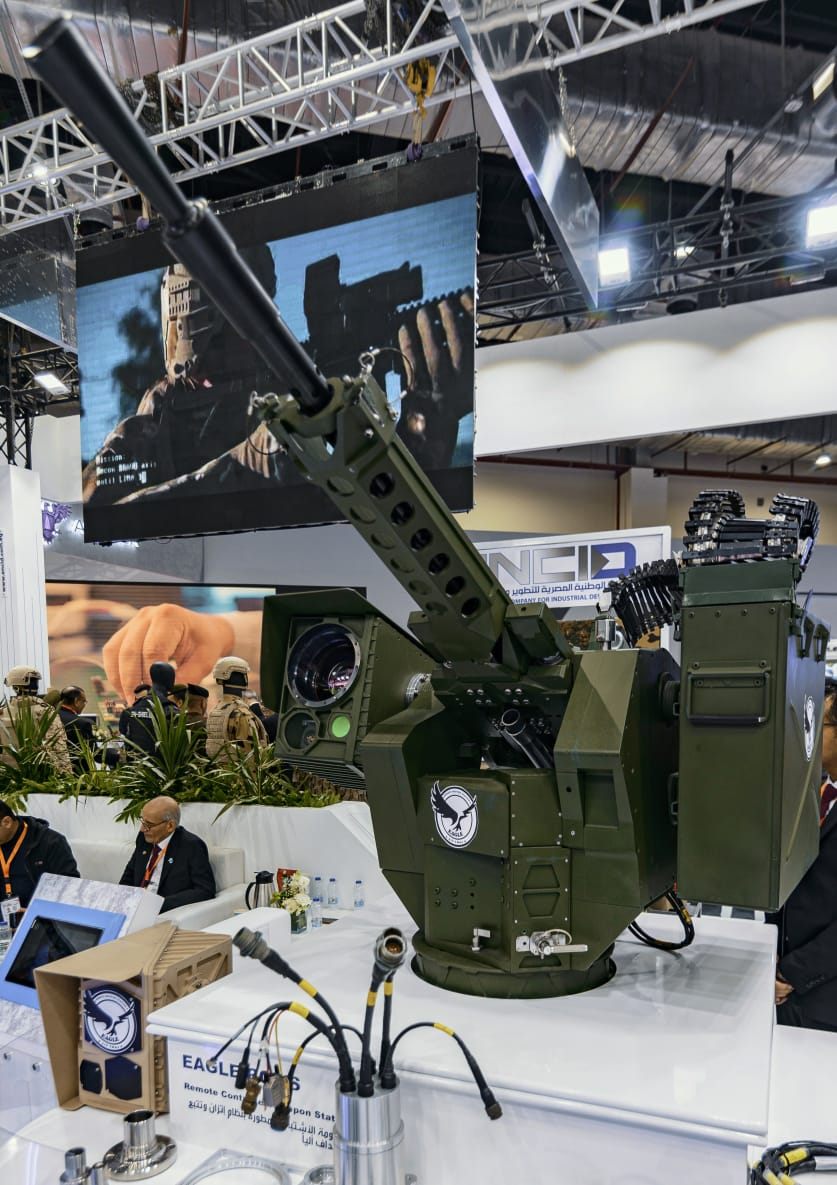
Eagle 1, a remote controlled weapon station developed by Arab International Optronics

The Arab Organization for Industrialization (AOI), a state-owned defense conglomerate, oversees enterprises in aerospace, electronics, vehicles, and armaments. It owns Kader for Developed Industries, which designs and manufactures armored vehicles, and Sakr for Developed Industries, a producer of missiles and rockets. AOI also runs joint ventures such as Arab British Dynamics Co., which makes guided weapons, and Arab American Vehicles Co., which assembles military and civilian vehicles. AOI has built aircraft for decades. Its facilities in Helwan produce licensed light combat and trainer aircraft, including the Alpha Jet and K-8E, which it now wants to replace with the KAI T-50 Golden Eagle.

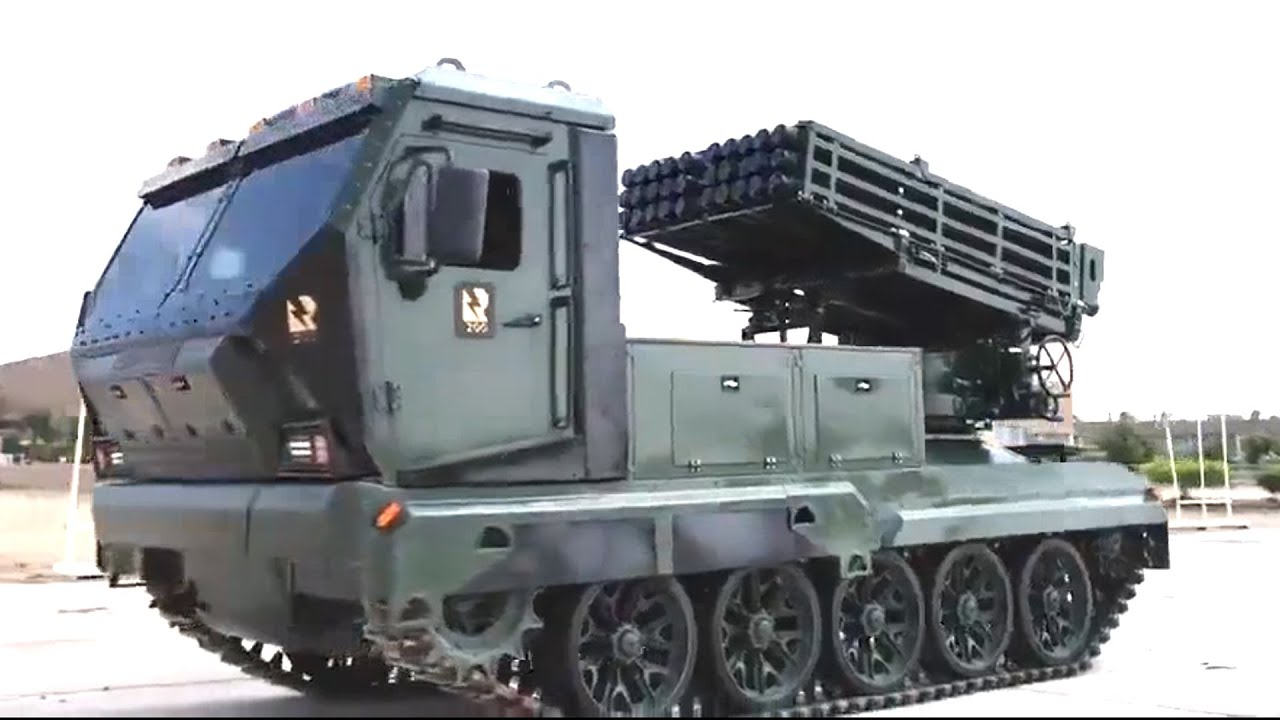
RAAD 200, a 122 mm multiple rocket launcher developed by the Armoured Production and Repair Factory

The Alexandria Shipyard leads naval production. It builds frigates, corvettes, and patrol boats. The shipyard has partnered with France’s Naval Group to produce Gowind 2500 corvettes and Germany’s ThyssenKrupp Marine Systems to locally manufacture MEKO A200 frigates for the Egyptian Navy.

Egypt’s defense industry has seen an increased involvement of private companies in recent years. Robotics Engineering Systems develops unmanned aerial vehicles (UAVs), including combat drones, surveillance systems, and smart munitions such as glide bombs and guided missiles with multi-mode guidance. Amstone, another Egyptian private defense company, works on fifth-generation defense technology, mainly naval and aerial unmanned systems.

Egypt and Turkey have expanded defense and industrial cooperation since 2023, after years of strained relations. In March 2025, Turkey’s defense firm Havelsan and Egypt’s Kader Factory for Developed Industries signed an agreement to jointly produce unmanned ground vehicles in Egypt. The partnership, supported by the Arab Organization for Industrialization, includes technology transfer and the joint design of vehicles adapted to regional conditions. In August 2025 the two companies also agreed to jointly produce the Torgha VTOL UAV in Egypt.

Later that same month, Egypt joined Turkey's TAI TF Kaan fifth-generation stealth fighter program. It is the first African country to take part in developing a fifth-generation combat aircraft. The partnership provides for technology transfer, local production, and plans to integrate the Kaan into the Egyptian Air Force.

== History ==
Egypt's military industry dates back to the early 19th century under Muhammad Ali, who established an industrial base mainly to build a modern military. Factories in Cairo made muskets and cannons. He also built a shipyard in Alexandria to build a domestic navy. By the late 1830s, Egypt's military industries had produced nine 100-gun warships and were manufacturing 1,600 muskets per month.

Near the end of World War II, Egypt acquired large and varied stocks of armaments left behind by Nazi Germany, including large stockpiles of 8mm Mauser ammunition that had been manufactured by several Axis countries. The Egyptian government decided to manufacture a semi-automatic battle rifle and purchased the tooling and plans for the Swedish Automatgevär m/42 (Ag m/42) rifle, and re-engineered it to use the 8mm Mauser cartridges and a gas adjustment valve. The resulting Hakim Rifle was manufactured and fielded from the early 1950s until c. 1961. Egypt also briefly manufactured another re-engineered Ag ms/42, chambered for the 7.62×39mm Soviet cartridge, called the Rasheed Carbine. These guns were replaced in the 1960s by the Maadi AK-47, a licensed copy of the AK-47.

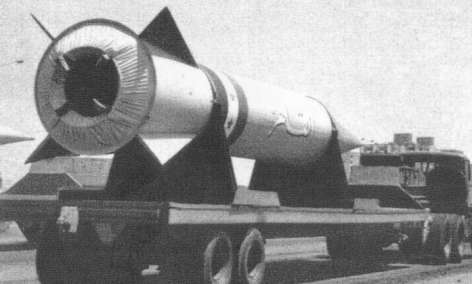
An Egyptian Al Kaher-3 missile

Egypt’s modern defense industry took shape under President Gamal Abdel Nasser in the 1950s and 1960s, during the conflict with Israel and a broader push for economic nationalism and import-substituting industrialization. Nasser’s government wanted a self-sufficient military-industrial base that would cut reliance on foreign arms suppliers and strengthen Egypt’s economic and strategic position.

During the late 1950s, Egypt built the Jabal Hamzah ballistic missile test and launch facility to test-fire and to experiment with the domestically built Al Zafir and Al Kaher SRBMs.

In the 1980s Egypt mainly produced small and medium weapons, often under foreign licenses. By the 1990s, it had entered the heavy weapons sector, manufacturing tanks and howitzers. After 2000 it moved into weapons system design, producing indigenous hardware and upgrading existing systems. In 2008, Egypt’s military production was valued at 3.8 billion Egyptian pounds ($717 million), a 20% increase over the previous year. Egypt has worked with Spain and Germany since the mid-20th century, and still buys arms and equipment from the United States and Russia.

In 2020, Egypt launched a three-year weapons manufacturing strategy aimed at achieving self-sufficiency and expanding arms exports. The initiative, backed by a $479 million investment, focused on modernizing and adding 84 production lines. The aim was to depend less on foreign suppliers and to make Egypt a regional defense exporter.

=== The Egyptian Interceptor Project ===
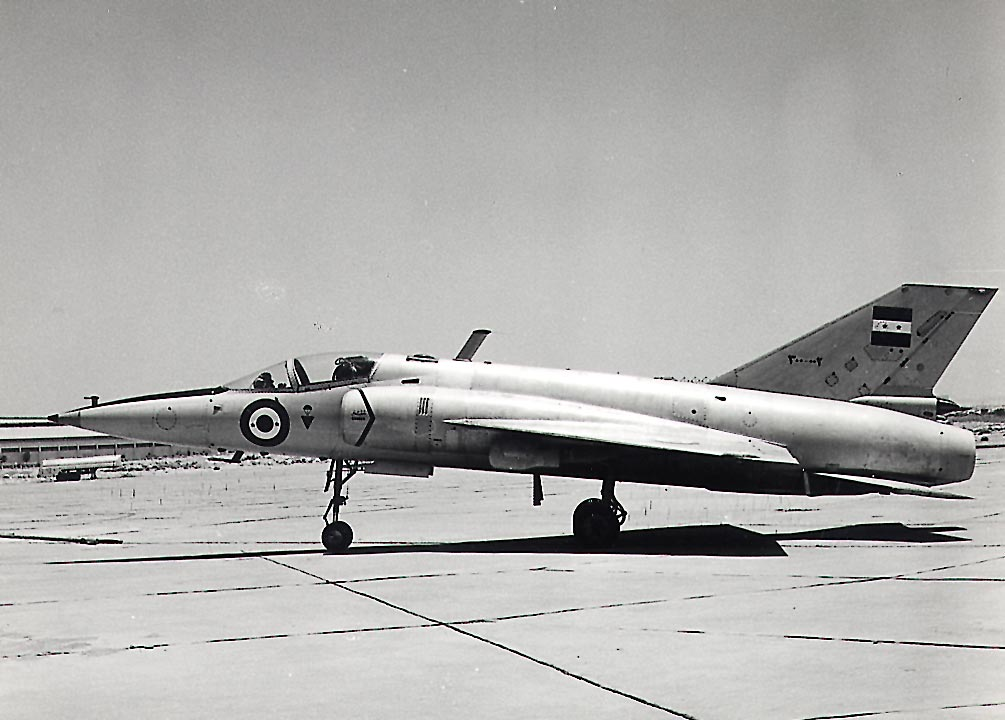
Egyptian aircraft HA-300 in Helwan

The Helwan HA-300 (Arabic: حلوان ٣٠٠) was a supersonic jet fighter project developed by Egypt in the 1960s, part of an effort to build an independent military aviation industry. Designed by Willy Messerschmitt, the HA-300 was intended as a lightweight interceptor capable of over Mach 2. It had a delta wing and was powered by the Brandner E-300 turbojet engine, an Egyptian design. Three prototypes were built and flight tests began in 1964, but the program ran into technical problems and rising costs. Egypt abandoned the project in 1969 and bought Soviet aircraft instead, including the MiG-21. It remains Egypt’s only attempt at a domestically designed jet fighter.

=== Supplying the CIA ===
Egypt was involved in supplying the Central Intelligence Agency with various weapons for Operation Cyclone during the Soviet–Afghan War. CIA Officer Gust Avrakotos set up a deal with Egyptian Defense Minister Abd al-Halim Abu Ghazala for Egypt to manufacture .303 ammunition for the hundreds of thousands of Lee–Enfield rifles that it supplied to the Afghan mujahideen through Pakistan's Inter Services Intelligence. Congressman Charlie Wilson helped lower political barriers for the deals to go through.

== Egypt Defence Expo ==
The Egypt Defence Expo (EDEX) was launched in 2018 as Egypt’s first international defense exhibition, meant to promote the country’s military industry and its position as a regional hub for defense technology and trade. It is held in Cairo every two years and draws foreign defense manufacturers as well as Egyptian state-owned and private firms. Egyptian firms use it to show domestically produced equipment and to find foreign partners. Exhibits cover arms production, aerospace, naval systems, and electronic warfare.

== Major entities ==
Entity	Type	Ref.
Alexandria Shipyard	State-owned enterprise	
ACME SAICO	Private company	
Arab International Optronics	State-owned enterprise	
Arab Organization for Industrialization (AOI)	State-owned enterprise	
AOI Aircraft Factory	State-owned enterprise	
AOI Electronics Factory	State-owned enterprise	
AOI Engine Factory	State-owned enterprise	
Arab American Vehicle Company	Joint public-private venture	
Arab British Dynamics Company	Joint public-private venture	
Arab British Engine Company	Joint public-private venture	
Arab British Helicopter Company	Joint public-private venture	
Kader Factory for Developed Industries	State-owned enterprise	
Sakr for Developed Industries	State-owned enterprise	
Amstone	Private company	
Eagles International for Defense Systems	Private company	
Egyptian Armaments Authority	Government body	
Egyptian National Company for Industrial Development (ENCID)	State-owned enterprise	
Engineering Industrial Complex	State-owned enterprise	
International Marathon United Technology (IMUT)	Private company	
Robotics Engineering Systems	Private company	
National Authority for Military Production	Government body	
Abu Qir Engineering Industries	State-owned enterprise	
Abu Zaabal Engineering Industries	State-owned enterprise	
Abu Zaabal Specialized Chemicals	State-owned enterprise	
Abu Zaabal Specialized Industries	State-owned enterprise	
Al-Maasara Engineering Industries	State-owned enterprise	
Armoured Production and Repair Factory	State-owned enterprise	
Benha Electronics	State-owned enterprise	
Thales & Benha Electronics	Joint public-private venture	
Heliopolis Chemical Industries	State-owned enterprise	
Helwan Castings	State-owned enterprise	
Helwan Diesel Engines	State-owned enterprise	
Helwan Engineering Industries	State-owned enterprise	
Helwan Machinery and Equipment	State-owned enterprise	
Helwan Metal Hardware	State-owned enterprise	
Helwan Non-Ferrous Industries	State-owned enterprise	
Military Production Co. for Engineering Projects & Consultation	State-owned enterprise	
Qaha Chemical Industries	State-owned enterprise	
Shubra Engineering Industries	State-owned enterprise	
National Authority for Remote Sensing and Space Sciences (NARSS)	Government body	
Tornex	Private company	

== See also ==
- Egyptian Armed Forces
- Ministry of Defense (Egypt)
  - National Service Products Organization
- Ministry of Military Production
- Military Technical College (Egypt)
- Arab Organization for Industrialization
