= List of state-owned enterprises in Egypt =

In 1952 Egypt's private sector accounted for 76 percent of economic investment. Following the nationalization plans carried out by President Gamal Abdel Nasser in the effort to build a post-independence socialist state, this percentage drastically shifted within a few decades to government investment accounting for over 80 percent of economic investment. This figure included all banking, insurance, foreign trade, medium and heavy industry air transport, and public utilities, as well as many retail stores, newspapers, maritime transport, construction companies, and large infrastructure assets.

By the late 1970s, president Sadat shifted Egypt to the Infitah, or an 'open door' liberal policy. However, despite a number of rounds of privatisation stipulated by the IMF and World Bank Economic Reform and Structural Adjustment Program (ERSAP) in the 1990s, that saw over 400 companies privatized, by 2015 there were 52 economic authorities, 102 service authorities, and 146 state-owned enterprises that were affiliated with nine holding companies. 30 Service authorities depend on recapitalization or operate on a subsidized business model. SOEs either are under specific ministries or are companies wholly or majority controlled by the state and operating under the authority of line ministries. These are mainly companies considered “strategic" in sectors such as electricity, aviation, banks, housing, petroleum, agriculture, textile, chemical industry, mining industry, transport, construction, tourism, pharmaceutical, and food processing holdings. In December 2024, Egyptian authorities agreed to accelerate the divestment of state-owned companies to secure a $1.2 billion package from the IMF to improve macroeconomic stability.

The following is a list of key state-owned enterprises in Egypt, and a number of their subsidiaries.

== Transportation ==
- Egyptian Holding Company for Airports and Air Navigation (EHCAAN)
  - National Air Navigation Services Company (NANSC)
  - Cairo Airport Company (CAC)
  - Egyptian Airports Company (EAC)
  - Aviation Information Technology (AVIT)
- Egyptair Holding Company
  - Egyptair
  - Egyptair Duty Free
  - Egyptair Maintenance & Engineering
  - Egyptair Ground Services
  - Egyptair In-flight Services
  - Egyptair Medical Services
  - Egyptair Supplementary Industries
  - Egyptair Cargo
- Egyptian National Railways (ENR)
- Suez Canal Authority
  - Suez shipyard
- Marine Industries and Services Organization (MIASO)
  - Alexandria Shipyard
  - Egyptian Ship Repair & Building Co.
  - National Nile Company for River Transportation
- Superjet Lines

== Media & communication ==
- Egypt Post
- National Media Authority (former ERTU)
  - Egyptian Media Production City Co SAE (Listed, government controlled: c. 80%)
  - Sono Cairo
  - Egyptian Satellites Co SAE - Nilesat (Listed, government controlled: c. 83%)
  - Nile Radio Network
  - Nile Television Network
- Telecom Egypt (Listed, government controlled: 70%)
  - Telecom Egypt - France (100.00%)
  - Telecom Egypt Data SAE (99.99%)
  - TE Investment Holding (99.99%)
  - Egyptian International Submarine Cables Co (99.00%)
  - TE for Sports Investment (98.00%)
  - Egyptian Telecommunication Co for Information Systems (97.66%)
  - Centra Technologies (58.67%)
  - Wataneya for Telecommunications (50.00%)
  - Middle East Radio Communications (49.00%)
  - Vodafone Egypt Telecommunications (44.95%)
  - Egyptian Company for Digital Signature and Information Security SAE (35.71%)
  - Matrix for Advanced Technology and Integrated Solutions (25.50%)

== Petroleum, chemicals & mining ==
- Egyptian General Petroleum Corporation (EGPC)
- South Valley Egyptian petroleum Holding Company
- Egyptian Natural Gas Holding Company (EGAS)
  - Egyptian Natural Gas Company (GASCO)
  - Egypt Gas (Listed, 83% controlled by EGAS)
- Egyptian Company for Mineral Resources
- Holding Company for Chemical Industries
- Egyptian Petrochemicals Holding company - ECHEM

== Contracting & real Estate ==
=== Affiliated to the Ministry of Housing ===
- New Urban Communities Authority (NUCA)
  - City Edge Developments (84%)
  - Hyde Park Developments (78%)
  - Saudi Egyptian Developers (50%)
  - Administrative Capital for Urban Development - ACUD (49% NUCA, 25.5% NSPO, 25.5% AFLPA)
- Arab Contractors

=== Affiliated to the Ministry of the Public Business Sector ===
- Holding Company for Construction and Development (HCCD)
  - El Nasr Housing and Development
  - Maadi Co. for Development and Reconstruction
  - Nasr General Contracting Co.(Hassan Allam)
  - Misr Concrete Development Co.
  - High Dam Electrical & Industrial Projects Co. (HIDELECO)
  - Societe Egyptienne D’entreprises (Moukhtar Ibrahim)
  - The Egyptian Contracting Co. (El Abd)
  - Heliopolis Co. For Housing and Development (Listed: 73%)
  - Al Shams Housing and Urbanization (Listed: 44.54%)
  - Zahraa Maadi Investment and Development - ZMID (Listed: 47.5% direct and indirect)

=== Affiliated to other public agencies ===
- MIDAR - formerly Mostakbal City for Urban Development
- Maspero for Urban Development

== Financial & insurance ==
- National Bank of Egypt
- Banque Misr
- Banque du Caire
- Alexbank (Listed, mostly private)
- Housing and Development Bank (Listed, controlled by Ministry of Housing)
- Export Development Bank
- Egyptian Exchange
- Egyptian Commodities Exchange
- Agricultural Bank of Egypt
- Misr Insurance Holding Company (The Sovereign Fund of Egypt)
  - Misr Insurance Company
  - Misr Life Insurance Company
  - Misr Real Estate Assets

== Pharmaceuticals ==
=== Affiliated to the Ministry of the Public Business Sector ===
- Holding Company for Pharmaceuticals (Holdipharma)
  - Arab Drug Co.
  - Chemical Industries Development Co. (CID)
  - El Nasr pharmaceutical chemicals Co.
  - Misr Co. for Pharmaceutical Products
  - The Nile Co . for Pharmaceuticals & Chemical Industries
  - Medical Appliances & Packages Co
  - Alexandria Co. for Pharmaceutical
  - Holdipharma For Marketing & Export Co.
  - Memphis Co. for Pharmaceuticals and Chemical Industries
  - Kahira for Pharmaceuticals & Chemical Industries Co.

=== Affiliated to the Ministry of Health ===
- Holding Company for Biological Products and Vaccines - VACSERA

== Manufacturing & retail ==
=== Ministry of Public Business Sector ===
- Holding Company for Cotton, Spinning, Weaving and Garments
  - Misr Spinning and Weaving Company
  - Damietta Spinning and Weaving Company
  - Daqahliya Spinning and Weaving Company
  - Misr Helwan Spinning and Weaving Company
  - Misr for Artificial Silk
  - Upper Egypt Spinning and Weaving Company
- Metallurgical Industries Holding
  - El Nasr Automotive Manufacturing Company
  - Egyptalum
- Omar Effendi

=== The Presidency of the Republic ===
- Arab Organization for Industrialization (AOI)
  - Arab British Helicopter Company
  - Arab American Vehicles (AAV)
  - AOI Aircraft Factory
  - AOI Engine Factory
  - AOI Electronics Factory
  - Sakr Factory for Development Industries (AOI)
  - Kader Factory for Developed Industries (AOI)
  - Arab British Engine Co. (ABECO) (AOI)
  - Arab British Dynamics Co. ABD (AOI)
  - Egyptian Railways Equipment (SEMAF (ARE))

=== Ministry of Defense ===
- National Service Products Organization (NSPO)
  - National Co. for Natural Water in Siwa (SAFI)
  - National Co. for Food Industry in Rafah
  - The National Company for roads building and development
  - El-Areesh company for cement
  - Queen Company for Macaroni
  - National Company for Refrigerating & Transportation
  - National Company for Batteries
- National Authority for Military Production
  - Abu Zaabal Engineering Industries.
  - Abu Zaabal Specialized Chemicals.
  - Abu Zaabal Specialized Industries.
  - Armoured production and repair factory.
  - Al-Maasara Engineering Industries.
  - Qaha Chemical Industries.
  - Heliopolis Chemical Industries.
  - Banha Electronic Industries.
  - Helwan Castings.
  - Helwan Engineering Industries.
  - Helwan Metal Hardware.
  - Helwan Machinery and Equipment.
  - Helwan Diesel Engines.
  - Shubra Engineering Industries.
  - Abu Qir Engineering Industries.
  - Helwan Non-Ferrous Industries.
  - Military production for engineering projects, consultations and general supplies.

== Utilities ==
- Egyptian Electricity Holding Company (EEHC)
- Holding Company for Water and Wastewater (HCWW) (Owns 25 local and regional subsidiaries)

== Tourism ==
- Holding Company for Tourism and Hotels (HOTAC)
  - Egyptian General Company for Tourism & Hotels (EGOTH)
  - ElMamoura Company for Construction & Tourist Development
  - Misr Travel Company
  - Misr Hotels Company (50%)

== See also ==
- Economy of Egypt
- State ownership
- State-owned enterprise
