= Qanater Prison Complex =

Prison complex in Egypt

- Interactive map of Qanater Prison Complex
- Location: El_Qanater_El_Khayreya, Qalyubia Governorate, Egypt; 30°11′37″N 31°07′55″E
- Status: Operational / Partially Evacuated (Women's Section)
- Security class: Administrative / Criminal / Political
- Opened: c. 1957 (Women's Prison)
- Managed by: Ministry of Interior

Qanater Prison (Sijn al-Qanāṭir) is a major prison complex located in the Qalyubia Governorate of Egypt, approximately 22 kilometres (14 mi) north of Cairo. Historically, it has served as the primary facility for female detainees in Egypt, housing both criminal and political prisoners. The complex also includes a men's prison, which functions largely as a detention center for foreign nationals and asylum seekers facing deportation.

The prison is culturally significant in the Arab world as the setting for seminal works of Adab al-Sujūn (Prison Literature), particularly memoirs written by prominent feminists and intellectuals detained during the presidencies of Gamal Abdel Nasser and]. Since 2023, reports indicate that the Egyptian authorities have begun transferring female inmates from Qanater to the newly constructed 10th of Ramadan Rehabilitation Center.

== History ==
While official records regarding the exact founding date are scarce, unofficial sources and prisoner testimonies date the establishment of the Qanater Women's Prison to approximately 1957. It was developed during the consolidation of the Nasserist state apparatus to hold the growing number of political dissidents, including communists and Islamists.

During the 1981 September Arrests ordered by President], the prison became a focal point for the detention of Egypt's female intelligentsia. Prominent figures such as], Latifa al-Zayyat, and Nawal El Saadawi were held in the "Cell of the Ladies," a period vividly documented in their subsequent literary works.

== Structure and Facilities ==
The complex is divided into two primary distinct facilities: the Women's Prison and the Men's Prison.

=== Qanater Women's Prison ===
Historically the largest women's prison in Egypt, it is divided into wards for "criminal" prisoners (convicted of theft, homicide, etc.) and political prisoners, though overcrowding often leads to mixing.

- The Nursery: Qanater is one of the few Egyptian prisons equipped with a nursery for children born to inmates. The National Council for Human Rights (NCHR) has touted this facility as a model of care, though independent reports describe a grim environment where children are raised behind bars until the age of two or four.
- "The Swamp" (Al-Mostanqa'): A term used by former inmates to describe the disciplinary or isolation cells, characterized by poor ventilation, dampness, and vermin.
- Relocation: As of late 2023 and 2024, significant numbers of female prisoners, including high-profile political detainees like lawyer Hoda Abdel Moneim, have been transferred to the 10th of Ramadan Rehabilitation Center as part of the state's strategy to replace older prisons.

=== Qanater Men's Prison ===
Unlike the women's facility, the men's prison functions primarily as a holding center for foreign nationals, refugees, and asylum seekers facing deportation.

- Foreigner Detention: Human rights organizations have documented the indefinite detention of refugees from Eritrea, Sudan, and Ethiopia in this facility. These detainees often exist in a legal limbo, held administratively without charge while awaiting deportation to countries where they may face persecution.
- Conditions: Inmates in the men's section have reported being denied access to] representation and subjected to pressure to sign "voluntary" return documents.

== Human Rights and Conditions ==
Reports by the Egyptian Initiative for Personal Rights (EIPR) and Amnesty International have highlighted systemic issues within the complex:

- Medical Negligence: A 2014 EIPR study titled "Health in Prisons" detailed the lack of emergency care and bureaucratic hurdles preventing the transfer of critically ill prisoners to external hospitals. The report cited cases of death due to delayed treatment in the Qanater area.
- Hygiene Economy: Hygiene supplies are not provided by the administration. A "hygiene economy" exists where wealthier prisoners purchase detergents brought by families, while poorer prisoners perform cleaning labor for others to survive.
- COVID-19: During the 2020 pandemic, reports emerged of suspected cases being left in communal cells without testing or isolation, exacerbating the spread of the virus.

== Cultural Significance (Prison Literature) ==
Qanater Prison is the birthplace of a distinct sub-genre of Arabic literature known as Adab al-Sujūn (Prison Literature). The specific conditions of the women's prison—focusing on the body, social strata, and gendered oppression—have produced some of the most widely read texts in modern Egyptian history.

- Nawal AlSaadawy: Imprisoned in 1981, she wrote Memoirs from the Women's Prison (1983) on rolls of toilet paper using a smuggled eyebrow pencil. She famously described the prison as a microcosm of patriarchal society: "Every citizen is a potential prisoner in a police state." Her earlier novel, Woman at Point Zero (1975), was also based on interviews with a death-row inmate named Firdaus at Qanater.
- Latifa al-Zayyat: The Marxist critic and writer documented her 1981 detention in The Search: Personal Papers (Hamlat Taftish). Her narrative focuses on the humiliation of the strip search and the solidarity forged between political and "criminal" prisoners.
- Inji Efflatoun: The visual artist, imprisoned from 1959 to 1963, produced a series of paintings capturing the view of the Nile through her cell bars and portraits of fellow inmates, blending aesthetic beauty with the reality of confinement.

== Notable Inmates ==
- Inji Efflatoun (Artist, 1959–1963)
- Nawal El Saadawi (Feminist writer, 1981)
- Latifa al-Zayyat (Writer, 1981)
- Safinaz Kazem (Islamist writer, 1981)
- Mahienour El-Massry (Human rights lawyer, post-2013)
- Haneen Hossam and Mawada Eladhm (Social media influencers, aka "The TikTok girls, 2020)
- Hoda Abdel Moneim (Human rights lawyer, transferred 2023)

== See also ==
- Tora Prison
- Human rights in Egypt
- Literature of Egypt
