= SENA 200 =

- Type: Amphibious infantry fighting vehicle
- Place of origin: Egypt

Service history
- In service: January 2024–
- Used by: Egyptian Armed Forces

Production history
- Designer: Military Factory 200
- Manufacturer: Ministry of Military Production with the Egyptian Army Research and Development Centre

Specifications
- Mass: 13.8 tons
- Length: 6.1 m
- Width: 3.04 m.
- Height: 1.88 m without the main armament.
- Crew: The troop compartment accommodates up to six soldiers in two rows of three centrally-mounted seats, allowing personnel to face outward for the utilization of individual weapons, in line with the Egyptian Army doctrine.
- Main armament: Can be armed with an automatic cannon up to 30 mm caliber. It is armed with a 12.7 mm machine gun and remote controlled weapon station Eagle 1.
- Engine: HD12ZLG-M 6-cylinder in line turbocharged diesel engine with a 385 hp output.
- Suspension: Tracked torsion bars and shock absorbers suspensions consisting on each side of five road wheels with the drive sprocket at the front and the idler at the rear. The upper part is protected by armor plates.
- Ground clearance: 360 mm
- Operational range: 600 km
- Maximum speed: 65 km/h on road. 45 km/h off-road.

The SENA 200 or Sinai 200 is the first domestic Egyptian amphibious infantry fighting vehicle (IFV). The beginning of the design and production of this armored vehicle within the “Military Factory 200” armored production and repair factory. Designed and produced by the Ministry of Military Production as a tracked armored vehicle overcoming the Russian BMP.

The national organization for military production, subordinate to the Egyptian Ministry of Defense, has developed a new tracked armored infantry fighting vehicle SENA 200. The vehicle was first presented to the public at the site of the local defense exhibition EDEX 2021.

== Design ==
The design of the SENA 200 seems very similar to the Soviet BMP series, but according to the Egyptian Defense Industry, it is an entirely new vehicle. The vehicle is based on tracked torsion bars and shock absorbers suspensions consisting on each side of five road wheels with the drive sprocket at the front and the idler at the rear. The upper part is protected by armor plates, and the tracks are made of solid steel and rubber pads.

== Protection level ==
According to the brochure published by the producer of the SENA 200, the hull of the vehicle provides ballistic protection up to Level 4 STANAG 45698 against the firing of small arms 14.5×114mm AP (Armor Piercing). The vehicle floor offers mine protection up to Level 3 STANAG 4569 against mine blast explosion of 8 kg TNT under the body and the tracks. The front and the side of the SENA 200 can be also fitted with an anti-RPG nets (Rocket Propelled Grenade), which can be installed on each side of the vehicle. The nets, made of aramid fibers reinforced with steel masses, are said to achieve an 85% probability of protection and to defeat RPGs by disrupting their fusing mechanism as the incoming rocket is trapped by the net.

The under-track or under-belly specifics were not specified, but the blast effects on personnel are mitigated through energy-absorbing seats.

== Maneuver ==
The SENA 200 is powered by a HD12ZLG-M 6-cylinder in line turbocharged diesel engine with a 385 hp output. (the original engine being a stroke diesel engine of 360 hp replaced by the "RAAD 200" 385 hp engine). The vehicle can run at a maximum road speed of 65 km/h and 45 km/h off-road with a maximum cruising range of 600 km and a ground clearance of 360 mm. The vehicle has a low silhouette with a length of 6.1 m, a wide of 3.04 m, and a height of 1.88m without the main armament. It has a combat weight of only 14 tons. The SENA 200 also have amphibious capabilities and is propelled in the water by its tracks.

== Variants ==
The exhibited vehicle at the EDEX 2023 exhibition featured the Eagle 1 RCWS from the Egyptian AIO company, while another variant was presented as a combat support vehicle with a one-man turret armed with a 30 mm cannon.

Beside the troop carrier and fire support variants, the SENA 200 is proposed also as ambulance, missile launcher, mortar carrier, signal vehicle, command and control vehicle, ammunition carrier, logistic transporter and finally electronic warfare vehicle.

== Armament ==
The SENA 200 can be fitted with a wide range of weapon systems and can be armed with an automatic cannon up to 30 mm caliber. It is armed with a 12.7 mm machine gun. Withstands fragments of 155 mm artillery shells at a distance of 30 meters. At EDEX 2021, the SENA 200 was equipped with Remote Controlled Weapon Station (RCWS) Eagle 1 jointly manufactured by the Egyptian company AIO and the Spanish company Escribano Mechanical & Engineering which can mount various weapons including 5.56 mm, 7.62 mm, 12.7 mm, and 14.5 mm calibers. It has a weight of 185 kg excluding the weapon and ammunition.

== Operators ==
- Egypt: According to information available the production contract was signed, Factory 200 being currently in the production planning phase. No potential production numbers were provided, assembly being ongoing, delivery of the first batch being planned for January 2024.
