= Mohamed Salah Mostafa =

Egyptian politician & engineer (born 1960)

- محمد صلاح مصطفى
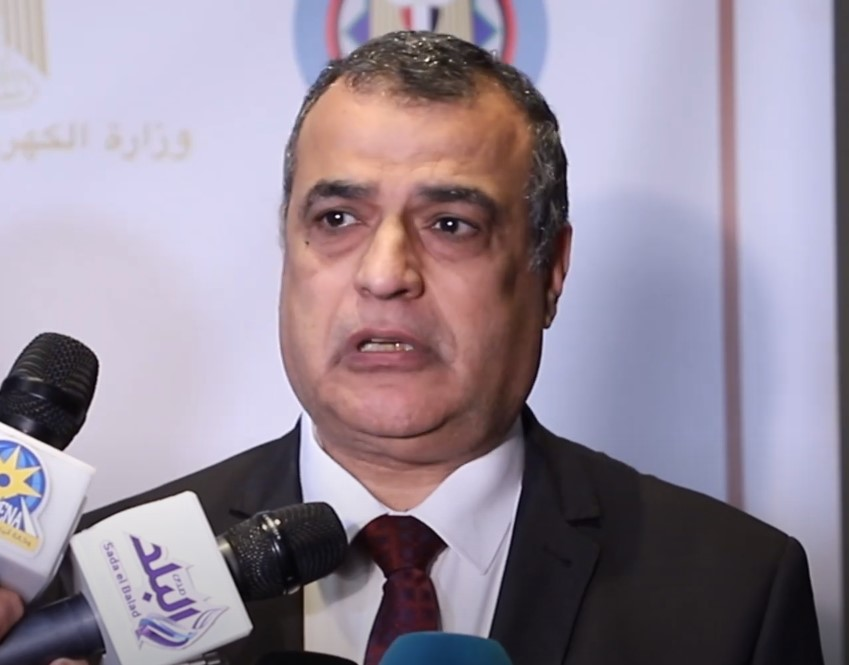

Minister of Military Production
- Incumbent
- Assumed office 14 August 2022
- Prime Minister: Mostafa Madbouly

Personal details
- Born: Mohamed Mohamed Salah el-Din Mostafa; 6 September 1960 (age 66)
- Party: Independent
- Education: Military Technical College
- Awards: Long Service and Good Example Medal, first class Excellent service medal January 25 medal Military Duty Medal, First Class

Military service
- Branch/service: Egyptian Army
- Rank: Major General
- Unit: Infantry

Mohamed Mohamed Salah el-Din Mostafa (born 6 September 1960) (Egyptian Arabic: محمد محمد صلاح الدين مصطفى) is an Egyptian engineer and military general, holding the position of Minister of Military Production since 14 August 2022 in the Ministry of Mostafa Madbouly, and he held the position of Vice President of the National Authority for Military Production Since 24 November 2020.

== Career ==
Mohamed Salah El-Din served in various positions during his military career including serving as an assistant to the commander of Armament Authority of the Armed Forces of Egypt and later transferred to Arab Organisation for Industrialisation from 2019 to 2020. He was an advisor to the minister of Military Production and vice president of the National Authority for military Production. He was appointed vice president of the National Authority for military Production on the recommendation of the minister of military production following the passing of vice president of the organization Hassan Abdul Majeed on 15 November 2020. El-Din served in this position from 24 November 2020 until his appointment as minister of Military Production succeeding Mohamed Ahmed Morsi.

In February 2023, a leaked secret document from Pentagon, United States suspected El-Din as a key figure in the government of Egypt's plan to covertly produce and supply over 40,000 rockets, artillery rounds and gunpowder to Russia. The document stated that President el-Sissi was heard in the conversation instructing the military officer named Salah al-Dinto (suspected to be Mohamed Salah El-Din) to keep the plan secret “to avoid problems with the West”.

=== Qualifications and academic degrees ===
- Bachelor of Engineering July 1983 (Military Technical College)
- MMC course in the United States of America for (3 weeks)
- Quality course at the American University in Cairo
- Attending conferences/scientific missions/visits to factories abroad to (Italy – America – England – Germany – France – Russia – China – Brazil – Austria – Croatia – UAE – Sudan)
- He was appointed as a member of the boards of directors of some companies of the National Authority for Military Production and the Arab Organization for Industrialization

=== Positions held ===
- Commander of the Parachute Brigade Workshop 1986
- Vehicle station workshop commander 1998
- Vehicle sub-workshop commander 2000
- Chief Engineer of the Engineering Industries Complex 2003
- Jeep workshop commander 2005
- Assistant Director of Armament Vehicles 2009
- Deputy Chairman of the Armed Forces Armament Authority 2016
- Head of the technical sectors of the Arab Organization for Industrialization
- Advisor to the Director General of the Arab Organization for Industrialization
- Advisor to the Minister of State for Military Production
- Vice chairman of the board of directors of the National Military Production Authority
