= Abu Zaabal =

- Village
- Location within Egypt
- Coordinates: 30°14′58″N 31°21′16″E
- Country: Egypt
- Governorate: Qalyubiyya

Population (2006)
  - Total: 55,938
- Time zone: UTC+2 (EET)
  - Summer (DST): UTC+3 (EEST)

Abu Zaabal or Abu Za'bal (Arabic: أبو زعبل, ALA-LC: Abū Zaʻbal ) (Egyptian Arabic pronunciation: [æbuˈzæʕbæl]) is a huge industrial center in Egypt and one of the villages of Al Khankah in the Qalyubia Governorate, Egypt.

== History ==
The older name of the town is al-Quseir (Arabic: القصير, lit. 'small castle').

During the reign of Mahammad Ali Pasha, the village included the military preparatory school to prepare students to enter military schools, which had a capacity of about 500 students, after it was transferred to it from the El-Qasr el-Eini area in Cairo, where it now had a capacity for about 1,200 students, and the Infantry School was also moved to it in the year 1841 from Damietta. In 1827, the village was also the cradle of the first medical school established in Egypt.

In modern Egypt, the area is an industrial suburb of Cairo, with an extensive military–industrial complex and well-developed chemical industries. It is home to the Armoured production and repair factory, Abu Zaabal Engineering Industries, Abu Zaabal Specialized Industries and Abu Zaabal Specialized Chemicals.

== 1970 bombing incident ==
- On February 13, 1970, an Israeli Air Force bomber dropped bombs and napalm on an industrial plant in Abu Za'abal, killing 80 civilian workers.

== 2013 prisoners killed in prison custody incident ==
In August 2013, 37 prisoners at Abu Za'abal prison were killed after guards fired tear gas into an overfilled transport truck containing prisoners during intense heat.
