= Al Khankah =

Al Khankah الخانكة
- Town
- Location within Egypt
- Coordinates: 30°13′N 31°22′E
- Country: Egypt
- Governorate: Qalyubiyya

Area
  - Total: 10.4 km^{2} (4.0 sq mi)
- Elevation: 19 m (62 ft)

Population (2023)
  - Total: 83,981
  - Density: 8,080/km^{2} (20,900/sq mi)
- Time zone: UTC+2 (EET)
  - Summer (DST): UTC+3 (EEST)

Al Khankah (Arabic: الخانكة) is an Egyptian administrative center. It is located in Qalyubia Governorate, within the Greater Cairo Region in the Arab Republic of Egypt. The administrative base of the center is the city of Khanka, and it also includes the city of Khusus.

== History ==
Al-Khankah is one of the oldest Egyptian cities with a long history. The name of Khankah is attributed to the Khanqah established by Al-Nasir Muhammad bin Qalawun in the place of the current city. In the year 725 AH, it was called the Syriac Khanqah, and this word means "place of worship" in the Persian language. It is one of the types of buildings in Islamic architecture that extends the length of stay for people like the Sufis, as it is used to establish religious rituals and housing, as well as teaching religious sciences and doctrines, distorting the name over time to facilitate pronunciation until its name becomes Khanka. The most important landmarks are the new street, Al-Mahatta and Al-Qasimia on Thursday, Abu Murtad Mosque, Al-Ashraf Al-Mahkama Mosque and Mental Hospital.

== Division ==
Village Local Units:

- Abu Zaabal
- Manila, Al-Khanka
- Syriacos, Khanka
- Al-Khosus, Khanka
- Al-Qalq
- Yellow Mountain
- kafr hamza.
