= El Hasafah =

Village in Qalyubia Governorate, Egypt

al Ḩaşāfah الحصافة
- Location within Nile Delta Location within Egypt
- Coordinates: 30°19′38″N 31°15′07″E
- Country: Egypt
- Governorate: Qalyubiyya Governorate
- Time zone: UTC+2 (EET)
  - Summer (DST): UTC+3 (EEST)

El Hasafah (Egyptian Arabic: الحصافة) is a village in Shibin El Qanater in the Qalyubiyya Governorate.

== Population (2006) ==
Its population was 5,206 at the 2006 Census.

== Economy ==
The economy of the city depends on agriculture, commerce and to a lesser extent on industry.
