= Amstone =

Arms manufacturer based in Egypt

- Company type: Private company
- Industry: Defence
- Founded: 2018
- Headquarters: Egypt
- Website: amstoneig.com

Amstone (Egyptian Arabic: أمستون) is an Egyptian company specializing in the development and production of advanced defense and security solutions. Established in 2018, the company has positioned itself as a key player in Egypt's defense industry through strategic partnerships with global defense firms. Amstone focuses on bolstering domestic arms production by integrating international expertise with local manufacturing capabilities. The company manufactures unmanned systems, anti-drone systems, smart munitions, and military technologies in collaboration with international defense firms.

== Products ==
- AirCamel: A multi-purpose, heavy-payload unmanned aerial vehicle with a total weight of 500 kg and a payload capacity of up to 250 kg. It is designed for both logistical operations, including firefighting and reconnaissance, as well combat applications, capable of carrying projectiles when required.
- EMP: A hybrid system combining an EMP gun with an effective range of up to 50 meters and a GNSS spoofer utilizing the Hellosat-S3000, capable of disrupting signals within a 6 km radius.
- Hydra B5: An unmanned surface vessel designed for patrol and coastal security missions. It was developed in partnership with Cypriot company Swarmly and Italian company Leonardo. The vessel features a 600 kg payload capacity, weighs 1,500 kg, and measures 8.9 meters in length. It can reach speeds of up to 85 knots and is equipped with a remote-controlled 12.7mm machine gun and a small drone for close-range reconnaissance. It can also be armed with Black Scorpion lightweight torpedoes and is available in both armed and suicide versions.
- H12 Poseidon: A long-range unmanned aerial vehicle with an operational range of over 150 km., also developed together with Swarmly. It is designed to operate in challenging environments, capable of overcoming GNSS satellite navigation jamming and harsh weather conditions. The UAV is equipped with electro-optical thermal surveillance systems to perform diverse reconnaissance tasks.

== See also ==
- Military industry of Egypt
- Robotics Engineering Systems
