= Abu Zaabal Specialized Industries =

Abu Zaabal Specialized Industries Military Factory 300
- Company type: Government Joint-stock company
- Industry: Defence
- Founded: 2016; 10 years ago
- Headquarters: Abu Zaabal, Qalyubia Governorate, Egypt
- Area served: Egypt
- Key people: Tarek Ezzat (chairman of the factory)
- Owner: Ministry of Military Production
- Parent: National Authority for Military Production.
- Website: https://fact300.momp.gov.eg/

The Abu Zaabal Specialized Industries Company (Egyptian Arabic: أبو زعبل للصناعات المتخصصة) or Military Factory 300 (مصنع 300 الحربي) is an Egyptian government joint-stock company, one of the companies of the National Authority for Military Production affiliated with the Ministry of Military Production, established by Resolution of the Minister of Military Production No. 37 of 2016, located in the Abu Zaabal area in Qalyubia Governorate, on an area of 371 acres, works in the field of producing small and medium weapons and ammunition of various types.

== Products ==
Small arms

- Multi-purpose machine gun caliber 7.62 x 51 mm.
- Maadi grenade launcher caliber 40 x 53 mm.
- Helwan 920 pistol.
- 40 mm grenade launcher.
- Misr automatic rifle caliber 7.62 x 39 mm.

Ammunition and protactical materials

- Manufacturing small arms ammunition.
- Manufacturing medium arms ammunition.
- Manufacturing bombs, ball ammunition, detonators and reagents.

== See also ==
- Abu Zaabal Engineering Industries.
- Armoured production and repair factory.
