= Shibin El Qanater =

- City
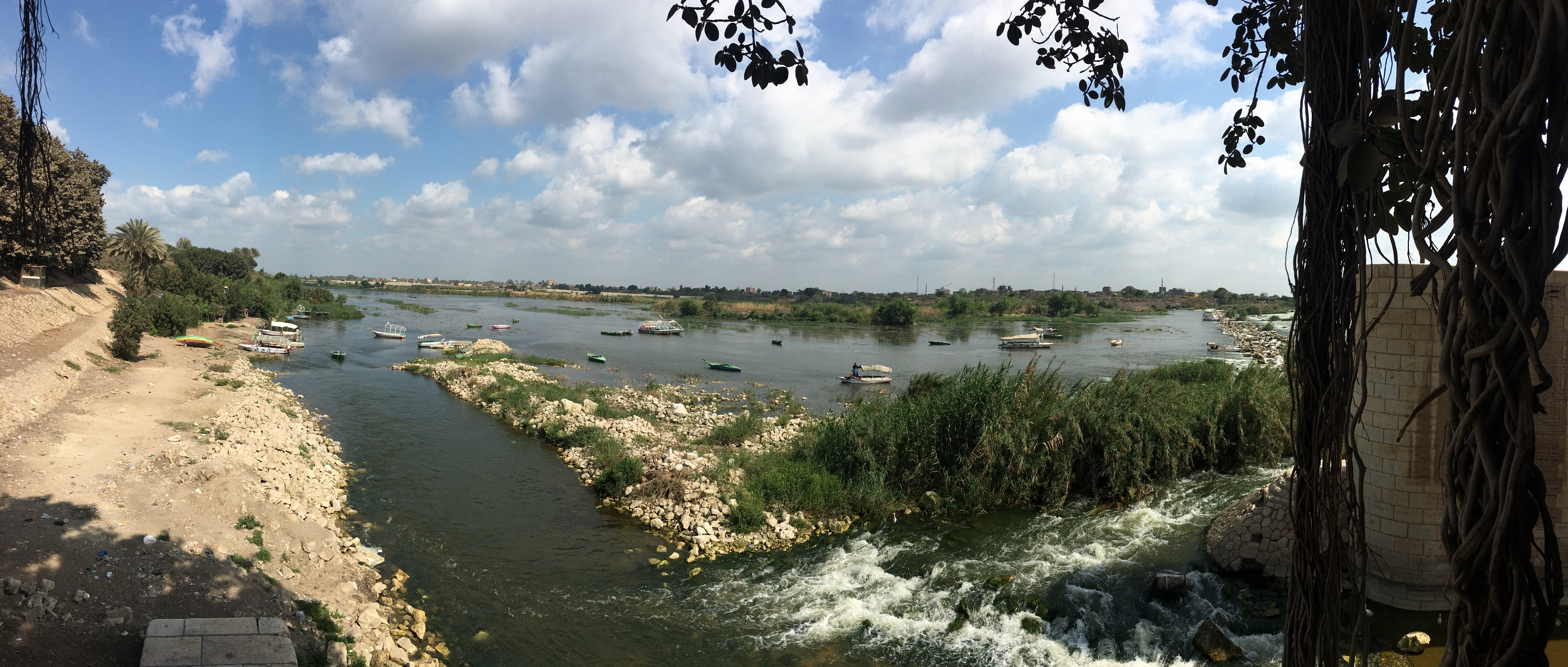

- Location within Egypt
- Country: Egypt

Area
  - Total: 138.6 km^{2} (53.5 sq mi)

Population (2021)
  - Total: 570,868
  - Density: 4,119/km^{2} (10,670/sq mi)
- Time zone: UTC+2 (EET)
  - Summer (DST): UTC+3 (EEST)

Shibin Al-Qanater

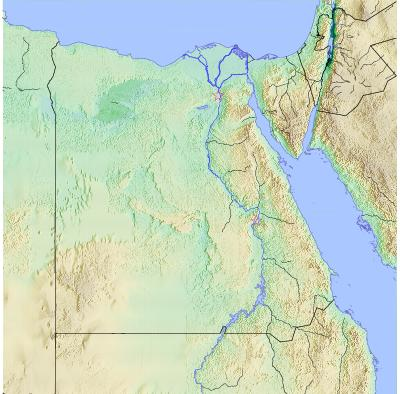

Shibin El Qanater (Arabic: شبين القناطر), previously known as Shaybin al-Qasr (Arabic: سيبين القصر) and Scenae Veteranorum is a region (markaz) in Egypt situated in the center of the Qalyubia Governorate. Its population was 423,783 at the 2006 Census and comprises 36 villages.

== History ==
The modern town used to be a Roman army encampment serving as a station of cavalry units "Equites Saraceni Thamudeni" and "Ala quinta Raetorum".

The town of Shibin El Qanater is one of the ancient villages, where it appeared in the name of “Shibin Al-Qasr” in the book “The Laws of Diwans of Al-Asaad Bin Mattati” from the works of Al-Sharqiya, which is the name given to it in the Salahi rock conducted by the Ayyubid Sultan Al-Nasir Salah Al-Din in the year 572 AH / 1176 AD, as it was mentioned in the name “Shibin Al-Qasr One of Qalubia’s works in the book “A Sunni Masterpiece in the Names of the Egyptian Countries” by Ibn Al-Jiaan who surrounded the Egyptian villages after the Nasserite rock that was conducted by the Mamluk Sultan Al-Nasir Muhammad bin Qalawun in 715 AH / 1315AD. In the Ottoman era, it was mentioned in the Ottoman sources, which was conducted by the Ottoman governor Suleiman Pasha Al-Khadim during the era of the Ottoman Sultan Suleiman the Magnificent within the villages of the province of Qaliubiya.

Ramzi connects the first part of the name to Arabic: أشيب ʾašyab "grey-coloured, old" akin to the Latin: veteranorum "old".

Among the most important monuments found in the region are huge ruins that were used in building a weird style on the Egyptian architecture. It indicates that the dead are not Egyptians, this region is known as the Jewish hill, and there are other remains that have not yet been discovered, and on their way to discovery.

== List of villages ==
- Shibin El-Qanater
- Kafr Shibin
- El Ahraz
- El Hasafah
- El Kulzom
- El Zahweyeen
- Ezbet El Gewily
- Ezbet El Wakeel
- Kafr El Dair
- Kafr El Shaikha Salma
- Kafr El Shawbak
- Kafr El Sohby
- Kafr Taha
- Mansh'at El Keram
- Menyet Shibin
- Nawa (Shibin El Qanater)
- Taha Nub
- Tal Bani Tamim
- Elmoreeg
- El Shawbak
- Tohouria
