= Robotics Engineering Systems =

Robotics Engineering Systems (RES)
- Company type: Private company
- Industry: Defence
- Headquarters: Egypt

Robotics Engineering Systems (Egyptian Arabic: روبوتيكس إنجينيرينج سيستمز) is an Egyptian defense technology company specializing in the development and production of unmanned aerial vehicles (UAVs) and precision-guided munitions. The company plays a key role in advancing Egypt's military capabilities through the local design and manufacturing of reconnaissance and combat drones, smart bombs, and guided artillery shells.

== Products ==
=== Unmanned aerial vehicles ===
- June 30 – A reconnaissance UAV in service with the Egyptian Air Force for 4–5 years, with 2,500 flight hours. It features an interchangeable FLIR EO/IR/LRF turret or synthetic aperture radar for surveillance.
- Ahmose – Developed in 2019, this UAV is built for reconnaissance and intelligence missions, featuring a 1,200 kg takeoff weight, 18-meter wingspan, 145 hp gasoline engine, and a 250 km/h maximum speed.
- 6 October – A medium-altitude, long-endurance (MALE) UAV still in development, featuring 16 hardpoints for weapons, an extended range of 240 km, and a projected first flight in 2025.
- Taba/Taba 2 – UAVs produced in large quantities for reconnaissance and surveillance missions.

=== Smart munitions ===
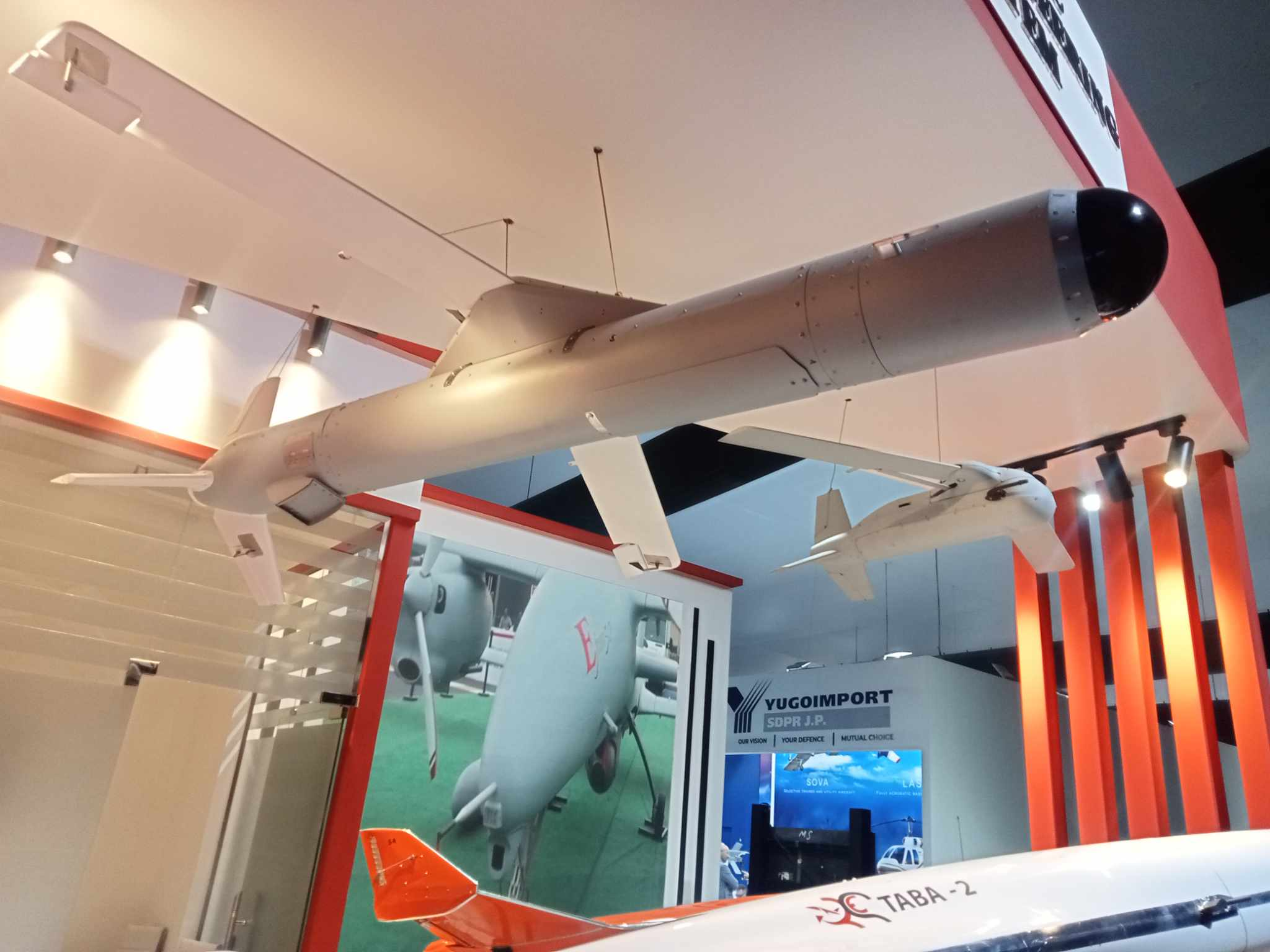
LR 155 GPK, on display during the Egypt International Airshow 2024 hosted in New Alamein

- GWD-6 – A glide bomb capable of carrying a 1,000 kg warhead, guided by GPS, inertial navigation system, and electro-optical sensors, with a 50 km operational range.
- 122mm and 155mm artillery shells – Small-sized smart munitions equipped with a precision guidance kit, extending their range to 30 km while utilizing inertial navigation system, GPS, and electro-optical guidance for enhanced precision.
- 155 LR GPK – A guided air-to-surface missile carrying a 155mm warhead, featuring aerodynamic control systems, GPS, INS, and electro-optical guidance. It is integrated with a long-range smart munition guidance kit, enabling a strike range of up to 80 km.
- 122 GPK – A guided air-to-surface missile carrying a 122mm warhead, featuring aerodynamic control surfaces, GPS, INS, and electro-optical guidance. It is integrated with a long-range smart munition guidance kit, enabling a strike range of up to 80 km.

== See also ==
- Military industry of Egypt
- Amstone
