= Heliopolis Chemical Industries =

Egyptian governmental joint-stock company

Heliopolis Chemical Industries Company Military Factory 81
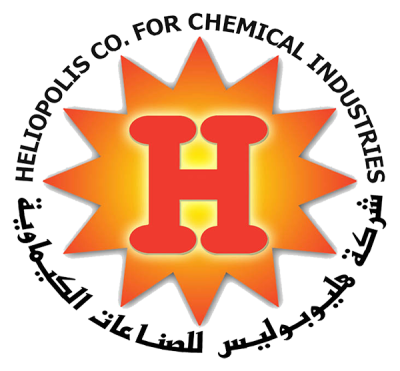
- Type: Government-owned company
- Industry: Defence and consumer products
- Founded: 1949; 77 years ago
- Headquarters: Heliopolis, Cairo, Egypt
- Area served: Egypt
- Key people: Medhat Shokry (Chairman)
- Owner: Ministry of Military Production
- Parent: National Authority for Military Production
- Website: http://fact81.momp.gov.eg/

Heliopolis Chemical Industries Company (Egyptian Arabic: شركة هليوبوليس للصناعات الكيماوية), or Military Factory 81 (مصنع 81 الحربي), is an Egyptian governmental joint-stock company, one of the companies of the National Authority for Military Production, affiliated with the Ministry of Military Production. It was established in 1949 as the first Egyptian company specialized in the production of paints and chemicals. Production departments and equipment have developed using the latest equipment, laboratories, quality control devices and continuous training for workers at all levels.

The development of production units included the establishment of units with the latest model and the most accurate experience for rubber and plastic products with the specifications and properties necessary for the most precise conditions of use, in addition to other distinguished departments in the production of paints, chemicals, and metal powders. The development also included a factory for the production of aluminum powder and shiny and matte aluminum pastes with the latest international technology. The factory is considered the only one in Egypt and the Middle East. A factory for formaldehyde, resins and urea-formaldehyde was also established according to the latest international systems.

== History ==
Military Factory 81 began its production activity in 1949 as the first factory to produce 81 mm mortar bombs on a total area of 833 acres in the Haikstep area. Various military and civil industries were introduced in the following years.

In the 1950s, the production of mortar bombs, hand grenades, hexamine, safety fuse and explosive fuse began.

The name of the factory was changed to Heliopolis Company for Military and Civil Chemicals (formerly Military Factory 81) as a joint-stock company in November 1963 in accordance with the decision of the Board of Directors of the Egyptian General Corporation for Military Factories No. 233 of 1963, and registration was made in the commercial registry under No. 20174 Cairo in June 1964.

The company was re-formed under the name Heliopolis Chemical Industries Company (formerly Military Factory 81) in accordance with Cabinet Resolution No. 5 of 1976 in January 1976.

== Products ==
=== Military products ===
- Executed Protective Suit Model (M81-A)
- Protective mask (M-3E) for tank crew (M60-A3)
- Protective Mask (M-2)
- Protective equipment No. (1): gown - gloves - shoes
- Naval explosive device
- Launching materials
- Explosive fuse
- Safety fuse
- 107 mm missile
- M80 anti-tank mine
- Anti-tank mine (T.C.6)
- 130 mm ammunition
- 155 mm ammunition

=== Civilian products ===
- Safety fuse
- Explosive fuse
- Heliobox 300 PC
- Sealerin varnish
- Heliothane varnish
- Street landscaping paint (Rod Stahl)
- Helio plastic
- Helio Matt
- Primer M P
- Hot road marking paint
- Centolin glossy lacquer
- Centolin primer
- Dry fuel
- Sodium nitrate
- Hexamine
- Formaldehyde
- Urea-formaldehyde
- Heliobest 1065L aluminum foil
- Aluminum powder
- Heliomar anti-fouling paint 100AF
- HBS Heliocyst anti-rust paint
- VC Heliobox marine paints
- Nitrolene paint
- M2 industrial protective mask
- Unity chair

== International quality certificates ==
- ISO 9001:2000 certification in the field of the production of aluminum powder and paste, hexamine formaldehyde, resins, rubber and plastic and fuse products
- ISO 9001:2008 certification in the field of the production of aluminum powder and paste, hexamine formaldehyde, resins, rubber and plastic and fuse products
- ISO 14001:2004 certification in the field of the production of aluminum powder and paste, hexamine formaldehyde, resins, rubber and plastic and fuse products

== See also ==
- Qaha Chemical Industries
- Abu Zaabal Specialized Chemicals
