= RAAD 200 =

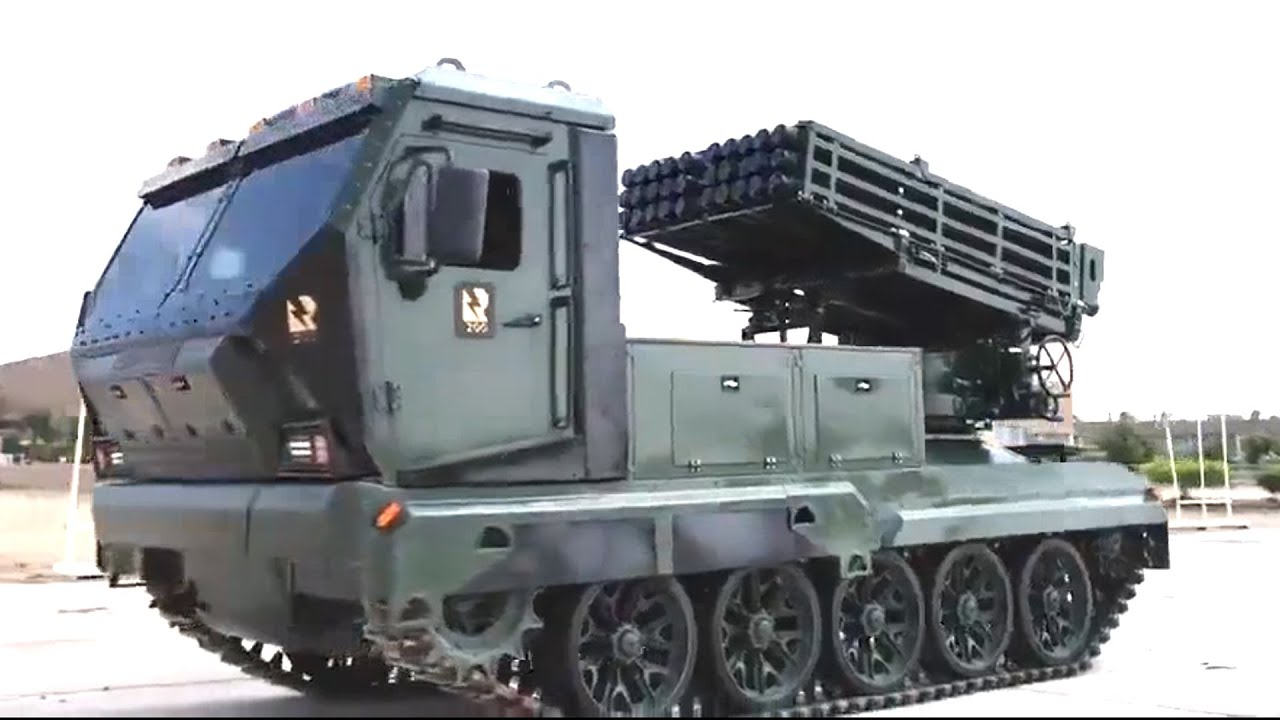
- Type: Multiple rocket launcher
- Place of origin: Egypt

Service history
- Used by: See operators below.

Production history
- Designer: Ministry of Military Production
- Manufacturer: Military Factory 200

Specifications
- Mass: combat mass of 18.58 tonnes, 1.98 tonnes being represented by the payload which is made of 30 Sakr 122 mm rockets hosted in three rows of 10 tubes each. It also has a curb weight of 16.60 tonnes.
- Length: 6.5 m
- Width: 2.85 m
- Height: 3.1 m
- Crew: 3
- Caliber: 122 mm
- Maximum firing range: 45 km
- Engine: Four-stroke liquid-cooled HD12ZLG-M 6-cylinder in line turbocharged diesel engine with an output of 385 hp at 2,000 rpm.
- Transmission: Dry multi-plate clutch and a five forward speed mechanical transmission, with one reverse gear.
- Suspension: 10 torsion bars with four shock absorbers, the chassis being fitted with steel tracks with tension adjustment mechanism.
- Ground clearance: 400 mm
- Operational range: 400 km
- Maximum speed: 46 km/h

The RAAD 200 is an Egyptian armoured tracked self-propelled 122 mm multiple rocket launcher, unveiled in the EDEX 2023 exhibition by the Egyptian National Organisation for Military Production.

== Design ==
The RAAD 200 is a tracked vehicle equipped with five road wheels on each side, designed for various types of operations and developed by the National Organisation for Military Production in Egypt.

One of its most notable features is its armament system — a rocket launcher that significantly enhances its offensive capabilities. The vehicle accommodates a driver and two additional seats. This design underscores its role as a combat yet powerful battlefield asset.

The RAAD 200 measures 6.5 meters in length, 2.85 meters in width, and 3.1 meters in height. With a ground clearance of 400 mm, it can navigate challenging terrains. It also has a combat mass of 18,580 kg (18.58 tonnes) and a curb weight of 16,600 kg (16.60 tonnes), allowing it to carry a payload of 1,980 kg (1.98 tonnes).

== Maneuver ==
It can reach a maximum speed of 46 km/h and can handle gradients up to 35° and side slopes of 25°. Additionally, it has a fording depth of 1.1 meters and a minimum turning radius of 1.2 meters, highlighting its maneuverability in various environments. It also has an operational range of 400 km.

The vehicle's power comes from a four-stroke liquid-cooled turbocharged diesel engine, the HD12ZLG-M, made in Germany and assembled in China, is the only part in the system not provided in Egypt, 80% of the RAAD 200 being produced locally. This engine, featuring six inline cylinders, delivers an output of 385 hp at 2,000 rpm. It is equipped with a dry multi-plate clutch and a five-speed mechanical gearbox, with one reverse gear.

The suspension system of the RAAD 200 uses 10 torsion bars with four shock absorbers. The track is made of steel with an adjustment mechanism, tailored for durability and adaptability. The brake system includes drum and strap mechanisms, and the electrical system operates on a 24V setup with two batteries.

== Armament ==
A pivotal feature of the RAAD 200 is its launcher specifications. It employs the BM-21/BS-45 type launcher, capable of reaching up to 45 km. The launcher includes a base plate with a rotary disc and a spiral spindle, offering a wide range of motion - 55° vertically and 60° to 100° horizontally. This system enables a rapid launching rate of 30 rockets in 15 seconds.

The rockets used are of the Grad and Sakr types, 122 mm in diameter and 2,870 mm in length. The launcher control unit includes automatic control with two servo motors. Additional features of the RAAD 200 include rear outriggers for stability, a cabin folding system for adaptability, an air conditioning system for crew comfort, and comprehensive communication equipment.

It is equipped with a remote control system that provides protection for the crew. The launcher can be fired in single or multiple launch modes.

== Operators ==
Egypt
