= M1A1 tank coproduction program in Egypt =

United States and Egypt joint venture

The M1A1 Co-production Program is a joint venture between the governments of the United States and Egypt to produce parts and assemble tank kits for the M1 Abrams main battle tank at the Armored Production and Repair Factory in Egypt.

== Background ==
The program and the plan for the construction of the co-production facility were advanced by Field Marshal Abd al-Halim Abu Ghazala as a way for Egypt to save money on the procurement of M1 Abrams main battle tanks while concurrently developing its own defense industrial base. Initially, the plan would was estimated to eventually shift 40% of the tank's production to Egypt to save money by taking advantage of the low cost of Egyptian labor. These savings would be realized over the course of a decade-long production run of 1,500 tanks, as well as the eventual use of the factory to produce other kinds of vehicles and serve as a repair depot for Egypt's fleet of M60 Patton main battle tanks. In 1984, Egypt signed a US$150 million contract with General Dynamics for the construction of the factory, which was financed using American security assistance funds and portions of Egypt's annual US$1.3 billion in foreign military financing.

== Operation ==
Starting production in 1988, the factory soon experienced numerous cost overruns, inflating the price of each tank to a level beyond the cost of buying complete tanks—the initial production run was estimated to cost US$2.7 billion versus US$1.9 billion for purchasing tanks directly from the United States via General Dynamics. Egyptian defense officials believed these additional costs were of no concern, stating that the factory "...serves other Egyptian goals such as economic development, modernization of the tank fleet, self-sufficiency in tank production..." However, in a review of the program, the General Accounting Office (now the Government Accountability Office) noted that Egypt's purported gains in self-sufficiency were limited because the United States, citing security issues, would not part with key pieces of technology needed to manufacture the bulk of the tank's components, including the armor, fire-control system, and engine. Egyptian input in the production process was originally planned increase over the course of six phases, with later phases including the transfer of technologies needed to manufacture more advanced portions of the vehicle; however, the cost increases and the lack of technology transfers eventually halted the advancement of these phases, leaving the factory in a position where it only had the capability to produce the simplest parts of the tank and had to acquire all other parts from US-based companies. As a consequence, American officials estimated that Egypt would only be able to indigenously produce 19% of the tank's parts.

== Today ==
In 2011, the co-production program has yielded approximately 1,130 Abrams tanks. The shipment of additional tank kits to the factory was suspended, along with the transfer of other military vehicles, in response to the Egyptian military's violent crackdown of Muslim Brotherhood supporters following the removal of Mohamed Morsi from power. In addition to assembling tanks, the co-production facility also produces construction vehicles intended for the commercial market. In 2025 it received permission to upgrade Egypt's tanks from the U.S. Department of State.
