= Qaha =

- City
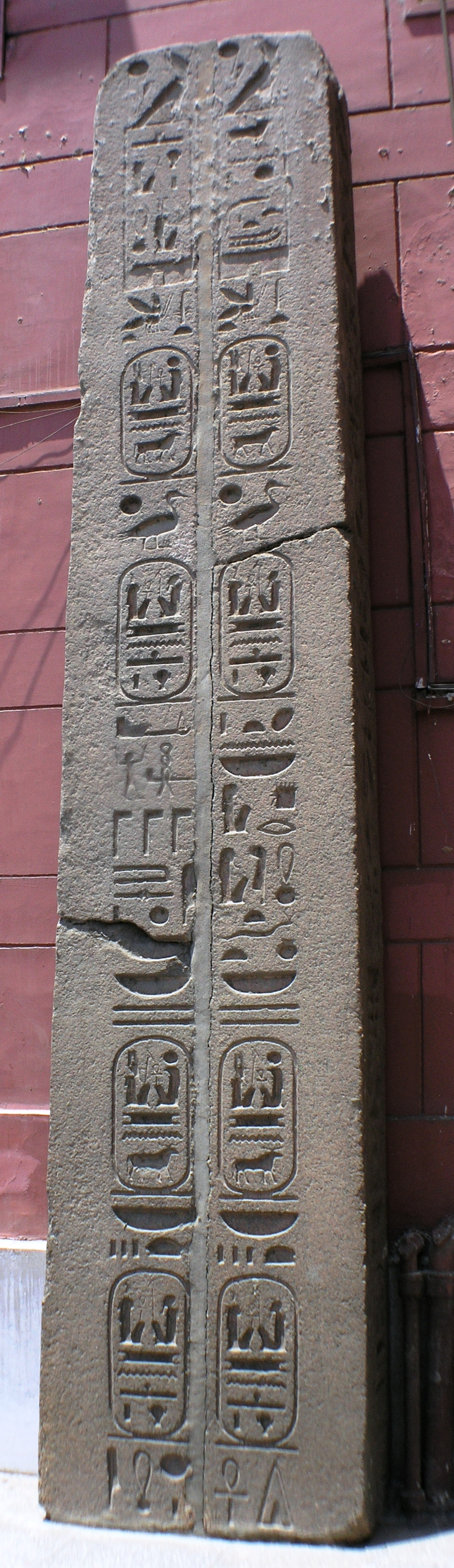
- Part of an obelisk with cartouches of Merenptah, 19th dynasty. This piece was found at Qaha and therefore is called "obelisk from Qaha".

- Location in Egypt
- Coordinates: 30°17′N 31°12′E
- Country: Egypt
- Governorate: Qalyubia

Area
  - Total: 4.67 sq mi (12.10 km^{2})
- Elevation: 52 ft (16 m)

Population (2021)
  - Total: 50,850
  - Density: 10,880/sq mi (4,202/km^{2})
- Time zone: UTC+2 (EET)
  - Summer (DST): UTC+3 (EEST)

Qaha (Egyptian Arabic: قها pronounced [ˈʔæhæ], from Coptic: ⲕⲁϩⲓ, lit. 'earth, ground') is a city in northeastern Egypt, located 25 km (18 mins) north of Cairo. It is located in the rich farmland of the southern part of the Nile Delta, and is well-irrigated by canals leading off the Delta Barrage.

== History ==
Qaha is one of the ancient villages, and its original name at the time of the Islamic conquest of Egypt was Kahani. It was mentioned as Qaha in the book of the laws of diwans of Asaad ibn Matati from the works of Al-Sharqiya, which is the name given to it in the Salahi rock, conducted by the Ayyubid Sultan Al-Nasir Saladdin Sunnah. 572 AH / 1176AD, as it was mentioned in the name of Qaha from the works of Qaliubiya in the book "The Sunni Masterpiece in the Names of the Egyptian Countries" by Ibn Al-Jiaan who surrounded the Egyptian villages after the Nasserite rock that was conducted by the Mamluk Sultan Al-Nasir Muhammad bin Qalawun in 715 AH / 1315AD. In the Ottoman era, its name was in Tarabya in the year 933 AH / 1527 AD, conducted by the Ottoman governor Suleiman Pasha Al-Khadem in the era of the Ottoman Sultan Suleiman the Magnificent Qaha within the villages of Wilayat Qaliubiya, and in the date 1228 AH / 1813 CE, who counted the villages of Egypt after the survey carried out by Muhammad Ali Pasha in the name of Qaha within Qalubia directorate villages.

== Overview ==
Today it is famous for its preserved foods industry and as an industrial and agricultural town. It lies on the rail network that radiates north from Cairo.

Most of the agricultural land on the east of Qaha is famous for its citrus orchards.

== Climate ==
Köppen-Geiger climate classification system classifies its climate as hot desert (BWh), as the rest of Egypt.

Climate data for Qaha
| Month | Jan | Feb | Mar | Apr | May | Jun | Jul | Aug | Sep | Oct | Nov | Dec | Year |
|---|---|---|---|---|---|---|---|---|---|---|---|---|---|
| Mean daily maximum °C (°F) | 19.2 (66.6) | 20.9 (69.6) | 23.7 (74.7) | 27.9 (82.2) | 31.9 (89.4) | 34.3 (93.7) | 34.6 (94.3) | 34.4 (93.9) | 32.3 (90.1) | 29.9 (85.8) | 25.4 (77.7) | 20.8 (69.4) | 27.9 (82.3) |
| Daily mean °C (°F) | 12.9 (55.2) | 14 (57) | 16.6 (61.9) | 19.9 (67.8) | 23.7 (74.7) | 26.4 (79.5) | 27.5 (81.5) | 27.4 (81.3) | 25.3 (77.5) | 23 (73) | 19.3 (66.7) | 14.6 (58.3) | 20.9 (69.5) |
| Mean daily minimum °C (°F) | 6.7 (44.1) | 7.2 (45.0) | 9.5 (49.1) | 12 (54) | 15.6 (60.1) | 18.6 (65.5) | 20.4 (68.7) | 20.4 (68.7) | 18.4 (65.1) | 16.1 (61.0) | 13.2 (55.8) | 8.5 (47.3) | 13.9 (57.0) |
| Average precipitation mm (inches) | 5 (0.2) | 4 (0.2) | 3 (0.1) | 1 (0.0) | 1 (0.0) | 0 (0) | 0 (0) | 0 (0) | 0 (0) | 1 (0.0) | 2 (0.1) | 6 (0.2) | 23 (0.8) |
Source: Climate-Data.org (altitude: m)

== See also ==
- Qaha Chemical Industries
