= Abu Zaabal Specialized Chemicals =

Abu Zaabal Specialized Chemicals Company Military Factory 18
- Company type: Government-owned company
- Industry: Defence and consumer products
- Founded: 1950; 76 years ago
- Headquarters: Abu Zaabal, Qalyubia Governorate, Egypt
- Area served: Egypt
- Key people: Hassan el-Bous (chairman of the factory)
- Owner: Ministry of Military Production
- Parent: National Authority for Military Production
- Website: https://fact18.momp.gov.eg/

The Abu Zaabal Specialized Chemicals Company (Egyptian Arabic: أبو زعبل للكيماويات المتخصصة) or Military Factory 18 (مصنع 18 الحربي), is an Egyptian government joint-stock company, one of the companies of the National Authority for Military Production affiliated with the Ministry of Military Production. It was established in 1950 in the Abu Zaabal area in Qalyubia Governorate. It works in the field of military and civilian industries.

== History ==
Abu Zaabal Specialized Chemicals Company was established in 1950, and in 1959 the company introduced the manufacture of industrial explosives (dynamite) to meet the needs of mines and quarries, as well as the needs of oil exploration and major construction projects.

One of the most notable achievements in this field is the High Dam project, which used 12,000 tons of dynamite produced by the company.

Products were developed to keep pace with the requirements of the local market, such as industrial nitrocellulose for the manufacture of paints, pure edible oil, sunflower and natural palm oil, cotton seed, agricultural fertilizers and industrial detergents for various purposes.

Abu Zaabal's products are at a global level in terms of quality and are ISO 9001 and ISO 45001 certified. The company's export programs cover the Arab countries, the Middle East region and African countries.

Abu Zaabal Specialized Chemicals Company has specialized technical cadres at a high level, where training courses are conducted in the field of blasting technology.

== Products ==
- Dynamite
- Vegetable oil
- Paint
- Fertilizer

== See also ==
- Abu Zaabal Specialized Industries
- Abu Zaabal Engineering Industries
- Armoured Production and Repair Factory
