= Economy of the Egyptian Armed Forces =

Following the Arab Spring, the military tightened its control of the Egyptian economy. Details of the military's role in the economy are unclear given that statistics regarding the economy are absent or known to be wildly inaccurate.

The Involvement of the Egyptian Armed Forces in economic activity generates substantial revenue for the military. Many infrastructure projects, as well as the provision of goods or services, are either run directly by the military or contracts are provided to military affiliated companies. This ranges from construction to provision of food. The impacts of such a tightly controlled and regulated economy are widespread and impact currency value, international investment and the standard of living.

As a result of the competitive advantage experienced by the military over private enterprise, non-military affiliated companies experience an economic handicap. As military affiliated corporations are not required to pay taxes, the VAT and import taxes experienced by civilian organisations further increases the difficulty of operating commercially independent of the Armed Forces.

== Construction and infrastructure ==
Since the Arab Spring in 2011 hundreds of large infrastructure projects have been channelled through the Egyptian Armed Forces Engineering Authority, providing large revenues to the military. While official documentation of the profits from these projects are generally not made public, many billions of Egyptian pounds in revenue have been accumulated. Concerns about the cost-benefit calculations for these major construction projects have raised questions over the military's intervention in the economy. It has been argued that the resources allocated to these projects can be used more efficiently.

=== Suez Canal expansion project ===
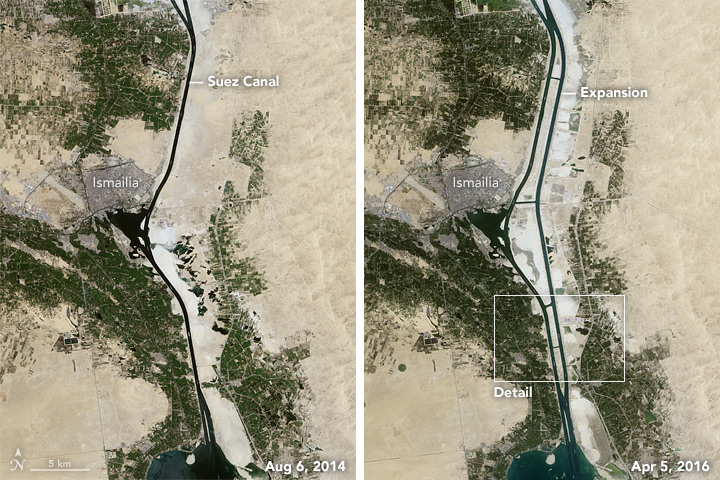
Before and after Suez Canal expansion

The Suez Canal expansion was Egypt's largest infrastructure project in recent years. It involved creating a new shipping lane in the canal and deepening the existing channel to enable vessels to pass in both directions simultaneously. The anticipated financial outcomes of this project have not yet been released.

President Sisi has invested more than $8 bn USD in an expansion of the Suez Canal in an attempt to increase the Canal's revenue by decreasing waiting times for vessels passing through it. The anticipated level of revenue has not been met. One of the main reasons for this sluggish growth in revenues can be traced to the fact that global trade has still not recovered from the 2008 financial crisis. Lieutenant General Mohab Mamish, Chairman of the Suez Canal Authority, said that the canal's annual revenue would surpass $13 billion by 2023. However, revenue has barely increased since the opening of the second lane and in some periods it decreased. Critics suggest that Sisi's regime should have foreseen this, given that the Canal was not working at full capacity before the expansion. Government officials and President Sisi assert that revenue has increased since the expansion, without providing detailed data. It has been argued that given Egypt's economic situation resources should be allocated with care as misallocation may have long lasting negative impacts.

Another reason for the low revenues is the marketing model that the government adopted to promote the new Suez Canal. Large amounts of money were allocated for marketing, but instead of using major international companies to manage the marketing, money was spent in inefficient ways such as in a giant billboard in New York.

=== New capital of Egypt project ===
The military is also involved in the government plan to create a new capital to replace Cairo by 2022. The New Administrative Capital for Urban Development is a company formed by the Egyptian government to oversee the construction of the new capital. The Egyptian military owns 51 percent of this company, while the remaining 49 percent is vested in the state-owned New Urban Communities Authority. Most of the construction costs will be covered by the New Administrative Capital for Urban Development, which will then either sell or rent the developed sites to other parties making it a profitable venture for the Egyptian Military. During the first phase, 3,500 acres of land, for residential, commercial, and administrative uses, were sold to real estate companies. Concerns about the transparency of this process have been raised.

The new capital is planned to cover over 490 square kilometres. However, it will only absorb 6.5 million people by the time the final phase is complete which will leave the population of Cairo at approximately 18 million, given a 2 percent growth rate, by the year 2027. Therefore, most of Cairo's population will remain in Cairo, where resources for maintenance and repairs to the infrastructure are lacking. It has been suggested that available resources are likely to be preferentially deployed to the infrastructure needs of the new capital. The new capital will house a zoo, a wildlife park, an aquarium, an arboretum and botanical gardens, and so require a large quantity of water. The Government has stated that two major pipelines will connect the Nile to the new capital and that at some point a third line will provide desalinated water from the Red Sea. Cairo has suffered from multiple power outages over the past few years and the government has struggled to meet demand. This has raised concerns that the government will prioritise the new capital leaving Cairo's inhabitants with the unsolved issue of power shortages.

== Manufacturing and commodities ==
The Egyptian Pound has experienced a 98% drop in value relative to the US dollar since the start of 1960 with a volatility score of 18.2. The lack of stability combined with rampant devaluation has made it difficult for the private sector to afford imports of basic goods and services. In addition, instead of providing subsidies to support the private sector, the military tends to centralise production or provide contracts specifically to affiliated companies. This occurred in 1977, when President Sadat organised military provision of bread after cutting subsidies, sparking riots across the country .

=== Taxation ===
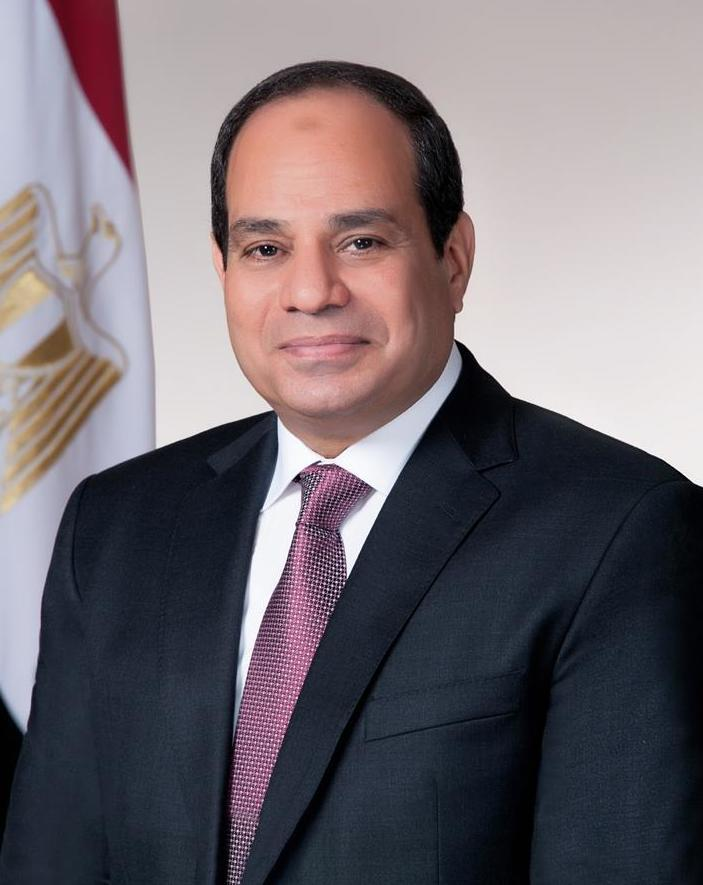
President Abdel Fattah el-Sisi

All companies of the Egyptian Armed Forces are exempt from various state taxes, including income, sales and import taxes. This was extended to property taxes in 2015 by Defense Minister Sedki Sobhi and included military owned supermarkets and hotels. As military recruits are used as cheap labour the cost of production for the military can remain low relative to private enterprise. However, taxes on civilian activities increased in 2016, namely a 13% value added tax on internal trade and various import taxes on hundreds of products of up to 60%. As a result, private enterprises generally have difficulty remaining competitive.

=== Investment ===
The manner in which national leaders prioritise domestic investment has flow on effects to broader international investment. Ever since Sisi consolidated power with the Military, the Egyptian economy has attracted greater international investment. Even though freedoms are sacrificed at times, Sisi firmly believes that economic progress is should be prioritised over all other factors, such as some human rights. Sisi's dissent on opposition and centralisation of power proved to increase the value of international investments. Major international corporations such as BP, Coca-Cola and Majid Al Futtaim intend to collectively invest billions of dollars into the Egyptian economy as a result of Sisi's fiscal and economic reforms. Consequently, Egypt's credit-rating has been rising over the past few years.

However, the authoritarian policies being implemented by Sisi has other implications for stability and foreign investments in the long run. Sisi's crackdown on opposition might have provided temporary boosts where the economy can benefit from investments, however it has also ‘pushed grievances underground’. This way, recent attacks in Sinai and scattered bombings in other parts of the country are not a good indicator of long term stability and economic prosperity.

== Despotic state ==
For the past few hundred years Egypt had different regimes in power, each with its own leadership and unique approaches to the issues facing the country. All have followed the despotic state model where the civil society has little say in how the country is run, while a powerful state rules as it sees fit. The dynamics governing the relation between the state and civil society has remained broadly similar over the past few hundred years for Egypt.

The army has become so powerful that only the army can scrutinise the army's budget. The parliament elected at the end of 2015 lacks any constitutional authority to control or examine the Army's expenditure It has been argued that during the current period of unrest in the region, the military's increasing intervention within the state is necessary for stability. Therefore, any sort of uncertainty in the Egyptian political sphere might negatively impact the economy.

== Protests ==
Numerous protests have occurred in Egypt in an attempt to reduce the degree of military control over the state and associated economy. While these protests have often been successful in changing the political party in power, the high level of military involvement in economic activity generally continues.

=== Arab Spring ===
In the wake of the Arab Spring, the military was seen as restoring order to the Middle East’s largest Arab country. This allowed Egypt to repurpose its security apparatus, making it the sole arbiter of Egypt’s economic and political system at a time when the country was still in transition.

The mass protests of the Arab Spring led to the 11 February 2011 resignation of former Egyptian president Hosni Mubarak and sparked largescale economic changes. Mubarak's National Democratic Party was replaced temporarily by military rule until June 2012 when Mohamed Morsi was elected on behalf of the Muslim Brotherhood. The economic impacts of this transition were extensive and correlated to major changes in military power. The impact can be seen in the Egyptian stock market, where the end of Mubarak's reign saw a 13% drop in the value of stocks connected to the National Democratic Party relative to non-connected stocks over the nine trading days following his fall. In particular, military connected companies experienced major gains during this period since Mubarak's fall was seen by many as the result of a lack of military support.
