= Khusus =

Khusus ϯⲕⲁⲗⲁⲃⲓ
- City
- Location in Egypt
- Coordinates: 30.160093°N 31.313349°E
- Country: Egypt
- Governorate: Qalyubiyya

Area
  - Total: 7.73 km^{2} (2.98 sq mi)

Population (2023)
  - Total: 502,864
  - Density: 65,100/km^{2} (168,000/sq mi)
- Time zone: UTC+2 (EET)
  - Summer (DST): UTC+3 (EEST)

Khusus (Arabic: الخصوص, Coptic: ϯⲕⲁⲗⲁⲃⲓ) is a city in the Qalyubiyya Governorate, Egypt. The city lies north of Cairo. Its population was estimated at 502,864 people in 2023.
