= Al-Maasara Engineering Industries =

Al-Maasara Engineering Industries Company Military Factory 45
- Company type: Government-owned company
- Founded: 1952; 74 years ago
- Headquarters: Al-Maasara, Helwan, Cairo Governorate, Egypt
- Area served: Egypt
- Key people: Abdel Moneim Hindawi (Factory Head)
- Owner: Ministry of Military Production
- Parent: National Authority for Military Production
- Website: https://fact45.momp.gov.eg/

The Al-Maasara Engineering Industries Company (Arabic: شركة المعصرة للصناعات الهندسية) or Military Factory 45 (Arabic: مصنع 45 الحربي) is an Egyptian government joint-stock company, one of the companies of the National Authority for Military Production affiliated with the Ministry of Military Production. It was established in 1952 on an area of 97 acres in the al-Maasara area in Helwan, Cairo Governorate and was opened on 4 August 1954, in order to produce ammunition of various types for the benefit of the Egyptian Armed Forces, it is currently working in the field of producing meters for electricity, water, natural gas, chemicals for civil works, and light metal industries.

== Products ==
- Electricity, water and natural gas meters
- Hazardous waste incinerators
- Household chemicals

== See also ==
- Abu Zaabal Engineering Industries
