= Hoda Abdel Moneim =

Egyptian lawyer and human rights defender

Hoda Abdul Moneim (born 1960) is an Egyptian human rights lawyer, activist and a member of the board of directors of the Egyptian Coordination for Rights and Freedom and a former member of National Council for Human Rights in Egypt. She was arbitrarily arrested in November 2018 without a warrant of arrest and taken to an unknown location, held incommunicado for 21 days. Following her trial, she was sentenced to five years in prison and another five years probationary sentence with an order to spend every night of the five years at police station.

== Arrest and enforced disappearance ==
Moneim, a prominent opposition member was arrested from her home in Cairo on November 1, 2018, after security forces broke into her home at 1 a.m. during the wave of arrests of over 40 human rights activists and lawyers that started late October 2018. No warrant was presented for her arrest but forcefully taken and disappeared for 21 days. She reappeared at the State Security Prosecution in Cairo for her trial on 21 November 2018 where she was accused of “joining an illegal group” and “inciting harm to the national economy”. The SSP then ordered her pre-trial detention and held at Al Qanater Female Prison without access to her lawyer and family members. Her health condition deteriorated and suffered a heart attack in the prison in January 2020.

On 17 March 2021, MENA Rights Group and six other organizations requested the UN Special Rapporteur on human rights defenders and the UN Special Rapporteur on counterterrorism to prevail on the Egyptian authorities for the release of Moneim to reduce her risk of exposure to COVID-19 due to her ill health. In August 2021, after three years of imprisonment without charges and trial, her case was transferred to Emergency State Security Court in Cairo where she was charged with “joining and financing a terrorist organization, and alleging and broadcasting false news impacting peace and security”. On 5 March 2023, she was convicted of all the charges and sentenced to five years in prison and another five years of supervised parole in which she would spend every night at police station. Judgement of the Emergency State Security Court is not appealable but only the president has the power to rescind or modify the judgment through a plea submitted to president.
