= El Qanater El Khayreya =

El Qanater El Khayreya القناطر الخيرية
- Town
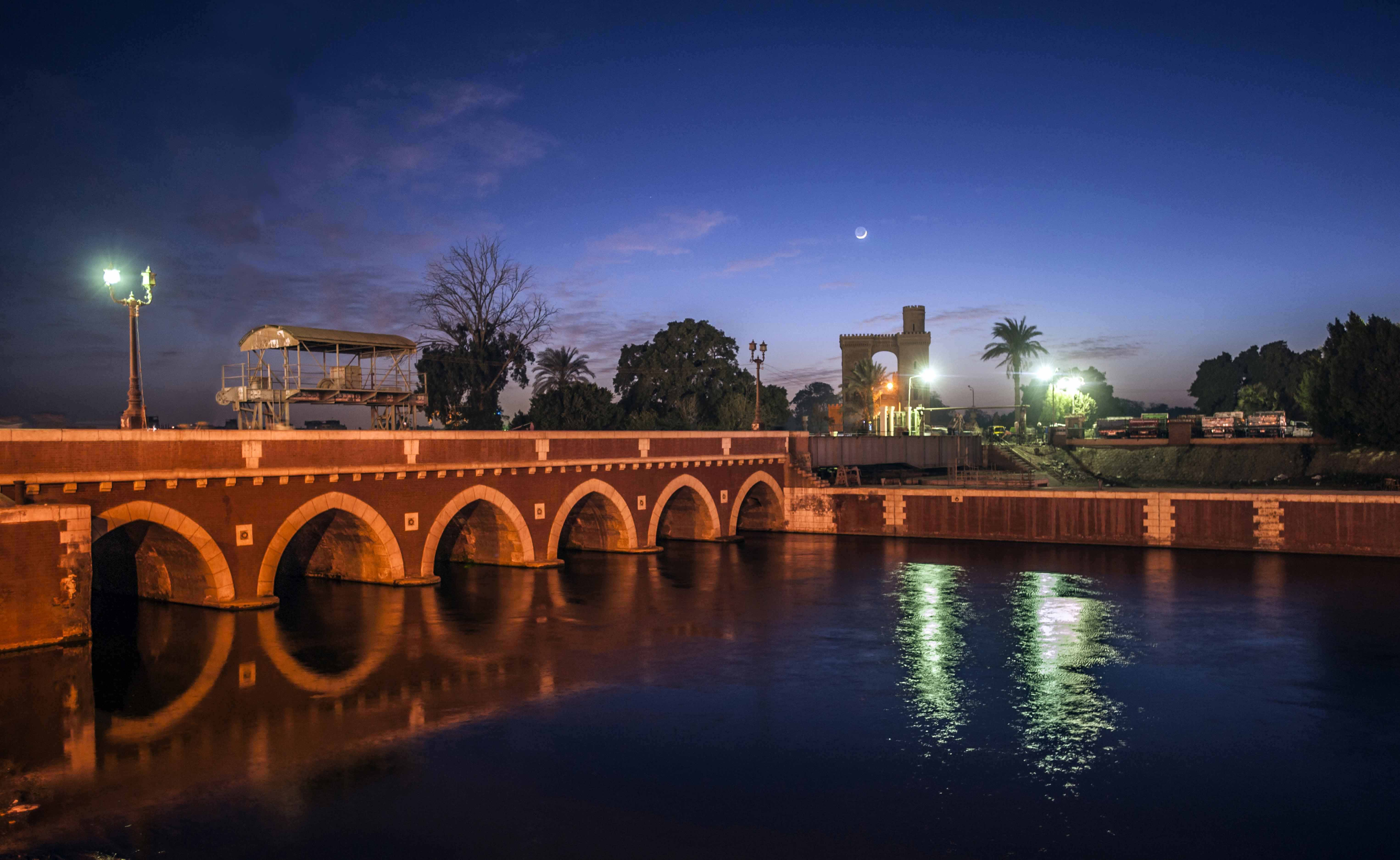

- Location in Egypt
- Coordinates: 30.193583°N 31.132064°E
- Country: Egypt
- Governorate: Qalyubia
- Established: mid 1850s
- Founder: Viceroy Sa'id Pasha

Area
  - Total: 11.8 km^{2} (4.6 sq mi)
- Elevation: 20 m (66 ft)

Population (2023)
  - Total: 85,958
  - Density: 7,280/km^{2} (18,900/sq mi)
- Time zone: UTC+2 (EET)
  - Summer (DST): UTC+3 (EEST)
- Postal code: 13621

El Qanater El Khayreya (Egyptian Arabic: القناطر الخيرية pronounced [elʔɑˈnɑːtˤeɾ elxæjˈɾejjæ], meaning "the Benevolent Bridges") is a city and a markaz in Qalyubia Governorate, Egypt. It is the location of the Delta Barrages, the first modern irrigation structure across the Nile, located at the apex of the Nile Delta. In the mid 1850s, when Khedive Sa'id Pasha took over project construction, he ordered a silver medal to be struck to mark the occasion. He then ordered the construction of a town near the incomplete barrage.

Again the project would be bogged down due to financial problems; the original barrages were initially completed in 1862. A new barrage structure was built slightly downstream in 1939. The name of the city is a reference to the structure and the river crossing it.

== Geography ==
=== Climate ===
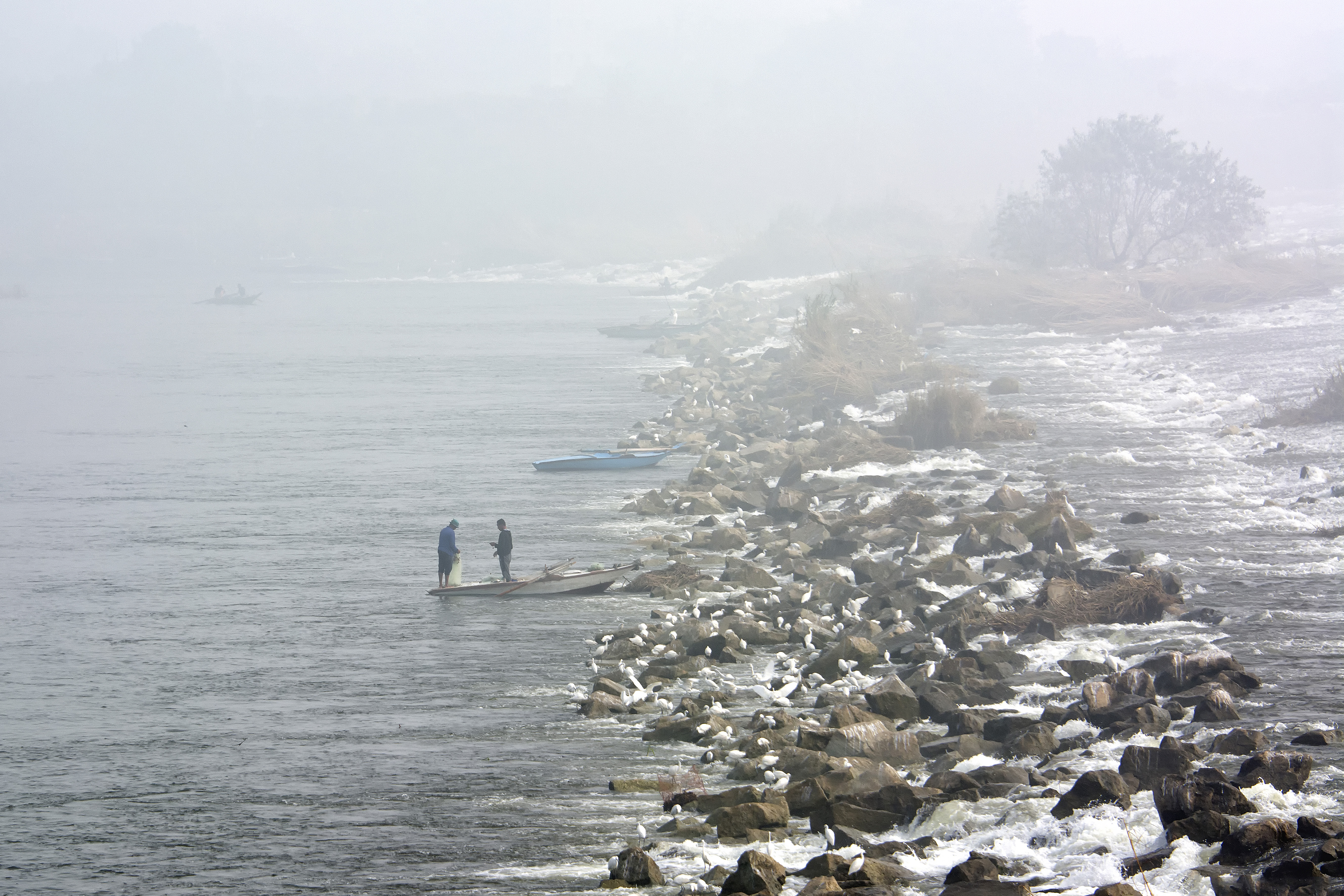
Foggy day in November 2019.

Köppen climate classification system classifies its climate as hot desert (BWh), as the rest of Egypt.

Climate data for El Qanater el Khayreyya
| Month | Jan | Feb | Mar | Apr | May | Jun | Jul | Aug | Sep | Oct | Nov | Dec | Year |
|---|---|---|---|---|---|---|---|---|---|---|---|---|---|
| Mean daily maximum °C (°F) | 19.4 (66.9) | 20.9 (69.6) | 23.6 (74.5) | 27.9 (82.2) | 31.9 (89.4) | 34.3 (93.7) | 34.6 (94.3) | 34.4 (93.9) | 32.2 (90.0) | 30 (86) | 25.4 (77.7) | 21 (70) | 28.0 (82.4) |
| Daily mean °C (°F) | 13 (55) | 13.9 (57.0) | 16.5 (61.7) | 19.9 (67.8) | 23.8 (74.8) | 26.4 (79.5) | 27.5 (81.5) | 27.4 (81.3) | 25.2 (77.4) | 23.1 (73.6) | 19.1 (66.4) | 14.8 (58.6) | 20.9 (69.6) |
| Mean daily minimum °C (°F) | 6.6 (43.9) | 7 (45) | 9.4 (48.9) | 12 (54) | 15.7 (60.3) | 18.5 (65.3) | 20.5 (68.9) | 20.4 (68.7) | 18.3 (64.9) | 16.2 (61.2) | 12.9 (55.2) | 8.6 (47.5) | 13.8 (57.0) |
| Average precipitation mm (inches) | 4 (0.2) | 5 (0.2) | 3 (0.1) | 1 (0.0) | 1 (0.0) | 0 (0) | 0 (0) | 0 (0) | 0 (0) | 1 (0.0) | 2 (0.1) | 5 (0.2) | 22 (0.8) |
Source: Climate-Data.org (altitude: 18m)
