= Qaha Chemical Industries =

Egyptian governmental joint-stock company

Qaha Chemical Industries Company Military Factory 270
- Company type: Government-owned company
- Industry: Defence and consumer goods
- Founded: 23 May 1956; 70 years ago
- Headquarters: Qaha, Qalyubia Governorate, Egypt
- Area served: Egypt
- Key people: Walid Rasmi (Chairman)
- Owner: Ministry of Military Production
- Parent: National Authority for Military Production
- Website: https://fact270.momp.gov.eg/

The Qaha Chemical Industries Company (Egyptian Arabic: شركة قها للصناعات الكيماوية) or Military Factory 270 (مصنع 270 الحربي) is an Egyptian governmental joint-stock company, one of the companies of the National Authority for Military Production affiliated with the Ministry of Military Production. It was established on 23 May 1956 in the city of Qaha in Qalyubia Governorate on an area of 88 acres, with the aim of covering the needs of the Egyptian Armed Forces for weapons and ammunition.

== History ==
The company was opened on May 23, 1956, and it was opened at that time by Major General Abdel Hamid Nemat, Permanent Undersecretary of the Ministry of War at that time, on behalf of the Minister of War and Commander-in-Chief of the Armed Forces at that time.

The celebration was attended, according to al-Jumhuryah newspaper's opening news publication on May 24, 1956, by Major General Hassan Rajab, Undersecretary of War for Factories Affairs, and a number of officers and civilians. Major General Hassan Rajab said during the opening speech: “Today we are celebrating the opening of this factory, which is a new link added to the chain of military production.. This edifice is strengthening and flourishing over time to meet the growing needs of the armed forces and the heavy burdens placed on them in defending this part of the world.”

He added: "Today, military factories have begun to revolve in a broader orbit than the one in which they began their movement. Today, they are studying a project for close cooperation with the rest of the military factories and laboratories throughout the Arab nation, which will allow the nation to complete its unity and prepare for the important role that it will play in the near future, God willing, as one of the main forces with a loud voice in shaping the politics of the world in which we live.”

Engineer Ahmad Kamel al-Badry, founder of the factory and its first director, gave his speech explaining the method of production in the factory, and said: “All the workers who work in it are Egyptians.”

== Products ==
- Well water treatment plants, surface water purification, seawater desalination, and groundwater desalination
- Wastewater treatment plants
- Water meters
- Dry batteries of all types.
- Liquid batteries
- Shoe varnish (Qaha), liquid, all colors, (shiny) all colors.
- Adhesives (Art Fix)
- Aluminum tubes for filling pastes

== International quality certificates ==
- ISO 9001 certification in the field of design, assembly, installation and after-sales service of water purification plants
- ISO 9002 certification in the field of manufacturing, production and after-sales service of water meters
- ISO 9002 certification in the field of manufacturing, production and after-sales service for dry batteries
- ISO 14001 certificate
- OHSAS 18001 certificate

== See also ==
- Abu Zaabal Specialized Chemicals
