= National Service Products Organization =

Egyptian manufacturer of military products

- Native name: جهاز مشروعات الخدمة الوطنية
- Type: Government agency
- Founded: 1979; 47 years ago
- Headquarters: Cairo, Egypt
- Area served: Egypt
- Key people: Walid Abu El-Magd (Director)
- Services: Investment and manufacturing
- Owner: Ministry of Defense
- Subsidiaries: 41
- Website: http://www.nspo.com.eg/index%20-data.html

The National Service Projects Organization (NSPO) manufactures military and civilian products and provide contracting services.

It is subordinate to the Egyptian Ministry of Defense system, was its establishment in accordance with Presidential Decree No. 32 of 1979 under President Anwar Sadat, and describes a device aimed at the "achievement of relative self-sufficiency of the main needs of the armed forces to ease the burden of management of the burden of the state with the introduction of excess production capacities in the local market and help in state economic development projects through a sophisticated industrial base productivity.

== Subsidiaries ==
The company has a number of subsidiaries in a range of industries:

- 1976 - El-Nasr Company for Intermediate Chemicals
- 1982 - Arab International Optronics (AIO)
- 1986 - Egg Production Complex
- 1988 - El-Nasr company for services & maintenance (Queen service)
- 1993 - The National Company for petroleum
- 1993 - Plastic Rolls factory
- 1994 - National Co. for General Construction & supplies
- 1996 - National Co. for Natural Water in Siwa (SAFI)
- 1996 - National Co. for Food Industry in Rafah
- 1998 - Upper Egypt Company for agricultural industry & land Reclamation
- 1999 - National Company for Land Reclamation & agriculture in East Owainat
- 2002 - The National Company for roads building and development
- 2012 - El-Areesh company for cement
- 2013 - Queen Company for Macaroni
- 2014 - National Company for Fishery and Aquaculture
- 2015 - National Company for Refrigerating & Transportation
- 2015 - National Company for Batteries
- 2016 - Egyptian Black Sand Company

== See also ==
- Economy of the Egyptian Armed Forces
