= National Authority for Military Production =

- Formation: 1984; 42 years ago
- Type: Government body
- Headquarters: Governmental District, New Administrative Capital, Egypt
- Location: Egypt
- Region served: Egypt
- Owner: Ministry of Military Production
- Chairman: Mohamed Salah Mostafa
- Vice Chairman and Managing Director: Emil Helmy Elias
- Main organ: Board of Directors of the National Military Production Authority.
- Website: https://www.momp.gov.eg/
- Formerly called: Egyptian General Organization for Military Factories and Aircraft Industry.

The National Authority for Military Production or National Organisation for Military Production (Egyptian Arabic: الهيئة القومية للإنتاج الحربي) is an Egyptian body with a legal personality affiliated with the Ministry of Military Production. It was established pursuant to Law No. 6 of 1984 to become one of the pillars of the military industry in Egypt through its supervision of military factories. It was previously called the Egyptian General Organisation for Military Factories and Aircraft Industry before changing to its current name.

== Board of Directors ==
The Board of Directors of the Authority is formed by a decision of the Prime Minister of Egypt, headed by the Minister of Military Production and is composed of:

- A vice chairman and managing director
- A commander from the Egyptian Air Force
- A commander from the Egyptian Air Defense Forces
- The chairman of the Egyptian Armaments Authority
- A representative from the Ministry of Military Production
- Two chairmen from the boards of directors of companies affiliated with the authority or individuals in senior management positions within it.
- Three experts with proven competence and experience in technical, financial, economic, or legal affairs.

== Affiliated companies ==
- Abu Qir Engineering Industries
- Abu Zaabal Engineering Industries
- Abu Zaabal Specialized Chemicals
- Abu Zaabal Specialized Industries
- Al-Maasara Engineering Industries
- Armoured Production and Repair Factory
- Benha Electronics
  - Thales & Benha Electronics
- Heliopolis Chemical Industries
- Helwan Castings
- Helwan Diesel Engines
- Helwan Engineering Industries
- Helwan Machinery and Equipment
- Helwan Metal Hardware
- Helwan Non-Ferrous Industries
- Military Production Co. for Engineering Projects & Consultation
- Qaha Chemical Industries
- Shubra Engineering Industries

== Minority shares in other companies ==
- Tharwa Petroleum: 5%
- IPIC: 10%
- Water Desalination and Treatment Plants Manufacturing Company
- Egyptian National Pharmaceuticals: 10%
- Al-Maasara Gas Metro: 24%

== Heads of the Authority ==
- Mohamed Salah Mostafa
- Mohammad El Assar
- Ibrahim Younis.
- Reda Hafez
- Ali Sabry
- Sayed Mishal
- Mohammad El Ghamrawi

== See also ==
- Arab Organization for Industrialization
