= Armoured Production and Repair Factory =

Armoured Production and Repair Factory Military Factory 200 Abu Zaabal Factory
- Company type: Government-owned company
- Industry: Defence
- Founded: 1987; 39 years ago
- Headquarters: Abu Zaabal, Qalyubia Governorate, Egypt
- Area served: Egypt
- Key people: Yousry El Nemr (Chairman)
- Owner: Ministry of Military Production
- Parent: National Authority for Military Production
- Website: fact200.momp.gov.eg

The Armoured Production and Repair Factory (Egyptian Arabic: مصنع إنتاج وإصلاح المدرعات) or Military Factory 200 (Egyptian Arabic: مصنع 200 الحربي) is an Egyptian government joint-stock company, one of the companies of the National Authority for Military Production, affiliated with the Ministry of Military Production. It was established in 1987 in the Abu Zaabal area of Qalyubia Governorate on an area of 2.5 million square metres, as a result of the agreement concluded between the Egyptian government and the United States government for the joint production of the American M1A1 Abrams main battle tank, where the first tank was produced at the factory in 1992, and the factory continued production until it produced more than 1,000 tanks of this type for the Egyptian Armed Forces.

== Products ==
- M1A1 Abrams main battle tank
- M88A2 ARV
- K9A1EGY SPH
- ST-100 APC
- ST-500 APC
- Uparmord M113 APC (SIFV)
- SENA 200 IFV
- Egyptian Infantry Fighting Vehicle IFV
- RAAD 200 MLRS
- 635NL trailer
- Foton electric bus

== See also ==
- M1A1 tank coproduction program in Egypt
