= Egyptian Armaments Authority =

- هيئة تسليح القوات المسلحة المصرية

Agency overview
- Formed: 1967; 58 years ago
- Headquarters: Cairo, Egypt
- Agency executive: Staff Major General / Kamal Wafa, CEO

The Egyptian Armaments Authority (EAA) is one of the bodies of the Egyptian Armed Forces, and was previously known as the Technical Authority.

== Establishment ==
It was established on November 2, 1967, by a decision of President Gamal Abdel Nasser, headed by Major General Abdel Hamid Mahmoud, who was entrusted with establishing and organizing this body for the first time in the history of the armed forces. It was called the Technical Authority, and its goal was to rebuild and organize the forces: Land - Air - Sea - Air Defense and other branches of the armed forces to increase their technical efficiency.

== Affiliated facilities ==
- Military Technological College.
- Military basic technical schools.

== Heads of the Authority ==
- Staff Major General / Kamal Wafa
- Staff Major General / Osama Ezzat
- Staff Major General / Tarek Saad Zaghloul
- Staff Major General / Abdel Mohsen Mosa
- Staff Major General / Mahammad Al-Assar
- Staff Major General / Tawfiq Mukhtar
- Staff Major General / Gamal Sidqi (Head of the Armed Forces Technical Authority)
- Staff Major General / Abdel Hamid Mahmoud (Head of the Armed Forces Technical Authority)
