= Ministry of Military Production (Egypt) =

Government ministry of Egypt

Coordinates: 30°2′21″N 31°14′14″E

- وزارة الإنتاج الحربي

Agency overview
- Jurisdiction: Government of Egypt
- Headquarters: New Administrative Capital
- Minister responsible: Mahammad Salah Mostafa
- Website: www.momp.gov.eg

The Egyptian Ministry of Military Production is responsible for managing the development and operation of military factories in the Egyptian Republic and now chaired by Major General Mahammad Salah el-Din Mostafa, who took over the ministry within the ministry of Mostafa Madbouly in 14 August 2022.

== History ==
The urgent need to rely in the field of armaments on Egyptian national manufacturing arose as a result of the negative effects that resulted from the 1948 Palestine War and the issues of corrupt weapons that ignited the flame of national feeling during the years preceding the July 23 Revolution. The Ministry of War formed a technical administration from the most efficient weapons and ammunition officers, as well as from Maintenance Corps. Cooperation with Egypt was organized without preconditions in the field of supplying the equipment and machinery needed to build munitions factories, which were planned to begin military production.

In 1951, the Supreme Council for Military Factories was established to play a central planning role and be responsible for developing Egyptian military industries and establishing industries feeding them.

== Affiliated bodies ==
- National Authority for Military Production
  - Abu Qir Engineering Industries
  - Abu Zaabal Engineering Industries
  - Abu Zaabal Specialized Chemicals
  - Abu Zaabal Specialized Industries
  - Al-Maasara Engineering Industries
  - Armoured Production and Repair Factory
  - Benha Electronics
    - Thales & Benha Electronics
  - Heliopolis Chemical Industries
  - Helwan Castings
  - Helwan Diesel Engines
  - Helwan Engineering Industries
  - Helwan Machinery and Equipment
  - Helwan Metal Hardware
  - Helwan Non-Ferrous Industries
  - Military Production Co. for Engineering Projects & Consultation
  - Qaha Chemical Industries
  - Shubra Engineering Industries

== Affiliated centers ==
- Technical Institute for Developed Industries.
- Center for Information and Computer Systems.
- Center of Scientific and Technological Excellence.
- Helwan Medical Center.
- Egyptian Academy of Advanced Engineering and Technology.
- Technical school for dual education.
- El Entag El Harby SC.

== Ministers ==
- Abdel Wahab el-Beshry (1966-1969)
- Mahammad Ibrahim Selim (1971-1972)
- Ahmad Kamel el-Badry (1972-1976)
- Gamal el-Din Sedki (1976-1977)
- Abdel Sattar Mogahd Arafa (1978)
- Kamal Tawfiq Nassar (1978-1980)
- Gamal el-Sayed Ibrahim (1980-1993)
- Mahammad el-Ghamrawi (1993-1999)
- Sayed Mishal (1999-2011)
- Ali Sabry (2011-2012)
- Reda Hafez (2012-2014)
- Ibrahim Younis (2014-2015)
- Mahammad el-Assar (2015-2020)
- Mahammad Ahmad Morsi (2020)
- Mahammad Salah el-Din Mostafa (2022-present)
