= Abu Zaabal Engineering Industries =

Abu Zaabal Engineering Industries Company Military Factory 100
- Company type: Government-owned company
- Industry: Defence and consumer products
- Founded: 1974; 52 years ago
- Headquarters: Abu Zaabal, Qalyubia Governorate, Egypt
- Area served: Egypt
- Key people: Abdel Hakim Shawqi (Chairman)
- Owner: Ministry of Military Production
- Parent: National Authority for Military Production
- Website: fact100.momp

The Abu Zaabal Engineering Industries Company (Egyptian Arabic: أبو زعبل للصناعات الهندسية) or Military Factory 100 (مصنع 100 الحربي), is an Egyptian government joint-stock company, one of the companies of the National Authority for Military Production affiliated with the Ministry of Military Production. It was established in 1974 and reopened in 1983 in the Abu Zaabal area of Qalyubia Governorate on an area of approximately 730 acres with the aim of securing the needs of the Egyptian Armed Forces for types of artillery (medium and heavy).

== Products ==
- Medium and heavy artillery
- Production of tank guns
- Production of special steel, especially weapons steel
- Production of a quick-constructed storm bridge with a load of 70 tons
- Production of the 155 GH 52 howitzer
- Alloy steel rolling mill production
- 120 mm weapon set for the M1A1 tank
- 122 mm howitzer D-30
- ZU-23-2
- M59 radar dome
- Rust-resistant water and fuel tanks
