= Qalyubiyya Governorate =

Governorate of Egypt

Qalyubia Governorate
- Governorate
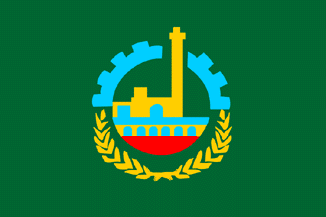
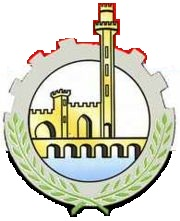
- Flag

- Qalyubia Governorate on the map of Egypt
- Coordinates: 30.41°N 31.21°E
- Country: Egypt
- Seat: Benha

Government
  - Governor: Ayman Attiyya

Area
  - Total: 1,124 km^{2} (434 sq mi)

Population (January 2024)
  - Total: 6,217,766
  - Density: 5,532/km^{2} (14,330/sq mi)

GDP
  - Total: EGP 339 billion (US$ 21.6 billion)
- Time zone: UTC+2 (EGY)
  - Summer (DST): UTC+3 (EEST)
- HDI (2021): 0.735 high · 11th
- Website: www.qaliobia.gov.eg

Qalyubia (Arabic: محافظة القليوبية Moḥāfaẓat El Qalyubiyya Egyptian Arabic pronunciation: [elʔæljoˈbejjæ]) is one of the governorates of Egypt, located in Lower Egypt. It is situated north of Cairo in the Nile Delta region. Its capital is Banha.

== Name ==
Qalyubia is derived from the city of Qalyub, whose name is an arabization of Calliope (Ancient Greek: Καλλιόπη, romanized: Kalliópē), the Muse of epic poetry in Greek mythology.

== Geography ==
Banha and several other settlements blend into the neighboring Cairo Governorate; as a result, parts of Qalyubia (particularly Shubra El Kheima) are generally considered to form part of the Greater Cairo metropolitan area (along with Cairo governorate, Giza city and 6 October City).

Historical population
Year	Pop.	±%
1937	610,157	—
1947	693,908	+13.7%
1957	758,000	+9.2%
1966	1,212,000	+59.9%
1976	1,674,006	+38.1%
1986	2,514,244	+50.2%
1996	3,302,860	+31.4%
2006	4,237,003	+28.3%
2015	5,105,972	+20.5%
2024	6,217,766	+21.8%
1937–2023, 2015 is an estimate

== Municipal divisions ==
The governorate is divided into the following municipal divisions for administrative purposes, with a total estimated population as of January 2024 of 6,217,766. In some instances there is a markaz and a kism with the same name.

Municipal Divisions
Anglicized name	Native name	Arabic transliteration	Population (January 2023 Est.)	Type
Khanka	قسم الخانكه	Al-Khānkah	83,420	Kism (fully urban)
Khanka	مركز الخانكة	Al-Khānkah	618,189	Markaz
Khusus	قسم الخصوص	Al-Khuṣūṣ	499,514	Kism (fully urban)
El Qanater El Khayreya	مركز القناطر الخيرية	Al-Qanāṭir al-Khayriyah	546,560	Markaz
El Ubour	قسم العبور	Al-'Ubūr	142,003	Kism (fully urban)
Banha	مركز بنها	Banhā	519,640	Markaz
Banha 1	قسم اول بنها	Banhā 1	116,113	Kism (fully urban)
Banha 2	قسم ثان بنها	Banhā 2	70,105	Kism (fully urban)
Kafr Shukr	مركز كفر شكر	Kafr Shukr	203,522	Markaz
Qaha	قسم قها	Qahā	51,917	Kism (urban and rural parts)
Qalyub	قسم قليوب	Qalyūb	159,760	Kism (fully urban)
Qalyub	مركز قليوب	Qalyūb	603,868	Markaz
Shubra El Kheima 1	قسم أول شبرا الخيمة	Shubrā al-Khaymah 1	525,812	Kism (fully urban)
Shubra El Kheima 2	قسم ثان شبرا الخيمة	Shubrā al-Khaymah 2	741,395	Kism (fully urban)
Shibin El Qanater	مركز شبين القناطر	Sibīn al-Qanāṭir	581,892	Markaz
Tukh	مركز طوخ	Ṭūkh	639,329	Markaz

== Population ==
According to population estimates, in 2015 the majority of residents in the governorate lived in rural areas, with an urbanization rate of only 44.7%. Out of an estimated 5,105,972 people residing in the governorate, 2,825,045 people lived in rural areas as opposed to only 2,280,927 in urban areas.

== Cities ==
The cities in the Qalyubia Governorate are:

- Banha
- El-Khankah
- Qaha
- Qalyub
- Shibin El Qanater
- Shubra El Kheima
- Tukh
- El Qanater El Khayreya
- Kafr Shukr
- Obour City
- Khusus

== Industrial zones ==
According to the Governing Authority for Investment and Free Zones (GAFI), the following industrial zones are located in Qalyubiyya:

Zone name
El Sherouq Industrial Zone (Abu Zaabal)
El Safa Industrial Zone for Foundries (El Zahar Area)
El Aqrasha Industrial Zone

== Economy ==
Qalyubia is known for its agricultural production of crops, fruits and vegetables. The most important of these crops include maize, cotton, wheat, citrus fruits, bananas, oranges and apricots. Qalyubia is also the leading Egyptian governorate in the production of poultry and eggs.

== Programs and projects ==
In 1981, the Basic Village Service Program (BVS) had several water projects going on in the Qalyubia Governorate.

In a program that began on August 28, 2012 (through 2018), the European Union invested 40 million Euros on upgrading the infrastructure of informal areas in Qalyubia Governorate.
