= Agreement between Great Britain and Portugal Relating to the Suppression of the Capitulations in Egypt =

1920 treaty between the United Kingdom and Portugal

The Agreement between Great Britain and Portugal Relating to the Suppression of the Capitulations in Egypt (1920) was an agreement concluded between the British and Portuguese governments in Lisbon on 9 December 1920, in order to regulate legal relations between Portuguese citizens and the court system in Egypt. Ratifications were exchanged in Lisbon on 29 September 1921 and the agreement went into effect. It was registered in the League of Nations Treaty Series on 12 December 1921.

== Background ==
The capitulations system had been introduced into the legal system of the Ottoman Empire and some other Middle Eastern countries as a result of Western pressure. This system provided that in case a foreign citizen was charged with a crime, he or she would not be tried by the local legal system, but by a special court to consist of foreign judges in accordance with his country's laws.

The capitulations system also prevailed in Egypt, which was under British rule from 1882 onward. Following the First World War, pressure mounted on the British authorities in Egypt to grant greater freedom of action to the Egyptian government in matters of control over its own legal system. As a result, the British government agreed to modify some legal arrangements.

== Terms of the agreement ==
Article 1 stipulated for the renunciation by the Portuguese government of its privileges under the Capitulations system. Article 2 provided for the termination of all Portuguese consular courts, except for those dealing with current cases. Article 3 stipulated that Portuguese citizens in Egypt shall enjoy the same privileges as British citizens. Article 4 stipulated that Portuguese consular agents shall retain their diplomatic privileges as before. Article 5 determined which Anglo-Portuguese treaties shall remain valid under the new arrangements.

== See also ==
- Agreement between Great Britain and Denmark Relating to the Suppression of the Capitulations in Egypt (1921)
- Agreement between Great Britain and Greece Relating to the Suppression of the Capitulations in Egypt (1920)
- Agreement between Great Britain and Norway Relating to the Suppression of the Capitulations in Egypt (1921)
- Agreement between Great Britain and Sweden Relating to the Suppression of the Capitulations in Egypt (1921)
- Montreux Convention Regarding the Abolition of the Capitulations in Egypt
