= Law of Egypt =

The law of Egypt is primarily based on the Napoleonic Code, with additional influences from British and traditional Shari'a law. It has been the inspiration for the civil code of numerous other Middle Eastern jurisdictions, including Jordan, Bahrain, Qatar, pre-dictatorship kingdoms of Libya and Iraq, and the commercial code of Kuwait.

Egypt's current constitution took effect on 18 January 2014, following several previous constitutions. The Constitution of Egypt is the fundamental law of the country. Egypt is notable for having maintained an unbroken judicial system from 1875 to the present day through several forms of government, although not without significant reforms.

== History ==
=== Muhammad 'Ali Reforms the Vilayet ===
After Muhammad 'Ali came to power and began centralizing the Egyptian government, he implemented a number of reforming programs aimed at modernizing the Egyptian legal system. Students missions were sent to Europe in order to acquire modern educations, and a number of European legal codes such as the French Civil Code were translated into Arabic at this time.

The Qanun al-Filaha, enacted in 1830, was one of Muhammad 'Ali's first pieces of criminal legislation. It established state penalties for theft, robbery and homicide. State courts called sisyasa majalis, loosely "political councils", enforced these penalties. These were not an independent judiciary as they were staffed with state administrators, and the Khedive could ultimately overrule decisions made by these courts. These courts worked in tandem with the traditional Shari'a courts, as would become typical in the larger Ottoman world, although this legal pluralism would be introduced later in the core Anatolian territories.

Shari'a law has extremely strict standards of evidence, which would often lead to qadis being unable to convict individuals who were largely considered guilty. The state courts acted as a dual judiciary, where the state would review cases where the qadi could not convict from the perspective of the public interest. In cases such as homicide, assault, and offenses against ones honor (e.g. defamation and crimes of a sexual nature), aggrieved parties would as a rule see both the state courts and the qadi, the state courts having the ability to sentence defendants in cases where Shari'a law demanded an unachievable standard of evidence whilst the defendant was guilty beyond a reasonable doubt. All punishments including execution were carried out by the state, with the exception of flogging. The state was viewed as having the general authority to punish sinful behavior on strength of the ta'zir, which ensured that criminals weren't let go on evidential technicalities while preserving the authority of Shari'a courts.

The role of Muftis would become increasingly bureaucratized, with the office of Grand Mufti imposing a unified interpretation of Hanafi jurisprudence on all state agencies. The Grand Mufti would review cases heard by muftis in state agencies, and through laws which implemented judicial oversight on Shari'a courts would issue binding fatwas on the qadis whose rulings were disputed, acting as a supreme court when disputes over rulings arose.

In the latter half of the nineteenth century, the state courts would evolve into a multi-tiered legal system which worked in tandem with Shari'a courts. These courts heard civil and criminal cases, and were staffed by muftis and ulama. The previous two-step dual judiciary was sometimes abridged into a single trial where both the secular council and the qadi heard the case and gave their rulings at the same time.

=== Khedivate of Egypt under British occupation ===
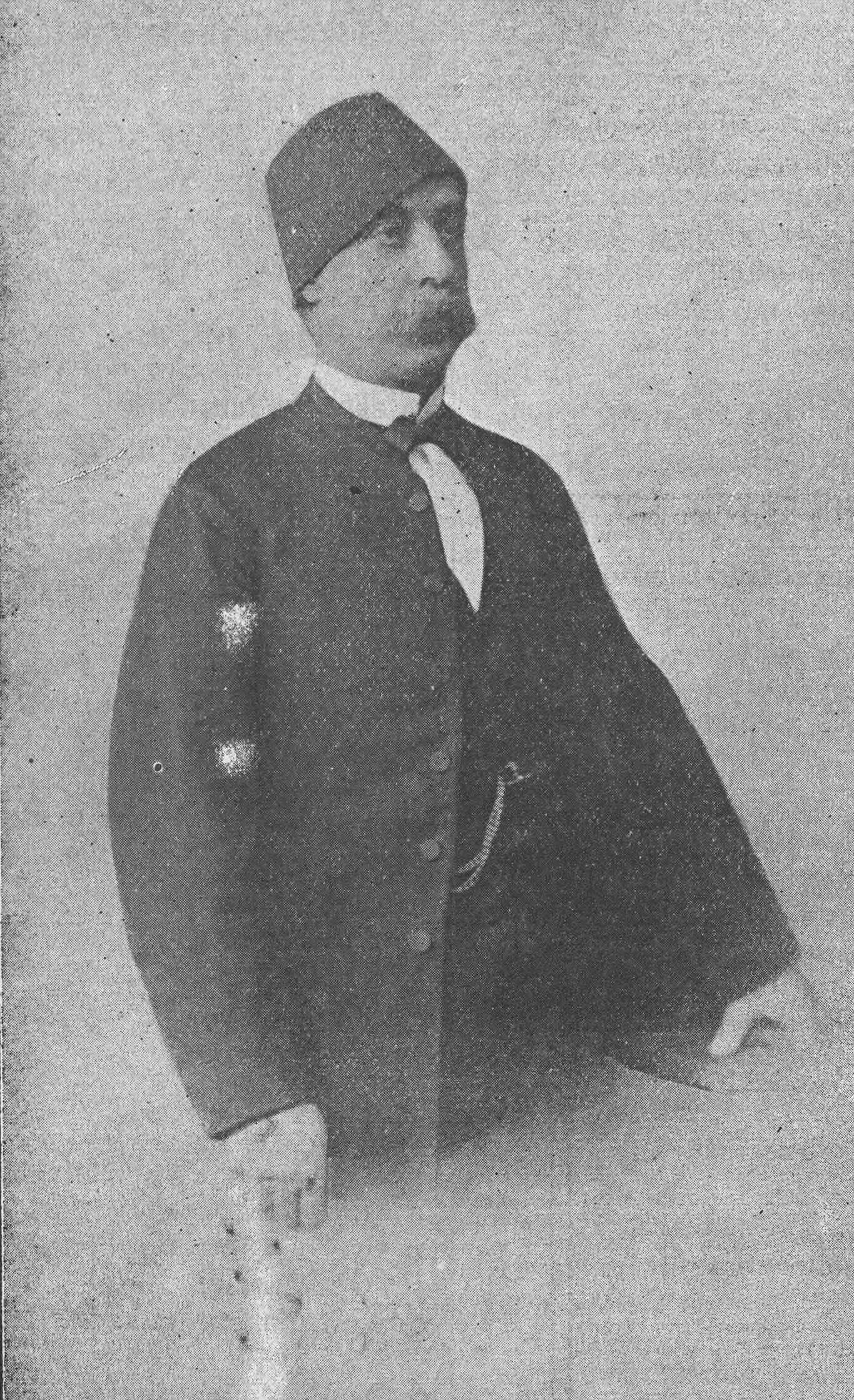
Nubar Pasha, the creator of the Mixed Courts which mark the beginning of the civil Egyptian legal tradition

The modern legal system of Egypt began in 1875 with the creation of the Mixed Courts, which were made to hear cases involving foreigners in Egypt and used the Napoleonic Code as the basis of their laws. These courts were composed of both foreign and Egyptian judges, but with foreign judges making up the majority of the bench. Nubar Pasha, the creator of the Mixed Courts, was attempting to end European extraterritoriality and other privileges granted by the Ottoman capitulations, while at the same time not alienating foreign bond holders.

The plan was to eventually fold the Mixed Court's jurisdictions into a national court system, functionally abolishing extraterritoriality – although this would not come to pass. The Mixed Courts were able to bring civil and commercial issues involving foreigners under their jurisdiction, but criminal cases involving foreigners remained under the control of Consular Courts. These courts are the first example of judicial independence from the executive in Egypt, despite the foreign influence within. In addition to the Napoleonic Code, Egypt was also pressured by foreign powers to add an article which ensured that decisions made against the Egyptian government would be enforced, as well as a parquet system staffed by foreigners. Egypt would keep the concept of the parquet after independence.

British occupation caused Egyptians to fear that Europeans would gain control of the legal system if a centralized National Court system was not quickly established. This led Egypt to use the Napoleonic code-based law from the Mixed Courts with only minor modifications in the National Courts, scrapping a previously planned legal code which would have been based on Shari'a for the sake of time. While it was still planned that the Mixed Courts and National Courts would merge, this would end up taking until 1949, after Egyptian independence.

During British occupation, the independent Shari'a courts still operating in Egypt came under scrutiny but escaped abolition. Shari'a courts were allowed to hear cases regarding personal status, and during the later years of occupation were criticized for allowing forum shopping, undermining state authority.

After the First World War and the formalization of British rule, Britain planned a sweeping reform of Egyptian law involving the centralization of courts and the use of English as the language of law, yet the Revolution of 1919 prevented this. British influence would linger in Egypt until 1937, when the Montreux Conference finally established full Egyptian sovereignty, ending the Consular Courts and the capitulations which were still being enforced.

While the Mixed Courts were integrated into the National Courts after 1937, it would take until 1955 for independent Shari'a courts to be abolished. It was not only these independent Shari'a courts which were abolished, but other minority religious courts which had autonomy. Both of these legal entities were attacked on nationalistic grounds, with some likening the existence of courts not established by or beholden to the national government to the capitulations.

=== Egypt After 1952 ===
After the Egyptian Revolution of 1952 and Gamal Abdel Nasser's subsequent establishment of a one-party state, independence of the judiciary would come under attack in various ways. Several now-defunct exceptional courts were established, those being the Court of the Revolution and The People's Courts. These courts had no options for appeal and were typically staffed with military loyalists. Aside from the creation of new courts, the existing judiciary was stripped of its power to review administrative actions.

In 1969, Nasser continued to attack judicial independence in what was called "The Massacre of the Judiciary". This involved the dissolution of independent judicial organizations such as the Judges Club and the Lawyers Syndicate, as well as the firing of over 200 judges and the creation of the Supreme Council of Judicial Organizations, which allowed Nasser greater control over judicial careers.

When Anwar Sadat came to power, he reversed course on the attacks Nasser started. Internal autonomy for the judiciary was restored, and many new low to mid level appellate courts were established. Additionally, Sadat established the Supreme Constitutional Court in 1979. Sadat wanted to emphasize the rule of law and institutional independence, and his judicial reforms were done to this end.

Aside from a ruling over the governments ability to interfere in elections which led to a retaliatory shakeup of the Supreme Constitutional Court's composition, the judiciary would function without significant disruption until the 2011 Revolution and the subsequent 2013 Coup. Members of the Supreme Constitutional Court would be involved the drafting of the post-2011 constitution, and while tensions between the judiciary and the government would reach a fever pitch in the lead-up to the coup, the judiciary would enter the Sisi government relatively unchanged.

== Constitution ==
Egypt has had several constitutions, the current being established on January 18, 2014. The Egyptian constitution establishes a semi-presidential republic. Various protections for equality and freedom of belief are established, and Islam is declared the state religion. Various clauses relate to the transfer of power during the 2013 coup, such as the right of the military to pick its own secretary of defense for eight years, and the clause which states that laws passed under the previous administration are still legitimate.

Shari'a law is established as "the principal source of legislation". Initially, this read "a principal source of legislation", which caused outrage from the Islamist constituency who claimed that the language meant legislators did not need to actually conform to Shari'a. In 1980, the clause was amended to its current state, and the Supreme Constitutional Court ruled that only laws written after 1980 were able to be challenged on the basis that they did not conform to Islamic principles. Those who advocated for the change hoped that it would lead to the all laws which did not conform to the ulama's interpretation of Shari'a being declared unconstitutional. This did not come to pass, and the clause has instead come to mean laws cannot compel Muslims to go against their faith and must conform to general Islamic principals as laid out by thinkers such as Rashid Rida.

== Egyptian Civil Code ==
The Egyptian Civil Code is the primary source of civil law for Egypt, governing "the areas of personal rights, contracts, obligations, and torts.". The first version of Egyptian Civil Code was written in 1949 containing 1149 articles.

There are "two levels" of litigation (two trials of fact)" with another appellate level in civil litigation in Egypt.

- "Small claims cases are tried before a single judge, with a right to de novo appeal to a panel of three judges from the Court of First Instance."
- "Larger claims originate with a panel of three Court of First Instance judges, with a right of de novo appeal to a three-judge panel of Court of Appeals judges. Appeals from the Court of Appeals are limited to legal issues, and are conducted before the Court of Cassation, which is the highest court of Egypt's common court system." according to EgyptJustice.com.

Unlike Saudi Arabia and some other Muslim countries, the Egyptian legal system has no office of hisbah (Islamic religious police force), but it does allows for "hisbah" lawsuits.

== Judiciary of Egypt ==
The judicial system (or judicial branch) of Egypt is an independent branch of the Egyptian government which includes both secular and religious courts. The Judiciary of Egypt has a general legal system composed of District Courts, Primary Courts, Courts of Appeal, and the Court of Cassation, in order of supremacy. These courts hear most civil and criminal issues, with the Court of Cassation acting as a supreme court for matters within the general system's jurisdiction.

There are also several exceptional courts, such as Family Courts, the Supreme Constitutional Court, Economic Courts, and Administrative Courts. These courts hear only specific matters and were created in order to streamline the legal process. The Supreme Constitutional Court hears matters regarding the constitutionality of laws and regulations, and is not a general court of last resort. It also decides on negative and positive conflicts of jurisdiction.

Two special legal entities also exist, the Egyptian State Lawsuits Authority, and the Public Prosecutors. The Egyptian State Lawsuits Authority represents the Arab Republic of Egypt in all international courts and tribunals. It has the authority to plead on Egypt's behalf, and is involved in cases regarding State owned entities. The Public Prosecutor system is based on the French Parquet system, and Public Prosecutors are responsible for taking part in both the investigation and prosecution of crimes.

The criminal code listed three main categories of crime: contraventions (minor offenses), misdemeanors (offenses punishable by imprisonment or fines), and felonies (offenses punishable by penal servitude or death).

== See also ==
- Cairo Declaration on Human Rights in Islam
- Application of sharia law by country
- Abortion under Egyptian law
- Egyptian Judges' Club
- Egyptian nationality law
- Egyptian NGO Law

== Bibliography ==
- Bechor, Guy. The Sanhuri Code, and the Emergence of Modern Arab Civil Law (1932 To 1949), (2007), ISBN 9789004158788.
- Hoyle, Mark, The Mixed Courts of Egypt, (1991), ISBN 1-85333-321-2.
