= 2023–2024 Egyptian financial crisis =

Egyptian economic event

The 2023–2024 Egyptian financial crisis was an economic crisis that hit Egypt beginning in 2023 that led to the Egyptian government and the Central Bank of Egypt devaluing the Egyptian pound. Due to a continued shortage of foreign exchange in the face of increasing external public debt service payments and the absence of measures to boost foreign exchange reserves, the country's debt capacity significantly declined during the crisis.

The crisis was largely resolved in 2024 through a combination of large-scale foreign investment, multilateral aid, and sweeping economic reforms. A $35 billion deal with the United Arab Emirates to develop the Ras el-Hekma coastal region, along with $22 billion in support from the International Monetary Fund, European Union, and World Bank, provided critical foreign currency inflows that averted a debt default and stabilized the economy. In exchange, Egypt implemented a free-floating exchange rate, tightened fiscal policy, and renewed its stalled privatization program, aiming to reduce state dominance and attract sustainable foreign direct investment.

== Causes ==
=== Trade balance deficit ===
Egypt's average import bill from abroad is estimated at US$90 billion, compared to total exports (commodities and petroleum) of about US$52 billion, including US$35 billion in commodity exports, with an average deficit of $38 billion in the trade balance, excluding debt installments and interest.

Egypt's balance of trade took a fluctuating path from 2014 to 2023, recording a peak trade deficit in 2014–2015 at US$39.1 billion due to the decline in proceeds from commodity exports. This decline resulted from a decrease in petroleum export proceeds caused by the decline in global oil prices. Egypt's trade balance began to improve again in the following years thanks to the efforts and policies of the Egyptian government focused on supporting exports and encouraging the production and sale of Egyptian-made products. The government also instituted policies to absorb the negative impact of the inflation of the Egyptian pound in November 2016, with the trade deficit recording a peak value at US$38 billion in 2018-2019 due to ongoing rises in oil prices. The trade deficit returned to record high values for a third time in 2020-2021 and 2021–2022 at US$42.1 billion and US$43.4 billion respectively. These values were affected by the closure of global economic systems due to the COVID-19 pandemic and its negative repercussions. Improvements in the nation's trade balance appeared afterwards to approach where it had been in 2011–2012, recording US$31.2 billion in 2022–2023.

On October 4, 2023, the Central Bank of Egypt confirmed that Egypt's trade deficit had improved significantly during the fiscal year 2022–2023, declining by 28.2% to $31.2 billion. The Central Bank explained that Egypt's non-oil trade deficit had improved by 34% during the past year ending in June, declining to US$31.6 billion, compared to US$47.8 billion in the previous fiscal year, supported by a decrease in payments for non-oil commodity imports by about US$16.4 billion.

=== External debt crises ===
In 2022, Egypt recorded a government debt-to-GDP ratio of 87.2% of the country's GDP. Egypt's government debt-to-GDP ratio reached an all-time high of 103% of GDP in 2017, and a record low of 73.3% of GDP in 2009. Egypt's debt service from debt installments and interest amounted to about US$42.3 billion during 2024, its highest bill ever required to be paid in a single year, after external debt jumped to about US$165 billion and cash reserves did not exceed US$35.2 billion.

During the period from 2014 to 2024, Egypt's total external debt doubled. The total external debt amounted to about US$165.4 billion by the end of the first quarter of 2023. The Central Bank of Egypt revealed that the value of Egypt's external debts due for repayment was equal to about US$29.229 billion during 2024.

=== Infrastructure projects ===
Many economists believed that the government had spent too much borrowed money on infrastructure projects that would not quickly generate the amount of foreign currency it needs. These megaprojects, such as the Suez Canal Area Development Project, had a positive impact on raising national economic growth and employment rates after its economic slowdown between 2011 and 2015, which in turn led to higher investment rates. However, these sectors did not directly contribute to increasing exports or reducing imports, which was reflected in the continued trade deficit present in 2024 that had not significantly changed for the better since the adoption of its International Monetary Fund program in late 2016.

The years from 2017 to 2020 witnessed a boom in the growth of loans from multinational institutions, driven by many infrastructure projects adopted by these donors. Many of the infrastructure projects launched in recent years aimed to create a new High-speed rail network that is more costly for passengers than the current rail network, leading to its prices being much less affordable for lower-income groups. These projects have sparked societal debate about the necessity of the expansion of Egypt's rail system, and the pressure it contributes to national external debt. The financing of these projects are priced with interest based on the Euro interbank rate, which witnessed a sharp decline during the period of 2014–2022 before rising sharply, affected by the rise in US interest.

=== Military economy ===
Military-owned companies are exempt from taxes in Egypt, as the Egyptian law stipulates that the Egyptian Armed Forces do not pay value-added tax on goods, equipment, machinery, services, and raw materials needed for armaments, defense, and national security purposes. According to a statement issued by Egyptian President Abdel Fattah el-Sisi in 2016, the military represents between 1.5 and 2 percent of the Egyptian economy (US$2.39 billion to US$4.46 billion). Egypt's growing military footprint and its control over economic policy are considered by analysts to be a hallmark of the Sisi government and one of the roots of its current debt crisis. One of the main conditions of the US$3 billion IMF loan he received in 2016 was to reform the administrative structure of military entities, end their tax exemptions, and provide a level playing field for the private sector.

On November 21, 2021, Egyptian billionaire Naguib Sawiris warned that government intervention in the private sector would create unfair competition between private companies and those owned by the state or the military. Sawiris said that the state should act as a regulator and not an owner of economic activity, adding that “companies owned by the government or the military do not pay taxes.”

== Government response ==
=== Public asset sale ===
On November 12, 2023, the Egyptian Prime Minister announced that Egypt aims to offer 32 companies as part of a government program offering public assets for sale. He said that the International Finance Corporation had been contracted as a strategic advisor for the offering program, which includes preparing 50 government companies for offering. Egypt aimed to increase the private sector's contribution to 65% of the total investments implemented over the next three years. On January 10, 2024, the government identified about 61 new government companies, including a number of banks, that the government will offer either for sale to strategic investors or by offering shares in them on the Egyptian Stock Exchange with the aim of activating the state ownership document and providing dollar liquidity in light of Egypt's currency crisis. On February 13, 2024, the Egyptian Minister of Finance said that his country was targeting revenues of up to US$6.5 billion from the government offering program by the end of 2024.

=== Rationalization of government spending ===
On January 31, 2024, the Egyptian Cabinet decided to reduce the public treasury's financing in the investment plan for the fiscal year 2023–2024 by 15% of the targeted allotments for agencies within the state's general budget. The Cabinet also said that no new projects would be initiated in this fiscal year, but priority would be given to projects that were 70% or more complete and to focus on the nation's necessary and urgent investment needs, in light of the commitment to the directives related to rationalizing spending, reducing the external debt ceiling, and encouraging local production and national industry.

=== Social Protection Package ===
On February 7, 2024, President Abdel Fattah El-Sisi directed the activation of a social protection package, which included working to raise the minimum wage by 50% to reach 6,000 Egyptian pounds per month, and increasing the wages of state employees and economic entities, with a minimum ranging between 1,000 and 1,200 pounds per month according to the job grade. The package also included the allocation of fifteen billion Egyptian pounds in additional increases for doctors, nurses, teachers, and university faculty members, and allocating six billion pounds to appoint 120,000 members of medical professions, teachers, and workers in other administrative bodies. The social package included approving a 15% increase in pensions for thirteen million citizens at a total cost of EGP 74 billion, and a 15% increase in “Takaful and Karama” pensions at a cost of EGP 5.5 billion so that the annual increase becomes 55% of the value of the pension, with EGP 41 billion being allocated to Takaful and Karama pensions in the fiscal year 2024–2025. The social package includes raising the tax exemption limit for all state employees in the government, public and private sectors by 33%, from EGP 45,000 to EGP 60,000, at a total annual cost of EGP 5 billion.

=== Ras El Hikma deal ===
On February 24, 2024, Egypt signed a contract to develop the Ras El-Hikma project in partnership with the United Arab Emirates, with the project intending to attract investments worth more than US$150 billion during the project's development period, including US$35 billion in foreign direct investment for the Egyptian state within two months. Fitch Ratings said that Egypt's US$35 billion deal with the UAE to develop Ras El-Hikma would ease external liquidity pressures and facilitate exchange rate adjustment.

=== Highest interest rate hike ===
On March 6, 2024, in an extraordinary meeting of the Monetary Policy Committee, the Central Bank of Egypt decided to raise interest rates by 600 basis points, bringing the overnight deposit, lending and main operation rates to 27.25%, 28.25%, and 27.75% respectively. It also raised the credit and discount rates by the same percentage to 27.75%, the highest increase in the nation's history of interest rate hike decisions.

=== Full liberalization of the exchange rate ===
On March 6, 2024, the Central Bank of Egypt decided to reduce the exchange rate of the Egyptian pound against the US dollar for the first time in more than 14 months, following an exceptional meeting that raised interest rates by about 600 basis points. The Central Bank confirmed in a statement that, within the framework of targeting inflation rates, it would work to allow the exchange rate to be determined according to market mechanisms.

== Effects ==
=== Budget deficit ===
The International Monetary Fund expects Egypt's budget deficit to rise to 10.7% of GDP during the current fiscal year from 6.4% in the last fiscal year. This would be the largest budget deficit as a percentage of GDP in Egypt since the 2015-2016 fiscal year. The primary surplus is expected to narrow to 1.5% of GDP in the 2023/24 fiscal year, down from 2.3% last year.

=== Price inflation ===
According to the World Bank, Egypt ranked first among the countries most affected by food price inflation at the end of 2023, and witnessed successive increases in general inflation indicators, especially in food prices, due to the successive devaluation of the Egyptian pound against the dollar since 2016 and the increase in the food import bill. On August 10, 2023, the annual inflation rate in Egypt continued to rise, registering a record level of 36.5% in July 2023. This increase was driven by a 68.2% increase in the prices of food and beverages. Inflation came as a result of the continuation of the same factors that caused the increase in the prices of goods and services locally during the past months, most notably the rise in the prices of strategic goods globally, the decline in the exchange rate of the Egyptian pound against the dollar, and the reduction of imports.

=== Credit rating downgrade ===
The three credit rating agencies that monitor Egypt's sovereign debt have all downgraded their ratings during the crisis, and their outlook for future rating changes became negative. On October 21, 2023, S&P Global Ratings downgraded Egypt's foreign and local currency sovereign rating to “B-” from “B” with a stable outlook. S&P said the downgrade reflected repeated delays in implementing monetary and structural reforms in the country, among other factors. On November 4, 2023, Fitch Ratings downgraded Egypt's long-term foreign currency credit rating to “B-” from “B”, citing increased risks to external financing and a rise in government debt. On January 19, 2024, Moody's Ratings changed the outlook on Egypt's sovereign debt rating to negative from stable. The agency maintained Egypt's credit rating at caa1.

=== Drug crisis ===
Egypt's drug availability crisis has been exacerbated by its financial crisis, which has forced factories to operate at 60% of their production capacity due to shortages of imported raw materials. Some citizens resorted to buying large quantities of drugs that are no longer available in their typically marketed forms, which caused drugs that have begun to appear to disappear again within a short period.

== See also ==
- 1998 Russian financial crisis
- 2008–2014 Spanish financial crisis
- 2008 Latvian financial crisis
- 2008–2011 Icelandic financial crisis
