= Agreement Between Great Britain and Greece Relating to the Suppression of the Capitulations in Egypt (1920) =

1920 treaty between the United Kingdom and Greece

An agreement concluded between the British and Greek governments in Athens on 22 August (Gregorian style)/4 September 1920, in order to regulate legal relations between Greek citizens and the court system in Egypt. Ratifications were exchanged in Athens on 4 January 1921 and the agreement went into effect. It was registered in the League of Nations Treaty Series on 26 February 1921.

== Background ==
The Capitulations system was introduced into the legal system of the Ottoman Empire and some other Middle Eastern countries as a result of western pressure. This system provided that in case a foreign citizen was charged with a crime, he or she shall not be tried by the local legal system, but be tried by a special court to consist of foreign judges, in accordance with his country laws.

The Capitulations system also prevailed in Egypt, which was under actual British rule from 1882 onward. Following the First World War, pressure was mounting on the British authorities in Egypt to grant greater freedom of action to the Egyptian government in matters of control over its own legal system. As a result, the British government agreed to modify some legal arrangements.

== Terms of the agreement ==
Article 1 stipulated for the renunciation by the Greek government of its privileges under the Capitulations system. Article 2 provided for the termination of all Greek consular courts, except for those dealing with current cases. Article 3 stipulated that Greek citizens in Egypt will still enjoy special legal status in Egypt, but under British law instead of Greek law. Article 4 stipulated that Greek consular officials shall retain their diplomatic privileges as before. Article 5 determined which Anglo-Greek treaties shall remain valid under the new arrangements. Article 6 dealt with procedures for the operation of Greek associations in Egypt.

== See also ==
- Agreement between Great Britain and Norway Relating to the Suppression of the Capitulations in Egypt (1921)
- Agreement between Great Britain and Sweden Relating to the Suppression of the Capitulations in Egypt (1921)
- Agreement between Great Britain and Denmark Relating to the Suppression of the Capitulations in Egypt (1921)
- Montreux Convention Regarding the Abolition of the Capitulations in Egypt
