= Agreement Between Great Britain and Norway Relating to the Suppression of the Capitulations in Egypt =

1921 treaty between the United Kingdom and Norway

An agreement was concluded between the British and Norwegian governments in Christiania (now Oslo) on April 22, 1921, in order to regulate legal relations between Norwegian citizens and the court system in Egypt. Ratifications were not exchanged for this agreement, since the issue was not mentioned in it, and the agreement went into effect. It was registered in the League of Nations Treaty Series on May 28, 1921.

== Background ==
The Capitulations system has been introduced into the legal system of the Ottoman Empire and some other Middle Eastern countries as a result of western pressure. This system provided that in case a foreign citizen was charged with a crime, he or she shall not be tried by the local legal system, but be tried by a special court consisting of foreign judges, in accordance with his country laws.

The Capitulations system also prevailed in Egypt, which was under actual British rule from 1882 onward. Following the First World War, pressure was mounting on the British authorities in Egypt to grant greater freedom of action to the Egyptian government in matters of control over its own legal system. As a result, the British government agreed to modify some legal arrangements.

== Terms of the agreement ==
In article 1, the Norwegian government renounced all privileges to its citizens in Egypt in exchange for their protection under the British system. Article 2 stipulated for the abolition of Norwegian consular courts throughout Egypt. Article 3 stipulated that Norwegian citizens in Egypt shall enjoy the same privileges as British citizens. Article 4 stipulated that Norwegian consular agents shall retain their diplomatic privileges as before. Article 5 determined which Anglo-Norwegian treaties shall remain valid under the new arrangements.

== See also ==
- Agreement between Great Britain and Greece Relating to the Suppression of the Capitulations in Egypt (1920)
- Agreement between Great Britain and Sweden Relating to the Suppression of the Capitulations in Egypt (1921)
- Agreement between Great Britain and Denmark Relating to the Suppression of the Capitulations in Egypt (1921)
- Montreux Convention Regarding the Abolition of the Capitulations in Egypt
