= Abortion under Egyptian law =

Abortion

Egyptian Penal Law
- Long title: Abortion under Egyptian law Egypt
- Bill citation: Articles: 260, 261, 262, 263
- Status: Current legislation

In accordance with Egyptian law, abortion is considered a criminal act that violates the right to life, as it is often intended to terminate the fetus' right to future life. The Egyptian legislature has dedicated a separate chapter in the Penal Code, Title III, titled "Abortion of Pregnant Women and the Manufacture and Sale of Adulterated Drinks Harmful to Health." Egyptian law does not explicitly define abortion. Instead, it outlines the various forms of abortion and the corresponding penalties. The Egyptian Court of Cassation defines it as "deliberately terminating a pregnancy prematurely."

Abortion is prevalent, but rarely prosecuted in Egypt. This is because abortion relies on the element of concealment and is not reported, rather, it is discovered by chance, particularly if the abortion results in the death of the pregnant woman. Even if they are identified, it is challenging to provide concrete evidence to substantiate their existence. The absence of convictions may also be attributed to the judge's comprehension of the social and economic circumstances that may prompt some mothers to seek abortion as a solution. This prompts the judge to attempt to identify reasons for innocence or even a lack of responsibility.

In Egyptian law, abortion is considered a material rather than a formal offense, as the resulting harm is inflicted on a living organism, even if it is a fetus that has not yet emerged into life. Nevertheless, if a fetus that has already separated from the uterus and is on its way out is killed, the act is regarded as murder rather than abortion. The essential element of the crime is the termination of a fetus within the uterus, or the removal of a fetus from the uterus prior to the natural time of birth. Egyptian law does not impose penalties for attempted abortion. However, complicity in abortion is possible through methods of agreement, incitement, or assistance that do not involve the pregnant woman's body. In such cases, the perpetrator would be considered a principal rather than a mere accomplice.

In 1998, Muhammad Sayyid Tantawy, the Grand Imam of al-Azhar, issued a fatwa calling for access to abortion for unmarried women who had been raped. In 2004, he approved a draft bill that would permit abortion in the case of rape; the bill was unsuccessful.

Due to these legal restrictions, unsafe abortions in Egypt are common; carried out by indigenous methods, at clandestine clinics, or by private gynecologists. One study found that about 20% of obstetric hospital admissions were for post-abortion treatment. Another study estimated that between 1995 and 2000, there were 2,542 maternal deaths in the country due to unsafe abortions. Consequently, prevalence is hard to assess. In a 2000 study of 1,025 women from six villages in Upper Egypt, approximately 40% were found to have had at least one abortion; among this group, there were 265 abortions per 1000 live births.

== Components ==
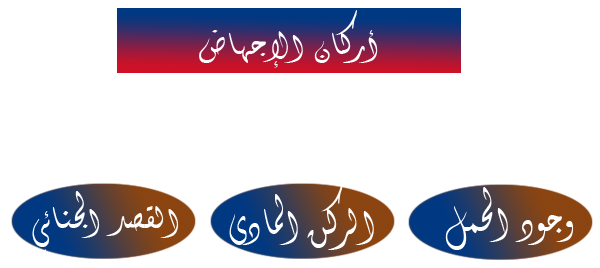
components of abortion.

The occurrence of an abortion necessitates the existence of a fetus whose right to future life has been infringed. This is because the fetus is entitled to undergo normal development within the womb until its natural date of birth. In addition to the condition of pregnancy, the crime of abortion can only be committed if there is both a material and a moral element present.

=== Presumed component: Presence of pregnancy ===
The presumed perpetrator of this criminal activity is a female individual, who is presumed to be pregnant. The violation in question is that of the fetus's right to live its life. Consequently, a fetus in a woman's womb is presumed to be subject to the act of abortion, either by removing it from the womb before its due date, which often results in its death, or by killing it in the womb, which requires it to be removed in order to save the pregnant woman's life. However, the victim of the crime is not the woman herself, but rather her unborn child. Consequently, abortion is included in the category of crimes that violate the right to life. In the law it is considered that this pregnancy is not a human being because it has not yet seen life. Judicial discourse frames abortion cases in technical legal terms, favoring secular arguments, with moral or religious arguments being less frequently cited; it does not equate abortion with other crimes, framing it separately from other crimes, while still legally condemning it.

The legal definition of pregnancy is the fertilization of an ovum by a spermatozoon. This marks the commencement of the embryo's life, which concludes with the birth process. Accordingly, the temporal scope of the criminal act of abortion is delineated by the interval between fertilization and the commencement of the birthing process. The termination of pregnancy prior to the occurrence of fertilization is not considered an abortion, (Note: The use of contraceptive methods, regardless of their form or effect, is not considered an abortion.) nor is the termination of pregnancy subsequent to the onset of childbirth. Rather, the sphere of attack on human life or bodily integrity commences at the onset of childbirth. The legal protection of the fetus' right to life begins at the moment of fertilisation until the moment of birth, and does not require a specific period of time following fertilisation. Accordingly, Egyptian law defines the removal of the fetus from the uterus by artificial means prior to the normal time of birth, even in the earliest stages of pregnancy, as a fetal abortion. The Egyptian Court of Cassation has ruled that terminating a pregnancy before the fourth month of gestation is not permitted under Islamic law. Furthermore, Article 60 of the Egyptian Penal Code permits actions that are permitted by Islamic law, stating that the Sharia's position on this matter is not a firmly established principle based on evidence, but rather an interpretation by jurists that has generated differing opinions among them.

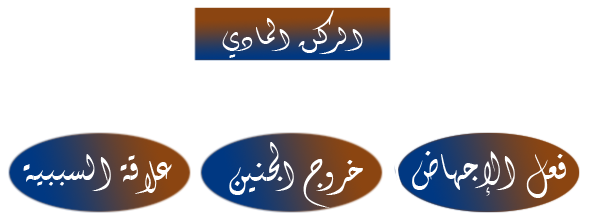
components of the physical element of abortion.

If the offense is based on the presumption that a pregnancy exists at the moment the act of abortion is committed, then the act is not considered criminal if the pregnant woman is not in fact pregnant. The perpetrator must have believed that they were acting on a pregnant woman and intended to terminate her pregnancy. Article 264 of the Penal Code explicitly states that attempted abortion is not punishable. This is because the absence of pregnancy is an absolute or legal impossibility that prevents the attempted crime from materializing.

==== Physical component ====
The components of the physical element of abortion are threefold: The act of abortion, the result of the abortion (the fetus leaving the womb), and the causation between the act and the result of the abortion are the elements of the physical element of abortion.

==== The act of abortion ====
It can be defined as the deliberate removal of the fetus from the uterus before the normal gestation period has elapsed. The legislation in question encompasses a number of methods of abortion, including, but not limited to, physical violence and the use of pharmaceuticals or other techniques that result in the termination of pregnancy. The distinction between a legally punishable abortion, a miscarriage resulting from a specific medical condition, physical weakness or exertional stress, and a spontaneous birth in which the fetus is expelled naturally without the intervention of external forces, hinges on the method utilized to facilitate this process.

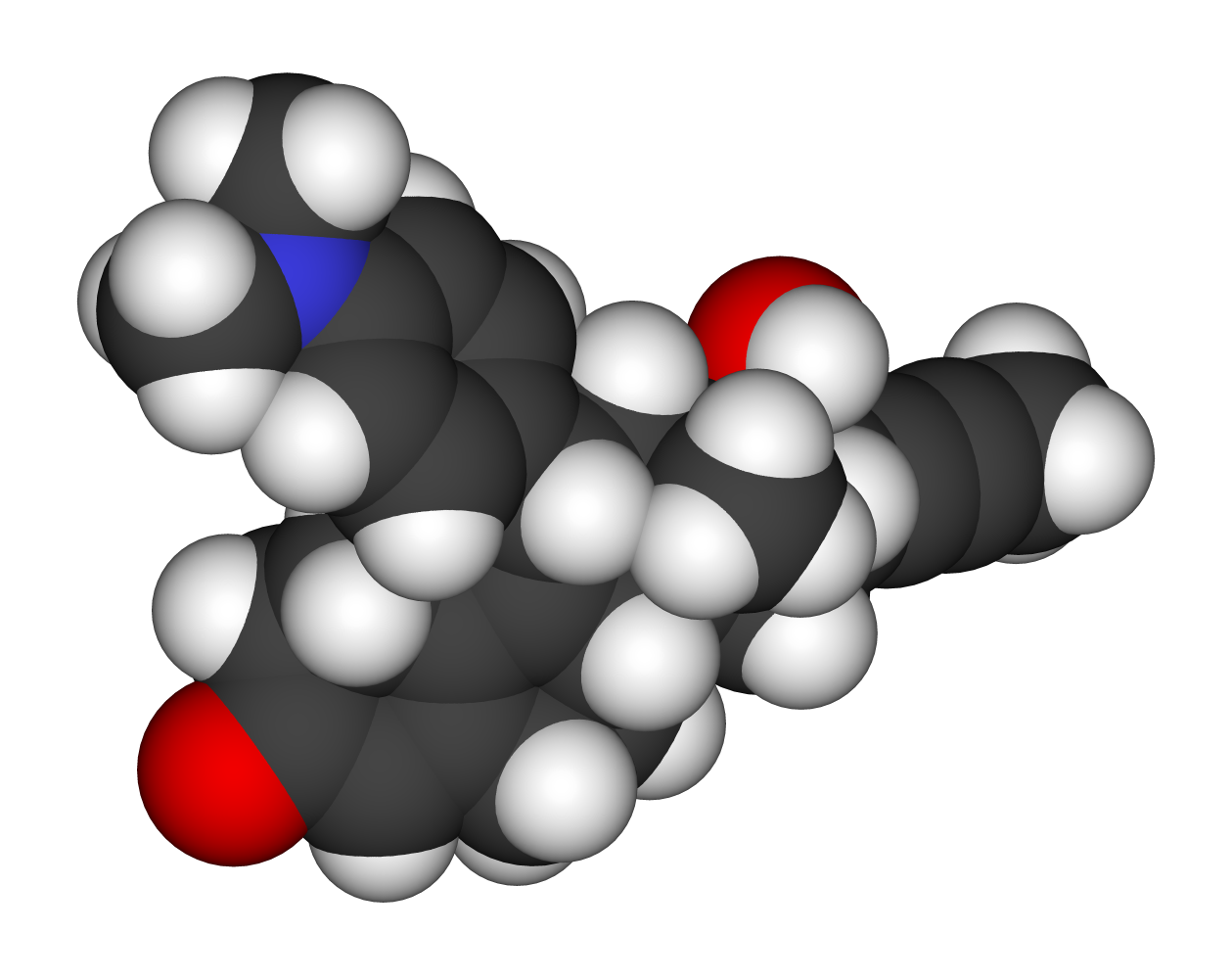
Mifepristone, is a chemical abortion method.

==== Methods of abortion ====
- Medical means, such as surgery, or non-medical means, such as the use of violence, beating, or other means of physical abuse.
- Chemical agents that cause uterine muscle contractions, resulting in the removal of the fetus or the killing of the fetus inside the uterus in preparation for removal.
- Mechanical means is the utilization of a machine or tool to dislodge or eliminate the fetus from the uterus.
- Some methods appear innocuous but in fact serve to conceal their true purpose. This is the case with massaging the pregnant woman's body, engaging in violent sports such as jumping, dancing, or horseback riding, or wearing tight clothes that exert pressure on the body and may result in an abortion.
- Means of psychological or moral abuse that lead to induced abortions, provided that the intention of their use is to cause an abortion. (Note: Article 261 of the Egyptian Penal Code penalizes the abortion of a pregnant woman by using means conducive to this, without specifying the means or their form. This is consistent with some Muslim jurists who have ruled that anyone who insults a woman in a way that causes her to miscarry is liable for the woman's abortion.)
- The pregnant woman's refusal to take action to prevent others from performing an abortion on her body. In legal terminology, this is referred to as: "She facilitated the utilization of such methods on her own body."

==== Premature labor ====
Suction abortion at 8 weeks gestational age (6 weeks after fertilization). 1:Uterus 2:Fetus 3:Endometrium 4:Laparoscope 5:Medical scoop 6:Suction pump connector.

The premature exit of the fetus from the womb is a criminalized act under the law. The crime of abortion is committed regardless of whether the fetus is born alive or dead. In the latter case, the fetus is not viable, which is necessary for the crime to be realized. The act of attempted abortion is not a criminal offense under the law. Nevertheless, if the pregnancy is terminated in the mother through abortion and the fetus survives, the crime of abortion is not committed; rather, the act is regarded as a premature induction of labor.

If the means used to terminate the pregnancy result in the death of the pregnant woman while the pregnancy remains in her womb, the crime of abortion is not committed. Rather, the crime of beating, wounding, or administering harmful substances leading to death is committed. (Note: The Egyptian Court of Cassation did not concur with this interpretation, however, and determined that the crime of abortion had been committed in this hypothetical scenario. The court ruled that the elements of the crime were fulfilled even if the pregnancy remained in the uterus of the pregnant woman due to her death, and that the term "miscarriage" used in the law did not indicate that the exit of the pregnancy from the uterus was an element of the crime in this case.) In the event that the fetus is expelled and the mother subsequently dies, the offenses of abortion and assault, including wounding or the administration of harmful substances, are deemed to have been committed. In such a case, the more severe of the two offenses shall be the basis for the imposition of the penalty.

==== Causality ====
There must be a causal relationship between the use of any abortion method and the fetus leaving the womb dead or non-viable before its normal due date. In other words, the method used to terminate the pregnancy must be the cause of the death of the fetus; the abortion must not be due to a natural cause other than the method. In the absence of a complete understanding of the material component of the crime of abortion, it is not possible to establish the crime.

If the abortion is the result of an act that was not intended by the perpetrator to cause the abortion, this is merely an attempt to commit a crime that is not punishable under Egyptian law. The trial judge is afforded the discretion to determine, in accordance with the general rules, whether there is a causal relationship between the defendant's activity and the criminal outcome.

=== Moral component: Criminal intent ===
Abortion in all its forms is considered to be a deliberate crime. The moral component of this act is the perpetrator's criminal intent, which is directed towards the physical act that constitutes the crime as defined by the law. Accordingly, any unintentional error that results in the removal of the fetus before its due date, even if this error is serious, is not considered an abortion. This is because there is no criminal intent on the part of the person accused of abortion, and his liability is limited to unintentional injury only. The mens rea for the crime of abortion requires that the accused was aware, at the time of the act, of the existence of the pregnancy. If a perpetrator commits an assault upon a woman unaware that she is pregnant, and the assault causes the woman to miscarry, it may be argued that the perpetrator did not possess the requisite criminal intent. For instance, a scenario may be posited in which an individual strikes a pregnant woman unaware of her condition and, as a consequence of this attack, the pregnant woman miscarries. (Note: The defendant is held liable for the offense of battery, despite the fact that he is not responsible for the abortion.)

It is presumed that the accused is aware of the potential risks associated with his actions and the possibility of harm to the fetus. Therefore, if the accused lacks such awareness, it can be inferred that he did not possess the requisite criminal intent. To illustrate, a person who persuades a woman, aware that she is pregnant, to engage in high-risk sports without informing her of the potential risks to her pregnancy will not be held legally responsible for the subsequent abortion. (Note: Nevertheless, the defendant may be held liable for manslaughter if the abortion results in any form of harm to the woman, and the defendant is determined to be at fault.) In addition, the defendant must intend to remove the fetus from the womb before the normal time of birth, which is the result that is criminalized by law in abortion. Accordingly, a man who strikes his spouse while aware that she is pregnant but without the intention of terminating the pregnancy has no criminal intent. The absence of criminal intent is also evident in cases where an individual pushes a pregnant woman, causing her to fall from a high place to the ground, resulting in a miscarriage. In such instances, the incidents are considered an ordinary beating, rather than an act with the specific intent to cause an abortion.

In accordance with the general tenet of Egyptian law, which holds that the motive for committing a crime is irrelevant if the requisite criminal intent is present, the motives for procuring an abortion are immaterial if the requisite criminal intent is established. In other words, the type of motive for the abortion does not affect the penalty. This is regardless of whether the abortion is motivated by revenge, or by the protection of honor and consideration. This could be the case if the pregnancy is the result of an illicit sexual relationship, such as adultery or rape. The motive for the abortion may also be the desire to relieve the economic burden that a pregnancy places on a family that is unable to bear it. Another reason may be the fear of giving birth to a deformed or seriously ill child. Additionally, the abortion may be sought due to the mother being overworked in circumstances that are not in accordance with the law. (Note: These cases represent instances of medical abortion, wherein the termination of pregnancy is a therapeutic act carried out by a specialized physician. They are subject to the same conditions as the permissibility of medical acts in Egypt.)

== The penalty ==
Legality of abortion by country or territory Legal on request: No gestational limit; Gestational limit after the first 17 weeks; Gestational limit in the first 17 weeks; Unclear gestational limit; Legally restricted to cases of: Risk to woman's life, to her health*, rape*, fetal impairment*, or socioeconomic factors; Risk to woman's life, to her health*, rape, or fetal impairment; Risk to woman's life, to her health*, or fetal impairment; Risk to woman's life*, to her health*, or rape; Risk to woman's life or to her health; Risk to woman's life; Illegal with no exceptions; No information; * Does not apply to some countries or territories in that category Note: In some countries or territories, abortion laws are modified by other laws, regulations, legal principles or judicial decisions. This map shows their combined effect as implemented by the authorities.

Abortion is classified as a misdemeanor, which carries a potential sentence of imprisonment. However, it can also be classified as a felony.

=== As a misdemeanor ===
Articles 261 and 262 of the Egyptian Penal Code define abortion as a misdemeanor. (Note: In Egyptian law, a misdemeanor is defined as an offense punishable by imprisonment for a period not exceeding three years and a fine.)

==== According to Article 261 ====
"Any individual who intentionally induces a miscarriage in a pregnant woman by administering medication, utilizing methods that result in this outcome, or persuading her to engage in such actions, regardless of her consent, shall be subject to incarceration."

The aforementioned text is predicated on the assumption that the aforementioned components of abortion are present and that the accused is not the pregnant woman whose pregnancy was terminated. This could be a man or a woman. However, the individual in question must not be a doctor, surgeon, pharmacist, or midwife, as this would result in the abortion being classified as a felony rather than a misdemeanor. Article 261 of the Penal Code addresses the administration of drugs or the use of abortion-inducing methods that do not involve violence. According to the Article, abortion through violence is a felony, not a misdemeanor.

The Egyptian legislature deems any individual who provides guidance to a pregnant woman regarding the means of abortion to be a perpetrator, as outlined in the text, and not merely an accomplice. This ruling represents a departure from the general rules of Egyptian law regarding the distinction between perpetrator and accomplice. It establishes that anyone who guides a pregnant woman to the means of abortion will be punished for the crime of abortion, even if the pregnant woman does not ultimately use that means to have an abortion. A pregnant woman who utilizes the method instructed by the defendant is not considered an accomplice to the crime. Rather, she is considered an actor in the crime of abortion itself, as stipulated in Article 262 of the Egyptian Penal Code.

Article 261 of the Penal Code stipulates that the crime of abortion can only be committed if the pregnant woman has consented to the act of abortion, or if she has not consented and the abortion is performed without her knowledge. The pregnant woman's consent to the abortion is not a reason to allow it.

==== According to Article 262 ====
"A woman who knowingly consents to the use of drugs, or consents to the use of the aforementioned means, or enables others to use such means on her, and the abortion actually results from this, shall be subject to the aforementioned penalty."

In order for this offense to exist, the legislature requires the components of abortion as described in Article 260 of the Penal Code. This stipulation delineates the penalties that shall be imposed upon a pregnant woman who consents to the ingestion of drugs or to the utilization of abortion methods in the event that the abortion in question actually proceeds. It is evident that the article also encompasses the scenario in which a woman terminates her pregnancy without external influence or guidance. The suggestion that the punishment of a woman who aborts herself or uses the means to do so should be contingent on the condition that the means are offered and accepted by others, as implied by the apparent text of the article, would result in the exemption of women from punishment for abortion if they commit it spontaneously without any guidance, and the imposition of punishment for aborting themselves only in the case where others guide them to the means of abortion. The result in question could not have been an intended consequence of the legislative process, given that it is manifestly unreasonable.

The method of abortion utilized by the woman is irrelevant; the crime remains a misdemeanor for her, even if she aborted herself through violence. The circumstances of violence do not increase the punishment for abortion unless the abortion provider is other than the pregnant woman herself. According to Article 260 of the Penal Code, any individual who performs an abortion on a pregnant woman with her consent is guilty of a felony, not a misdemeanor. This implies that the reference to the aforementioned means in Article 262 is applicable to both violent and non-violent means if the woman uses them on herself.

The Egyptian legislature prescribes imprisonment for those convicted of abortion-related misdemeanors, with the length of the sentence falling between two specified limits. However, the judge is afforded considerable discretion in determining the precise length of the sentence, which may be set within the aforementioned limits. The act of attempting to commit this offense is not explicitly punishable.

=== As a felony ===
Abortion is considered a felony (Note: A felony in Egyptian law: Any crime punishable by death, life imprisonment, rigorous imprisonment, or ordinary imprisonment.) if any of the aggravating circumstances set forth in Articles 260 and 263 of the Egyptian Penal Code are met. Abortion felonies are punishable by rigorous imprisonment between the two general limits, the alteration of one of the two conditions results in a modification of the criminal act, thereby classifying it as a felony. Nevertheless, the attempted commission of this felony remains unpunished, as Article 264 of the Egyptian Penal Code stipulates that attempted abortion is not a punishable offense, regardless of whether it is classified as a misdemeanor or a felony.

==== Severity by method of abortion ====
"Any individual who deliberately causes the miscarriage of a pregnant woman through the infliction of physical harm or other forms of violence shall be subject to severe penalties, including prolonged incarceration."

This article is predicated on the assumption that the elements of an abortion are present and that it is committed by violent means. In the context of Egyptian legislation, this is the sole instance in which the method of abortion is explicitly acknowledged, and the potential risks to the pregnant woman's physical wellbeing are duly considered. This article also assumes that the perpetrator of abortion is someone other than the pregnant woman who aborted her pregnancy, regardless of whether or not the pregnant woman consented to the use of violence to terminate her pregnancy. This is because, if the law requires, in order to increase the punishment of the accused, that the violence used was without the woman's consent, it would effectively render abortion by harm permissible if it was done with the pregnant woman's consent, which is a position that has not been advocated. This implies that the occurrence of violence intensifies the penalty imposed on a defendant who assaults a pregnant woman through physical violence or other forms of abuse, regardless of whether the pregnant woman has consented. For example, a husband may force his pregnant wife to jump from a high place with the intention of aborting her pregnancy. Acts of violence may be perpetrated by an individual lacking criminal responsibility at the instigation of the perpetrator himself. For example, a husband may incite his young son to strike his pregnant wife with a large stick on her abdomen with the intention of aborting her pregnancy, thereby achieving the desired result.

==== Aggravation by offender status ====
"Should the individual responsible for the termination of pregnancy be a medical doctor, surgeon, pharmacist, or midwife, they shall be sentenced to rigorous imprisonment."

This supposition is contingent upon the presence of the elements constituting abortion and the absence of the pregnant woman who miscarried. In the event that a pregnant woman miscarries and she is among the professions enumerated in the text, her punishment is not augmented; rather, abortion for her is regarded as a misdemeanor in accordance with Article 262 of the Egyptian Penal Code, which establishes that abortion is a misdemeanor.

The rationale behind the more severe penalties for individuals who exhibit one or more of the characteristics outlined in the text is that they are more likely to resort to abortion due to their technical proficiency and access to resources and medications that facilitate the procedure without leaving a clear paper trail. Furthermore, the defendant exploits his position and technical expertise for the ostensible purpose of advancing societal interests, rather than promoting and facilitating access to abortion. A woman is more likely to decline an abortion if she believes in its consequences. Conversely, if the abortion provider is a medical professional, she may be more inclined to pursue the procedure due to the perceived insurance against the risks of the abortion process and the potential consequences, including the death of the woman.

The legislation does not stipulate that the attending physician or other medical professionals must have prior experience performing abortions. However, the penalties are enhanced for those who have not previously undergone the procedure. Furthermore, the legislation does not mandate remuneration for the procedure. Thus, an abortion may be performed as a courtesy, in which case the aggravating circumstance applies to a physician who performs a miscarriage on his spouse or child without receiving compensation. The article enumerates the following medical professionals to whom the aforementioned emphasis is applicable, with the proviso that: The aforementioned professionals include doctors, surgeons, pharmacists, and midwives. It is therefore not permissible to draw an analogy with them. The defendant's status may have facilitated the commission of the abortion, for example, if they were a medical student, a nurse, or a pharmacy employee who provided a pregnant woman with drugs that caused her to abort.

==== Permissibility ====
In Egypt, abortion is permitted when it is deemed necessary to save the pregnant woman from a grave danger that threatens her with death. In accordance with Egyptian legislation, the presence of risk is a mitigating factor in determining criminal liability. This is because it is deemed preferable for society to safeguard a woman who is of benefit to her family, rather than to condemn her on the grounds of an unborn pregnancy. If the individual performing the abortion is a duly qualified medical practitioner, the act is deemed to be within the scope of their professional right to perform medical procedures.

== See also ==
- Fetal rights
- Abortion law
- United States abortion-rights movement.

== Bibliography ==
- Articles of the Egyptian Penal Code, as last amended by Law No. 95 of 2003.
- Rulings of the Egyptian Court of Cassation.
- Crimes against persons and property, Prof. Fattouh Abdullah Al-Shazly, University Publications House, 2010, Alexandria.
- Commentary on the Penal Code (Special Section), Prof. Dr. Fattouh Abdullah Al-Shazly, University Publications House, 1994, Alexandria.
- The Special Section of the Penal Code (Aggression against the Internal Security of the State - Aggression against people in their persons and property), Prof. Dr. Ramses Behnam, Manshaat Al Maarif, 1982, Alexandria.
- Modern Criminal Encyclopedia in Explaining the Penal Code - Part III, Counselor Ihab Abdel Muttalib, National Center for Legal Publications, first edition, 2004.
