= Struycken =

Struycken is a Dutch surname. Notable people with the surname include:

- Arnold Struycken (1900-1955), Dutch lawyer, cousin of Teun Struycken (1906-1977)
- Carel Struycken (born 1948), Dutch actor, brother of Peter
- Peter Struycken (born 1939), Dutch artist
- Teun Struycken (1906–1977), Dutch politician
- Teun Struycken (born 1969), Dutch politician, grandson of previous
