= Pierre Crabitès =

American historian

Pierre Crabitès (1877–1943) was an American historian.

== Life ==
Pierre Crabitès was born in the French Quarter of New Orleans, Louisiana on 17 February 1877. He was of Creole descent. His father was a wealthy French immigrant.

He died in 1943.

== Career ==
He received his MA degree from Tulane University in 1895. He received his LL.B. degree from Loyola University in 1898. He received his LL.D. degree from University of New Orleans in 1918. He then commenced his graduate study at the University of Paris.

He was admitted to the Louisiana bar in 1900. In 1911, President William H. Taft appointed him as the American representative on the Mixed Courts of Egypt in Cairo, Egypt.

== Bibliography ==
Some of his books are:

- The Winning of the Sudan
- Gordon, the Sudan and Slavery
- Ibrahim of Egypt
- Clement VII & Henry VIII
- Americans in the Egyptian Army
- Ismail the Maligned Khedive
- Victoria's Guardian Angel A Study of Baron Stockmar
- Unhappy Spain
- Benes Statesman of Central Europe'
