= Arnold Struycken =

Dutch lawyer

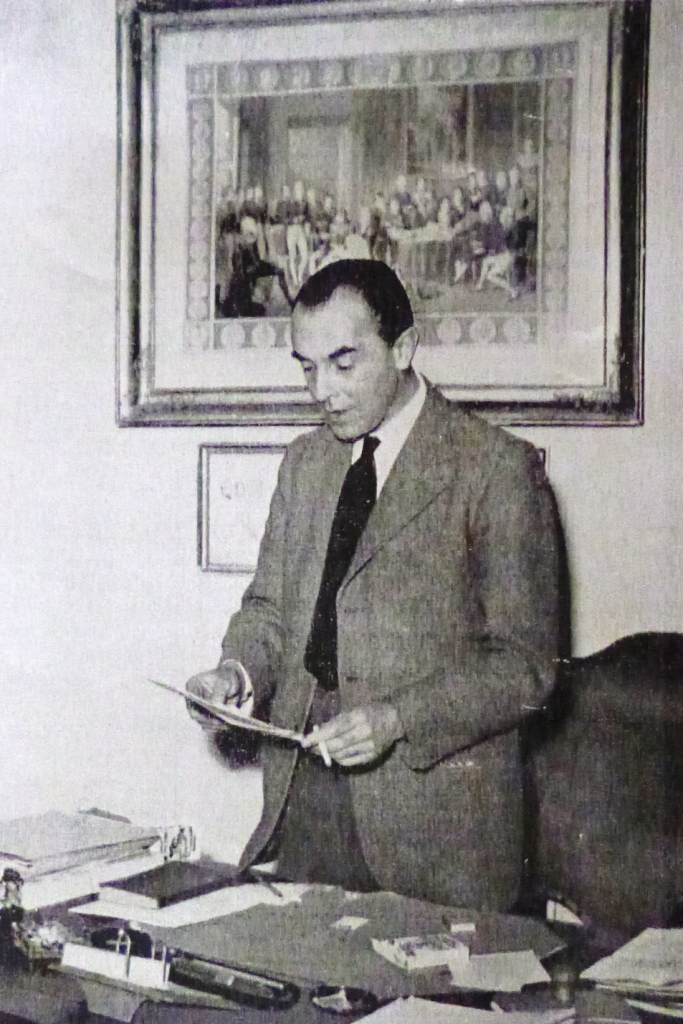
Arnold Struycken at his office of the Council of Europe, in front of a painting depicting the Congress of Vienna.

Arnold J. N. M. Struycken (3 August 1900 – 30 September 1955) was a Dutch lawyer specialized in public international law, judge at the Mixed Courts of Egypt from 1936 to 1949, first Political Director of the Council of Europe from 1949 to 1954, Clerk of the Consultative Assembly of the Council of Europe from 1954 to 1955, with the rank of Deputy Secretary General. He played an important role at the beginning of the Council of Europe and for the creation of the European Convention of Human Rights and the European Court of Human Rights.

== Biography ==
=== Birth and childhood in a family of lawyers ===
Arnold Struycken was born in the Hague in 1900 to a family of Dutch lawyers. His father, Antonius Struycken, was a lawyer and taught law at the University of Amsterdam. He was also a member of the Dutch Council of State, represented the Netherlands at the League of Nations and was a member of the Permanent Court of Arbitration of the Hague and of the Dutch Electoral Committee. Arnold Struycken's cousin was Anton (Teun) Struycken, a Dutch politician member of the Catholic People's Party who was Minister of Justice, Governor of the Netherlands Antilles, Minister of Internal Affairs and member of the Dutch Council of State.

=== Lawyer in the Netherlands ===
After studying law at the University of Amsterdam, Arnold Struycken became a member of the Hague bar and worked for thirteen years as a lawyer. He also had an interest in international public law and co-edited the complete works of his father Antonius. He then became Deputy Secretary of the Central Bureau for Parliamentary Elections and Secretary of various Mixed Courts of Arbitration created by peace treaties after the First World War (Hungary-Czechoslovakia, Hungary-Yugoslavia and Germany-Yugoslavia). In 1929, he became doctor in law at the University of Leiden with a thesis on "Changes in the Rhine Status since the World War". After that, he became secretary of the International Bureau of the Permanent Court of Arbitration of the Hague. In 1933, he published "The international Status of Belgian-Dutch canals".

=== Judge at the Mixed Courts of Egypt ===
In 1936, he left for Egypt where he became a judge at the Mixed Courts of Egypt, in Mansoura and then in Alexandria. These courts had to deal with trials involving non Egyptian citizens and were known for the quality of their judgments. The Montreux Convention, signed on May 8, 1937, and effective on October 15 of the same year, abolished the Capitulations regime in Egypt but kept the Mixed Courts during a 12 years transition period, with some legal restrictions compared to their previous status. During the war, Arnold Struycken volunteered to patrol in the Port of Alexandria, where Italian airplanes and frogmen were trying to place mines, and after that, as an ambulance driver on the Egyptian front during the battle of Al Alamein. An accomplished violinist, he also played music for wounded soldiers in the city hospitals. He came back to Europe in July 1949 and moved to Strasbourg.

=== Political Director and Clerk of the Consultative Assembly of the Council of Europe ===
Arnold Struycken first held the position of Political Director of the Council of Europe from 1949 to 1954 and was as such the Committee of Ministers's main adviser. From May 1954, he was Clerk of the Consultative Assembly of the Council of Europe with rank of Deputy Secretary General, until his early passing in September 1955.

Through his work, started during the summer of 1949 and the creation of the Council of Europe, he played a significant role in the writing of the European Convention of Human Rights, signed on November 4, 1950, and in the creation of a European Commission of Human Rights (from 1954 to 1999) and of the European Court of Human Rights, to which every European citizen can now appeal, as Arnold Struycken had envisioned. He was named rapporteur of the committee of experts in charge, from March 1950, of the preliminary work designed to lay the ground for a European Convention of Human Rights. He also prepared through his works the creation of the future European Economic and Social Committee, created in 1957 by the Treaty of Rome, and the future European Social Charter, adopted in 1961 by the Council of Europe and creating a European Committee of Social Rights.

At the Council of Europe, he worked with the first Secretary General of the Council of Europe from August 1949 to his early passing in July 1953, Jacques Camille Paris, as well as with Léon Marchal, second Secretary General of the Council, with Paul M. G. Lévy from Belgium, first Director of Information and Press at the Council of Europe, Guy Mollet, then the President of the Consultative Assembly of the Council of Europe, and Marius Moutet, dean of the members of the Assembly.

Along with other Council officials, he recommended that the prelude to the Ode to Joy be adopted as European anthem, after it was suggested as early as 1929 by the Count of Coudenhove-Kalergi, President of the Paneuropean Movement. Although the Ode to Joy became the unofficial European anthem in the 1950s, the decision to make it an official anthem was finally taken in 1971 by the Consultative Assembly of the Council of Europe. Arnold Struycken died at the age of 55 years, of a heart attack while at his desk of the Maison de l'Europe in Strasbourg. He was buried in the cimetière du Nord in Strasbourg-Robertsau.

=== Personal life ===
Arnold Struycken married Marie-Louise Maas Geesteranus in 1926 and they had three children, Anton, Arnold and Joséphine.

=== Trivia ===
Arnold Struycken was also an uncle of Anton (Teun) Struycken, a lawyer and European Property Law Professor at the University of Nijmegen, of Carel Struycken (eng), actor playing in Hollywood comedies, in particular as Lurch in The Family Adams, and of the painter Peter Struycken (nl), these last two being sons of his cousin Huib Struycken.
