= Julian M. Wright =

American judge advocate (1884–1938)

- Born: Julian May Wright; February 12, 1884; Douglaston, New York, US
- Died: October 6, 1938 (aged 54); Pas-de-Calais, France
- Education: New York Law School; Massachusetts Institute of Technology
- Occupations: Judge, Attorney
- Employer(s): Ehlerman, Wright & Abbott; Wright & Hill
- Known for: Judge Advocate in the Mixed Courts of Egypt

Julian May Wright (February 12, 1884 – October 6, 1938) was an American attorney and a judge advocate of the international court in Cairo, Egypt.

== Early life ==
Wright was born in Douglaston, Queens, New York, in 1884. His parents were Carolyn Kane (née May) and William Merritt Wright. His maternal grandfather, John Frederick May, was a successful Washington, D.C. physician who had studied in Paris and taught at the University of Maryland and Columbian College (aka George Washington University). When his parents divorced, Wright moved with his mother to her hometown of Washington, D.C.

He was a member of the Washington Fencers' Club, becoming an "expert" under the instruction of M. F. J. Darieulat, maitre d'armes, of Paris. In March 1902, there was "an Assault of Arms" between the Washington Fencers' Club and the United States Naval Academy. Wright was one the three participants of behalf of the club, along with John J. Early and Dayrell Crackanthorpe who was the third secretary of the British embassy.

The match was attended by President Theodore Roosevelt and future president William Howard Taft who was Secretary of War. Other members of the 300 person audience included the Secretary of the Navy John Davis Long, the German ambassador Theodor von Holleben, the French ambassador Jules Cambon, the Russian ambassador Egor Egorovich Staal, the Italian ambassador Edmondo Mayor des Planches, the Belgian minister, the Swiss minister Fernand du Martheray, the Haitian minister Jacques Nicolas Léger, and representatives from the Norwegian and Swedish embassies. Although Wright's tied with his two competitors, his club won the contest. The newspaper said, "Mr. Wright is excellent on attack, his unusually long reach giving his a substantial advantage. After the contest, the president and guests attended a tea hosted by Wright's mother and aunt.

Wright attended the Massachusetts Institute of Technology (MIT) where he studied naval architecture. While at MIT, he was a class director and a member of the Fraternity of Delta Psi (St. Anthony Hall) and the Mandanan Club. He graduated in 1906.

He then attended the New York Law School, graduating in 1912.

== Career ==
After graduating from MIT, Wright worked with the New York Shipbuilding Company in Camden, New Jersey as a naval architect for two years. However, he gave up this career in naval architecture to become a lawyer. While in law school, in 1909, he started working for O'Brien, Boardman & Platt in New York City. He continued to work with this firm until 1915.

In 1915, Wright became a partner in Ehlermann & Hale, later called Ehlermann, Wright & Abbott, with Donald B. Abbott and three graduates of Harvard University—Carl Ehlermann Jr, Swinburne Hale, and Stuart Preston. Their offices were at 165 Broadway in New York City. In 1920, he formed the firm Wright & Hill at 3 Rue Taitbout in Paris, France. His partner, Lovering Hill, was a graduate of Harvard University and volunteered with the American Field Ambulance Corps in France during World War I.

Wright left that firm in 1930 when the Egyptian government offered an appointment of Judge Advocate of the Mixed Court in Cairo, Egypt. Part of the Colonial system, the Mixed Courts of Egypt oversaw cases between Egyptians and foreigners from fourteen Western powers—Austria-Hungary, Belgium, Denmark, England, France, Germany, Holland, Italy, Norway, Portugal, Russia, Spain, Sweden, and the United States. The legal system of these courts was a non-Western polity, with international judges.

Wright sat in this court during a time of great social and political change in Egypt. Cases ranged from international banking, maritime commerce, trademarks and patents to divorce, marriage contracts, and legitimacy—all while navigating different nationalities and religions. A modern attorney notes that, "The judges were not simply technicians, but interpreted rules, customs, and laws to give justice in Egypt." They also "reduced foreign abuse of the Egyptian system…"

Wright was a member of the New York City Bar Association.

== Personal ==
Wright married Alda de Almeida Santos on August 20, 1928. She was from Lisbon, Portugal. They had one daughter, Carol Frances Wright.

He was a member of the Gezira Sporting Club of Cairo, the St. Anthony Club of New York, the Travellers Club in Paris, and the Tuxedo Club.

In 1938, Wright died in Pas-de-Calais, France in at the age of 54 with his mother and wife attending.
