= Egyptian penal code =

Egyptian laws for criminal law

The Egyptian Penal Code (Arabic: قانون العقوبات المصري) is the governing body which determines the provisions related to criminal law, criminal acts, and punishment in the Arab Republic of Egypt.

Under the 2014 Constitution, Article 94, Egypt is established as a state ruled by the law. In Article 95, the Constitution establishes that punishment is determined by the laws of the land. The Penal Code is the supreme legal document concerning crime and punishment. The code was widely influenced by France, and continuously shaped by the British legal system. The most recent version of the Penal Code is from 1937.

== History ==
The origins of the Egyptian penal code date back to the period of time known as the Pharaonic Era or Ancient Egypt. During this era, justice and the law were key elements of society. The powers in the justice system were assigned by the king and followed a hierarchy. In the Pharaonic Era, common law and judicial precedent were main sources of criminal law and procedure with the presence of some written law.

A set of rules and laws that had historical relevance in the development of the Egyptian criminal law and procedure was the Code of Hammurabi, created in 1754 BCE by the Babylonian King, Hammurabi. This code relied heavily on the principles of revenge, and used the idea of "self-protection" as justification for retaliation and punishment.

A final historical aspect that shaped the Egyptian Penal Code is the presence of Sharia Law (Islamic Law.) Sharia Law was and still is widely used across Arab countries as a method of criminal law. After many decades, Egypt abandoned Islamic law and replaced it with positive law.

The following are important codes that represent majorbro changes leading to the adoption and use of the current penal code.

=== Othman Penal Code of 1858 ===
Egypt was under the rule of the Ottoman Empire from 1517 to 1867. The empire decided to create a new penal code after observing the passing of the French Penal Code of 1810. The French Code of 1810 was a source, but the code of 1858 was most closely adapted from the French Penal Code of 1832. The code of 1858 is relevant because it started the separation between religion and the law. Sharia law (Islamic law) was abandoned and the new penal code moved to a more legal frame. In the code, there are notable differences, the first pages presents a rough classification of different types of crimes and their punishments, something that has not been seen before.

The Othman Penal Code of 1858 was widely used by Arab Countries under the rule of the Ottoman Empire. This penal code remained as the guide for criminal law until almost the end of the empire. Additionally, it served as a foundation for the creation of new penal codes in Arab Countries including Egypt.

=== Egyptian Penal Code of 1904 ===
Even before Egypt separated from the Ottoman Empire and became an independent state, it had already started passing its own laws and procedures. Egypt continuously developed new laws and adjustments to the legal system including the penal code.

The element that led to criminal law reform was the creation of mixed courts. Mixed courts had shared jurisdiction on civil and criminal matters. French influence and their legal reform in 1883 pushed criminal law reform in Egypt. In 1904, a new penal code with extensive was put in place. It drew from past codes and codes from other countries. The new code specified criminal law and criminal procedure for the Arab Republic of Egypt.

=== The Egypt Draft Penal Code of 1919 ===
The draft of the Penal Code of 1919 came to life following the orders of Lord Kitchener. A first commission reviewed the code currently in place, which was the Penal Code of 1904. A second commission was in charge of drafting the changes. Although changes were intended to be made starting in 1914, those were not possible given the circumstances of World War I. The changes made to the code were widely influenced by the comparative analysis with other codes from different countries including India, Italy, and Switzerland. The motivation behind the changes was modernization and to fix existing errors.

The original penal code was based on the French Code of 1883. Given the growing influence of Great Britain, the commission decided to adept the code closer in line with English Criminal Law. The draft was divided into four parts dealing with different types of offenses, and it increased the number of articles. The code was available in French, English, and Arabic. A prominent change in the code was the abolition of the minimum penalties and advocacy to change death penalty judgments to corrective sentences. Although the code was never officially published, the changes made on the draft are reflected on the current penal code.

=== Egyptian Penal Code of 1937 (current version) ===
After years of reforms, amendments and changes, in August 1937, the parliament of Egypt voted and passed the Egyptian Penal Code of 1937, which has been continuously amended and still remains in place. This penal code heavily relies on the principle of legality. This means that the law is the highest ranking authority regarding any criminal issues. The penal code becomes the most important guide in dealing with criminal acts and punishment.

This penal code is divided in four broad sections called "Books" which have subdivisions that address specific topics. The code is addressed in terms of articles that explain all the provisions in detail. The code explains jurisdiction in terms of people, location, and courts. This means which people are subject of the rule of the code, where can their crimes be prosecuted, and which courts are in charge of specific issues and matters. The code explains types of crimes and their category. The penal code also explains the procedure of prosecution of crimes.

== Structure ==
The Penal Code in Egypt is divided into four broad books, subsequently divided into different parts and overall contains a total of 395 Articles. It also includes an order from the prime minister and deputy from 1992. A general outline of the code is as follows:

- Book One: General Provisions
  - Part 1: General Rules
  - Part 2: Types of Crimes
  - Part 3: Penalties
  - Part 4: Complicity of Several Person In One Crime
  - Part 5: Attempt
  - Part 6: Criminal Agreements
  - Part 7: Recidivism
  - Part 8: Conditional Execution of Rulings
  - Part 9: Permissibility Causes And Penalty Preventives
  - Part 10: Juvenile Delinquent
  - Part 11: Remission of Sentence And Comprehensive Remission
- Book Two: Felonies and Misdemeanors Prejudicial to The Public Interest And Their Penalties.
  - Part 1: Felonies and Misdemeanors harmful to the Government's Security from a Source Abroad
  - Part 2: Felonies and Misdemeanors Internally Prejudicial to the Government
  - Part 2 bis: Explosives
  - Part 3: Bribery
  - Part 4: Defalcation, Encroachment on, and Peculation of Public Funds
  - Part 5: Excess of Position Limits by Officials, and Laches in Performing their Position Related Duties
  - Part 6: Coercion and Ill-Treatment by Public Officials to Individuals of The People
  - Part 7: Opposing The Rulers, Disobeying their Orders, and Outraging them with Curse and Other Abuse
  - Part 8: Escape of the Jailed and hiding the Felons
  - Part 9: Breaking the Seals, Stealing The Deposited Documents and Official Papers
  - Part 10: Embezzlement of Titles and Positions, and Characterizing Oneself thereby in an unlawful Shape.
  - Part 11: Misdemeanors Connected with Religions
  - Part 12: Damaging the Buildings, Monuments, and other Public Objects
  - Part 13: Interruption of Communications
  - Part 14: Crimes Occurring by Means of Newspapers and Other
  - Part 15: Coins and Spurious Specie
  - Part 16: Forgery
  - Part 17: Trading in Banned Objects, and Counterfeiting Postmarks and Telegraphmarks
- Book Three: Felonies and Misdemeanors Occurring to Individuals
  - Part 1: Killing, Wounding, and Beating
  - Part 2: Arson
  - Part 3: Abortion of Pregnants, Manufacture and Sale of adulterated Syrups or Drugs that are Noxious to health
  - Part 4: Indecent Assault and Corruption of Morals
  - Part 5: Arrest of People and Jailing them without any Legitimate Claim, Stealing Children, and Abducting the Girls.
  - Part 6: False Testimony and Perjury
  - Part 7: Slander, Cursing, and Divulsion of Secrets
  - Part 8: Theft and Usurpation
  - Part 9: Criminal Bankruptcy
  - Part 10: Swindling and Breach of Trust
  - Part 11: Hindering the Auctions, and Deceit Occurring in Commercial Dealings
  - Part 12: Gambling, Lotto Games, and Using Lottery Tickets for Sale and Purchase
  - Part 13: Willful Sabotage, Vitiation, and Destruction
  - Part 14: Encroaching on the Inviolability of Third Party's Property
  - Part 15: Discontinuing Work at Public Utility Department, and Encroaching on the Freedom On Work
  - Part 16: Terrifying, Intimidating "Thuggery"
- Book Four: Violations Related to Public Roads
- Order of The Prime Minister and Deputy General Military Governor No. 4 of the Year 1992

== Criminal Law ==
The Egyptian penal code is the supreme body regarding criminal law. Criminal law is a branch of law used by a country to determine punishment for those committing acts that the state deems detrimental for the wellness of society. The Egyptian penal code is not the only source of criminal law; other sources include the bills passed by the legislature, the judiciary, the executive, and scholars. The purpose of the state is to protect its citizenry. Based on that principle, the state has the right to punish those who commit acts that negatively affect society and in doing so violate the law. Criminal law determines which acts are considered unacceptable and their respective punishments. The underlying purpose of punishment is deterrence. This works as a mechanism of prevention from future actions by the people.

Criminal law started as a way to maintain peace between groups of people. Throughout history, it evolved and shaped in different forms. In some periods of time it was understood as a form of vengeance and retaliation. Later, it evolved as a form to fix problems in society. Most recently, it has been accepted as a mechanism to make amends and bring peace. Currently, criminal law has evolved into a form of protection for the citizenry and as a way to maintain the peace of the state. In Egypt, criminal law has gone through a similar pattern of development. Egypt is different from other parts of the world due to its location as a meeting point between the West and East.

== See also ==
- Penal code (France)
- Principle of legality in French criminal law
