= Egyptian NGO Law =

2002 law

Egyptian NGO Law 84 (2002) establishes two main types of NGOs (non-governmental organizations): Community Development Associations and Civic Foundations.

== Community Development Associations (CDAs) ==
=== Requirements ===
The Founders of CDAs may be either physical or juridical persons. Foreigners must be legally resident in Egypt. Foreign juridical persons must be established in Egypt or authorized to conduct their activities in Egypt; otherwise, they cannot be Founders. There must be at least ten founders, and the purpose of the CDA must not involve the making of profit. The Founders must have written Articles of Association signed by all the Founders, and have suitable headquarters in Egypt.

The Articles of Association must contain:

- The name of the Association, which should be inspired by its purpose, and not confusingly similar to any other Association operating within its geographical area.
- The type and scope of the CDA's activities and its geographical area.
- The address of the headquarters of the CDA.
- The name, title, age, residence and nationality of each Founder.
- The CDA's resources and method of utilization and disposal.
- The representative bodies of the Association, the role of each, the method of electing, discharging and annulling or suspending membership as well as the quorum necessary for valid meetings and valid resolutions.
- System and conditions of membership and rights and obligations of members, particularly each member's right to have access to the Association's documents, attend and cast votes in the general assembly.
- The financial control system.
- Rules of amending the Association's statutes and setting up branches, cases of termination and parties to which the Association's property will devolve in such cases.
- A statement specifying the competent person to apply for an Association to acquire a public-benefit capacity.
- A statement specifying the Founders’ Assembly representative authorized to conduct foundation procedures.

=== Conditions ===
These articles must be duly registered with the Ministry of Social Solidarity, which is obligated to register the CDA within 60 days, unless the Ministry objects in writing. Should they object, the CDA may mitigate the objections within the time specified by the Ministry. Associations (and NGOs in general) are not permitted to form military or para-military formations or detachments; threaten national unity, violate public order or morality or advocate discrimination against citizens, an account of sex, origin, colour, language, religion or creed; practise any political or trade union activity exclusively restricted to political parties and trade unions; or to seek profit or practise any profit-oriented activity. However, adopting commercial controls to generate such income that contributes to the realization of the Association's purposes is permitted. CDAs are exempt from most taxes and customs, and may accept contributions and donations from abroad, with the permission of the Ministry of Social Solidarity. CDAs must have a General Assembly of all active members, and a Board of Directors, of at least five members elected by the General Assembly for six year terms, and subject to the rules indicated in Law 84/2002. The percentage of Egypt Board Members must be at least equal to those of foreign members.

== Civic Foundations ==
These differ from CDAs in that there is no minimum number of Founders. The Founders should have Articles of Association comprising the following information:

- The Foundation name and its geographical jurisdiction and headquarters in Egypt.
- The purpose for which it is established.
- A detailed account of funds appropriated to realize the Foundation's purposes.
- The foundation's management organization, including methods of appointing head and members of boards of trustees and manager.

=== Alternatives ===
A Foundation may also be established under an official deed or registered will, either of which shall be deemed to be the Statute for the Foundation. Each Foundation shall have a board of trustees to be composed of at least three members appointed by founder(s). A Foundation may receive funds from third parties subject to approval by the Minister of Social Solidarity.
