= Mixed Courts of Egypt =

Egyptian civil courts

- المحاكم المختلطة
- Established: October 1875
- Dissolved: 14 October 1949
- Jurisdiction: Civil, commercial and limited criminal cases involving Egyptians and/or foreigners
- Location: Cairo, Alexandria, Mansoura (three main tribunals)
- Authorised by: Charter of 1875, later Egyptian Mixed Codes
- Language: French (proceedings)

The Mixed Courts of Egypt (Arabic: المحاكم المختلطة, transliterated: Al-Maḥākim al-Mukhṭaliṭah, French: Tribunaux Mixtes d'Egypte) were founded in October 1875 by the Khedive Isma'il Pasha. Designed by Nubar Nubarian Pasha to be part of the Khedive's great plans for Egypt, the Mixed Courts led to a radical reform of Egypt's chaotic nineteenth century legal system, where Consular courts competed with Government tribunals and religious courts for jurisdiction. The completion of the Suez Canal (1869) and the development of the cotton trade had attracted a number of foreign interests and foreign nationals to Egypt.

The Mixed Courts had Codes, based on a civil law format inspired by the French Civil Code and British common law but with significant Islamic and local principles. Without suppressing the Consular courts – which would have been diplomatically impossible – the Mixed Courts were intended to streamline legal issues between foreign nationals, and between foreigners and Egyptians. Three courts were established in Cairo, Mansoura and in Alexandria; the proceedings were held in French. Judges were appointed by the Khedive from leading Egyptian and foreign candidates. "The judiciary was at all times under the authority of the rulers of Egypt." There were three districts.

The establishment of the courts, hearing disputes between Egyptians and foreigners and between foreigners of different nationalities, was so successful that new, so-called Native courts were set up in 1883, after the British Occupation of 1882. The 1883 Codes were based on those of 1875, and the judges, mostly Egyptian, tended to follow the Mixed Courts’ interpretation of the law.

The Mixed Courts, by being the foremost judicial authority between 1875 and 1949 (when their functions were transferred to new National Courts) sat in times of political and social change in Egypt. Their decisions reflect the human and commercial history of the area, and involved complicated issues of law. The problems of sovereign immunity, sequestration of enemy property, international banking and maritime commerce were shadowed by the recognition and enforcement of divorces, legitimacy, and marriage contracts affecting people of different religions and nationalities. In between were a whole range of the usual types of legal disputes, such as trademarks and patents, and industrial injuries, without any developed theories at all that could be drawn upon for inspiration, either from inside or outside the country.

== Contribution ==
What, if anything, did the Mixed Courts contribute to the present Egyptian codes? "The laws that were administered by the courts were now divided into 5 codes: (1) the Civil Code, (2) the Commercial Code, (3) the Maritime Code, (4) the Code of Procedure as regards the foregoing Codes, (5) the Penal Code." The greatest change in 1949 was the Civil Code. The Maritime and the Commerce Codes were the old ones retained from 1883, and the Penal Code had been gradually updated.

The Criminal Codes differed from the other codes because it was only administered by the Mixed Courts to a slight extent; "because foreign governments were not willing to abandon their Civil Jurisdiction of their Consuls, therefore they were unwilling to give up the Criminal Code. This resulted in a compromise and what led to the Mixed Courts having limited Jurisdiction in Criminal Matters. It only extended to simple police cases (contraventions), and to (1) offenses committed directly against the judges and officers of the Courts while in the exercise of their functions, as force or violence or bribery; (2) offense committed directly against the execution of the judgements of the Courts; (3) crimes imputed to judges and officers of the Courts, when they have committed them in the exercise of their functions, or in abusing their functions. The greater number of cases were still heard by the Consular Courts."

Well before the closure of the Mixed Courts Abd El-Razzak El-Sanhuri Pasha was appointed as chairman of the Committee set up to draft a new Civil Code. He was assisted by multiple Egyptian jurists, and also by E Lambert, the French jurist. The result of this work was the 1949 Egyptian Civil Code, of 1149 Articles. The background to this eclectic and monumental work has already been described by Sanhouri himself. The 1949 Code was based on a mixture of the previous Mixed and Native codes, together with Egyptian jurisprudence, the Shari’a and various foreign codes from nearly 20 countries. The code was specifically drafted with the Shari’a in mind so that non-Islamic provisions were not consistent with it.

== Shari'a law ==
Thus it may be seen that the custom of the country was upheld as a source of law, and natural law and equity, a major basis of Mixed Court jurisprudence, were both expressly included. In recent years, however, the overriding factor has been Islamic law, and this is now enshrined in the 1971 Constitution, as amended. The Shari’a is the principal source of legislation, and thus it follows that a more “Islamic” interpretation of the law will be in evidence. The Mixed Courts interpreted their codes in an Egyptian manner; the difference now is that an Islamic view, rather than simply an Egyptian one, will be taken, even though it can be argued that as the quality and confidence of the Egyptian judiciary grew in the years to 1949 the type of natural law and equity which was applied in the Mixed Courts was likely to be a blend of Muslim and Christian principles that eventually became more Muslim than Christian. The judges were not simply technicians, but interpreted rules, customs, and laws to give justice in Egypt. The 1949 code confirmed or re-established the Islamic viewpoint, and can be seen as influenced by the Mixed Courts jurisprudence only indirectly.

The Mixed Courts were established in 1875 to reform a chaotic situation. Their immediate effect was to make the Capitulatory Regime in Egypt less intolerable, because their establishment cured multiple ills, and stopped the fraudulent pursuit of claims by foreigners against the Egyptian government and other public Egyptian organisations.

A step forward in the unity of jurisdiction was the establishment of the Native courts in 1883, using codes based on the Mixed Codes. The Native courts and the Mixed Courts were national Egyptian courts. On their merger they became the National Courts.

Thus, giving justice in the name of Egypt, the Mixed Courts were Egyptian courts, and entitled to be regarded as such. Their codes were Egyptian codes and, together with the precedent that arose, were applied as Egyptian law to be used in the forum set aside for “mixed” disputes. There was a continuous creation, evolution, and progress in the law so that judgments were by no means restricted to simple interpretation of the relevant codes. Judgments were oriented towards the litigant. The question was, could the law help the parties and not, could the parties fit in with the written codes or existing law? People were no longer afraid of litigation, and the foremost principle of the rule of law, that no one, not even the ruler, was above the law was radical change for Egypt in the 1870s.

Foreign influence, and diplomatic and political claims against the Egyptian government, gave unscrupulous foreigners rights quite inconsistent with natural justice and equity. However, the establishment of the Mixed Courts reduced foreign abuse of the Egyptian system. Egypt before 1875 was a battleground of powerful forces. Foreign power was often exercised at the expense of Egyptian sovereignty. All this changed after 1875, as order grew from disorder and legal confidence was established. The Mixed Courts imposed the rule of law and thus began the transition of Egypt from a feudal country into a modern and structured state, with a legal climate conducive to commercial and social progress.

One of the reasons the judgments of the Mixed Courts were respected and trusted was that they were not seen by Egyptians as foreign law. In a slow and gradual way the consensus of Egyptian opinion shifted from favor to abolition. The Mixed Courts still had enough familiar principles to retain the confidence of the foreign community.

An efficient system of law and enforcement obviated any necessity for self-help. Egypt was a notoriously litigious country. It was to the benefit of her inhabitants from 1875 that a proper channel of dispute settlement existed between foreigners, and between foreigners and natives.

Parties felt that disputes should be left to settlement by the courts. They became conscious of having certain loosely defined rights. The practice of free legal aid meant that no one was denied justice through an ability to pay. Further, enforcement litigants could see that redress was available and real.

The Mixed Courts had only lasted for 74 years, an insignificant period of time in comparison to Egyptian history, but covering years of profound change in Egypt, and often initiating or facilitating such change. 1949 saw the penultimate step in providing Egypt with a unified and modernized system of law, definitely Egyptian but clearly Western influenced.

== Conclusion ==
The years 1926 to 1937 were years of great change. As the period drew to a close the final chapter in the history of the Mixed Courts began. In the 1920s they had seemed set to endure forever, but by the 1930s rapid and radical political change had sounded a warning note. In a number of ways the Mixed Courts had themselves encouraged the critical analysis, close reasoning, and scholarly research that had led to an educated elite of lawyers in Egypt. Those trained in law were at the front of nationalism, and in a way the Mixed Courts encouraged the very freedom of thought, independence of action, and respect for a national and sovereign rule of law which fostered much of the moderate nationalist opinion. By 1937 the merger of the Mixed Courts was agreed, by 1949 it was taking place.

In essence, this was true culmination of the 1875 reforms. From the beginnings of the Mixed Courts in 1875, to the Native Courts in 1883, and the Montreux Convention reforms in 1937, the various jurisdictions of the Egyptian legal system drew closer together, while at the same time foreign consular jurisdiction lessened. Finally, the whole of Egypt's legal system became unified in 1956. The Mixed Courts paved the way for this to happen by the gradual cycle of reform, development and reform. The fusion of the Mixed and Native Courts provided an up-to-date and solid system.

The Mixed Courts established the rule of law in Egypt, developed a truly Egyptian court system and were the base on which the post-war Egyptian legal system rests. Their direct influence has waned and receded, but without their existence and work between 1875 and 1949, and without their conscientious and dedicated development and operation, the Egyptian legal system after World War II and until the present day would be quite different.

== Judges ==
- Hubert van Asch van Wijck (NL) (Assen (Netherlands) August 30, 1867 – Alexandria (Egypt) November 3, 1935) served in Alexandria from April 1921–1935.
- George Sherman Batcheller (USA) (July 25, 1837, in Batchellerville, New York – Paris (France) July 2, 1908) served 1875–1885 and 1898–1902, Chief Justice of the Tribunal 1883–1885.
- Pieter van Bemmelen (NL) (Almelo July 7, 1821 – the Hague December 19, 1892) served in Ismalia and Cairo 1875–1880.
- Firmin van den Bosch (B) (Peer (Belgium) December 19, 1864 – January 20, 1949) served 1910–1930.
- Jasper Yeates Brinton (USA) served as Justice 1921–1943, as president of the court 1943–1948.
- Guillaume de Brouwer (B) (Ostend, 12 januari 1840 – Ramleh, Egypte, 30 April 1892) served in Ismalia 1875–1883.
- Pierre Crabitès (USA) (New Orleans, Louisiana, 17 February 1877 – Baghdad, (Iraq) 10 October 1943) served as Justice 1911–1936.
- Mohamad Onsy Pacha (Egypt) served as chief justice.
- Arnold Struycken, (NL) (the Hague, 3 August 1900, Strasbourg, 30 September 1955) served as Justice (1936- ?) in Mansoura and then in Alexandria.
- Youssef Zulficar Pasha became vice-president of the Alexandria Mixed Court of Appeal
- Eugène Filâtre de Longchamps (France) (Fougères June 15, 1852 – Paris August 2, 1927) served in Alexandria Judge 1884–1890 vice président 1890-1902
- Julian M. Wright (USA) served as Judge Advocate, Mixed Court in Cairo, 1930–1938

== See also ==
- Extraterritoriality
- Capitulations of the Ottoman Empire
- Egyptian Judicial System
- Montreux Convention Regarding the Abolition of the Capitulations in Egypt
