= Capitulations of the Ottoman Empire =

Contracts conferring rights and privileges to foreign Christian subjects

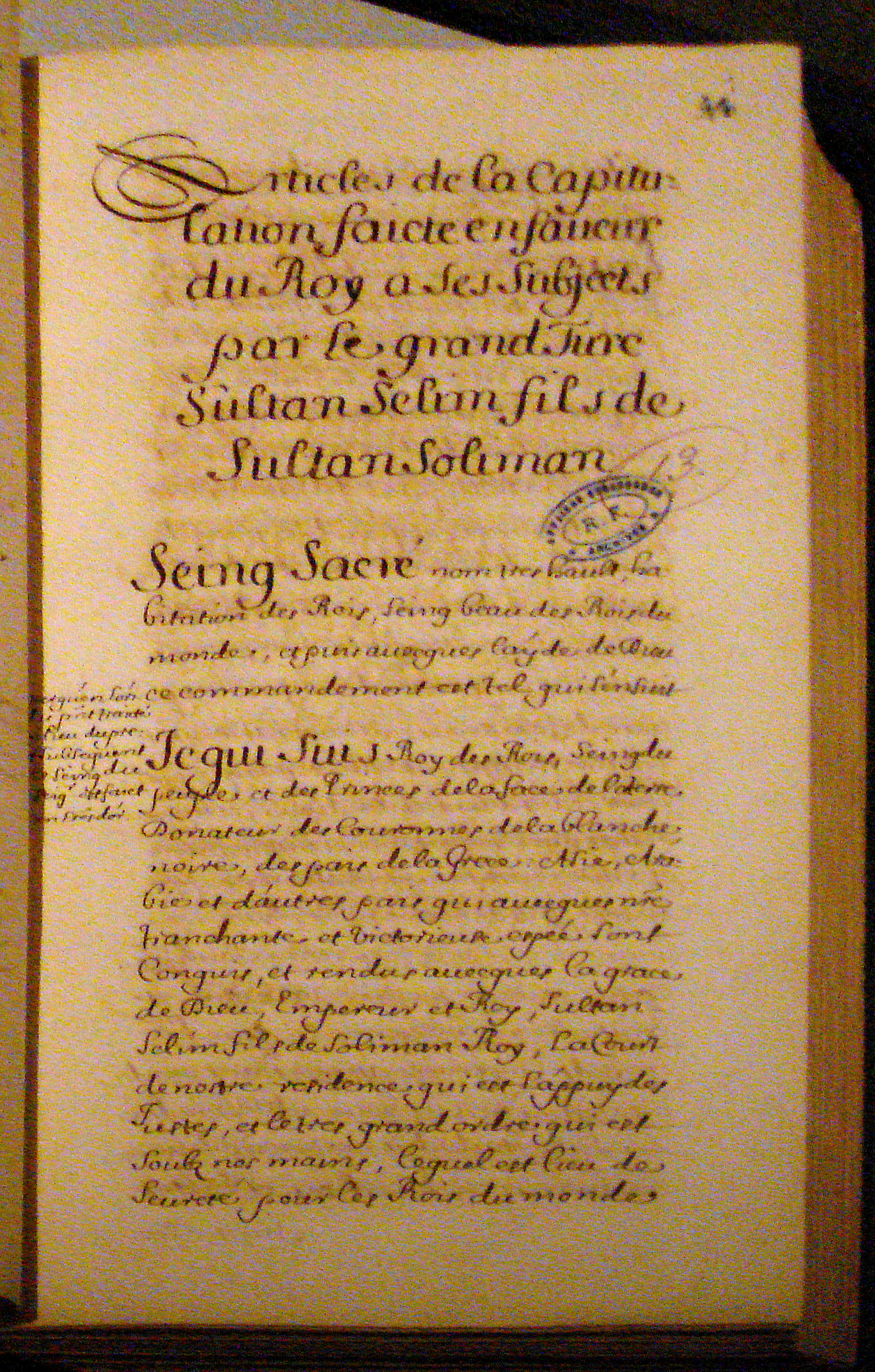
16th century copy of the 1569 capitulations between Charles IX and Selim II

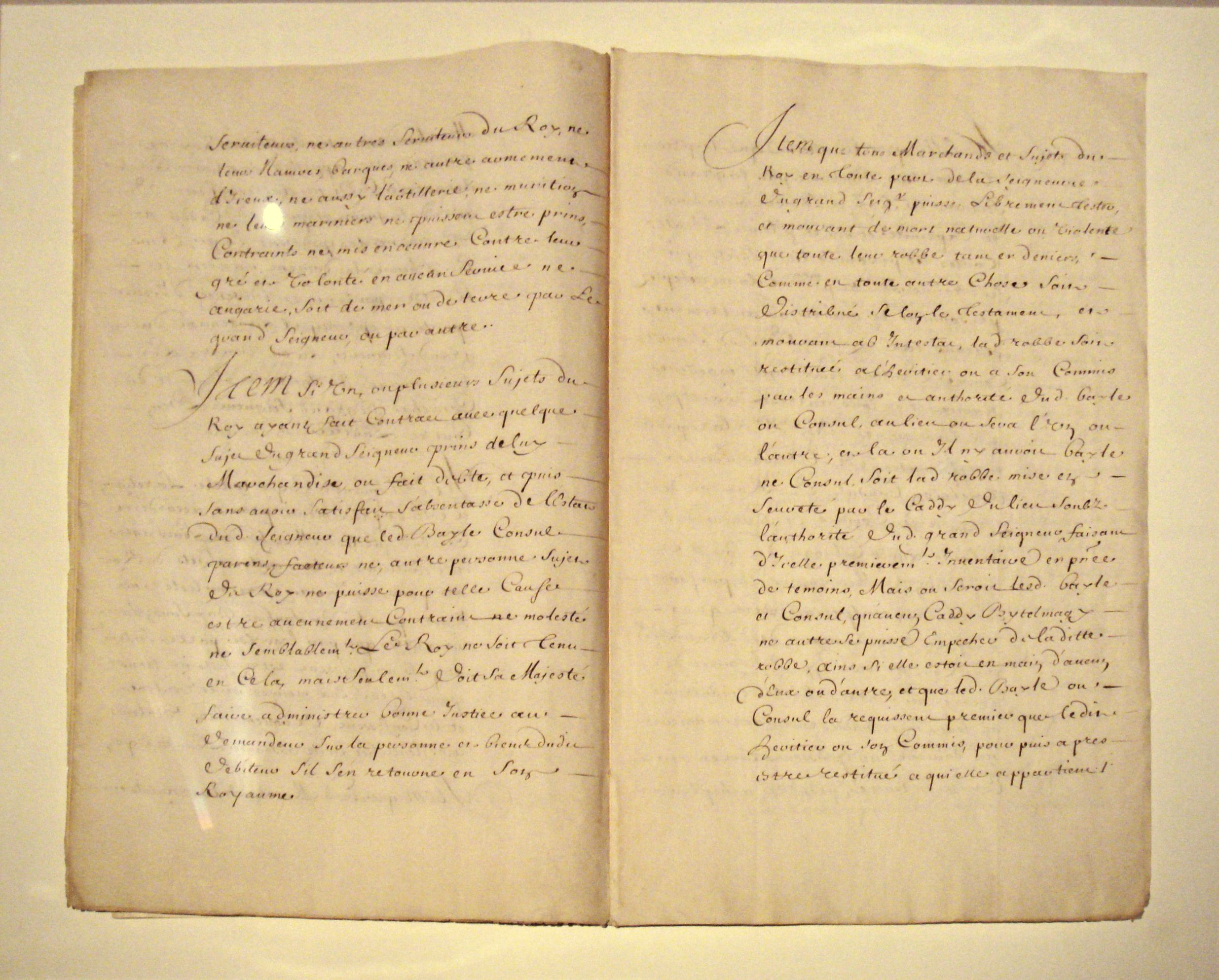
1536 draft of capitulations by French ambassador Jean de La Forêt, intended for negotiation with Ibrahim Pasha a few days before the latter's assassination; this agreement would have expanded to the whole Ottoman Empire privileges received in Egypt from the Mamluks before 1517

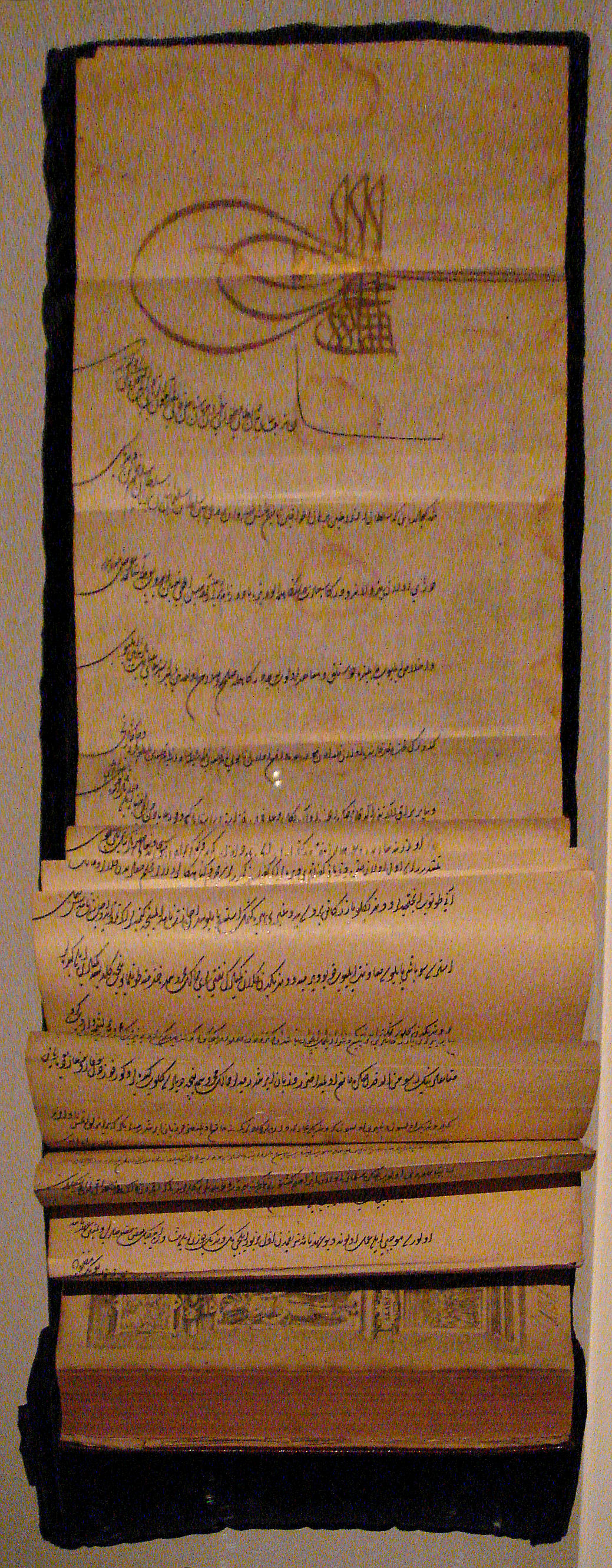
Capitulation reopening trade between Venice and the Ottoman Empire signed 2 October 1540, following the Battle of Preveza.

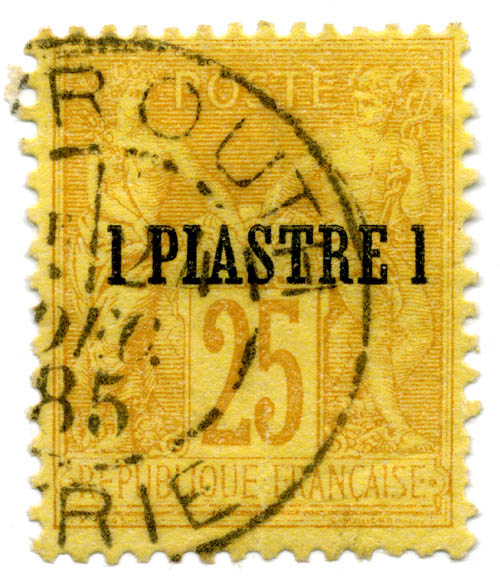
1 piaster overprint on 25-centime Type Sage, used at the French Post Office, Beirut in December 1885

Capitulations of the Ottoman Empire were contracts between the Ottoman Empire and several Christian powers primarily during the 16th century and persisted until 1923. Turkish capitulations, or Ahidnâmes, were generally bilateral acts whereby definite arrangements were entered into by each contracting party towards the other, not mere concessions.

The Turkish capitulations were grants made by successive sultans to Christian nations, conferring rights and privileges in favour of their subjects resident or trading in the Ottoman dominions, following the policy towards European states of the Byzantine Empire.

According to these capitulations, traders entering the Ottoman Empire were exempt from local prosecution, local taxation, local conscription, and the searching of their domicile.

The capitulations were initially made during the Ottoman Empire's military dominance, to entice and encourage commercial exchange with Western merchants. However, after military dominance shifted to Europe, significant economic and political advantages were granted to the European powers by the Ottoman Empire.

== History ==
In the first instance capitulations were granted separately to each Christian state, beginning with the Genoese in 1453, which entered into peaceful relations with the Ottoman Empire. Afterwards new capitulations were obtained which summed up in one document earlier concessions, and added to them in general terms whatever had been conceded to one or more other states; a stipulation which became a most favored nation article. These treaties facilitated the entry of European finished goods into Ottoman markets, granting certain tax and tariff privileges to European merchants, and even some extraterritorial legal rights to allow the French consul to exercise jurisdiction over disputes arising with French merchants instead of the local Islamic Sharia courts. These treaties were generally not disadvantageous to the Ottoman Empire while the Ottomans retained a superior military advantage.

France is generally viewed as having initiated the signature of capitulations. The first well-documented such agreement was concluded in 1569 between Charles IX of France and Selim II. References to earlier agreements between, respectively, Louis XII and Bayezid II in 1500, and Francis I and Suleiman the Magnificent in the mid-1530s, have been questioned by historians, the latter being generally viewed as merely a draft.

The 1673 capitulations renewal between Louis XIV and Mehmed IV established the French Monarchy as protector of all Christians in the Ottoman Empire. That role, however, was never acknowledged by the Pope, and after the Treaty of Küçük Kaynarca of 1774 triggered a competition between France and Russia which eventually played a key role in igniting the Crimean War.

The Ottoman-French Treaty of 1740 marked the apogee of French influence in the Ottoman Empire in the eighteenth century. In the following years the French had an unchallenged position in Levant trade and in transportation between Ottoman ports. Near contemporary Ottoman capitulations to European powers such as Britain and Holland (1737), the Kingdom of Naples (1740), Denmark (1756), and Prussia (1761) were to offset and balance the capitulations granted to France in 1740.

== Status ==
Capitulations signified that which was arranged under distinct headings; the Ottoman Turkish phrase was ahid nameh (عهيد نامه), whereas a "treaty" was mouahede (معاهده). The latter did, and the former did not, signify a reciprocal engagement.

According to capitulations, and treaties confirmatory of them, made between the Porte and other states, foreigners resident in Turkey were subject to the laws of their respective countries.

Thus, although the Turkish capitulations were not in themselves treaties, yet by subsequent confirmation they acquired the force of commercial durable instead of personal nature; the conversion of permissive into perfect rights; questions as to contraband and neutral trade stated in definite terms.

== Abolition ==
On 8 September 1914, the Ottoman Empire's ruling Committee of Union and Progress unilaterally abrogated the capitulations as part of diplomatic maneuverings with Germany and the United Kingdom as to whether the Ottoman Empire would enter World War I. This action prompted a joint protest from the German, Austro-Hungarian, British, French, and Russian ambassadors. The decision was put into effect in early October.

As far as Turkey is concerned, the capitulations were abolished by the Treaty of Lausanne (1923), specifically by Article 28:

Each of the High Contracting Parties hereby accepts, in so far as it is concerned, the complete abolition of the Capitulations in Turkey in every respect.

Capitulations in Egypt ended in 1949 as stipulated in the Montreux Convention Regarding the Abolition of the Capitulations in Egypt in 1937.

== List of capitulations ==
Capitulatory treaties were signed with the following states:

- Venice (1454)
- France (1569, 1673, 1683, 1690, 1740)
- England (1579, 1675)
- United Kingdom (1737, 1809)
- Netherlands (1612, 1634, 1680, 1737)
- Austria (1615?, 1768)
- Russia (1711, 1783)
- Sweden (1737)
- Sardinia (1740, 1825)
- Denmark (1746 or 1756)
- Prussia (1761)
- Spain (1782)
- United States (1830)
- Belgium (1838)
- Hanseatic League (1839)
- Portugal (1843)
- Greece (1854 or 1855)
- Brazil (1858)
- Bavaria (1870)

== See also ==
- Economic history of the Ottoman Empire
- Foreign relations of the Ottoman Empire
- French post offices in the Ottoman Empire
- Chester concession
- Ottoman Public Debt
- Ottoman Public Debt Administration
- Mixed Courts of Egypt
- Protégé system

== Bibliography ==
- Ahmad, F. "Ottoman perceptions of the capitulations 1800-1914," Journal of Islamic Studies, 11,1 (2000), 1-20.
- Boogert, Maurits H. van den (2005). The capitulations and the Ottoman legal system: qadis, consuls, and beraths in the 18th century. Leiden: Brill. xvi, 323p.
- Hoyle, Mark S. W. (1991). Mixed courts of Egypt. London: Graham & Trotman. xxvii, 206p.
- Maurits H. van den Boogert; Kate Fleet, eds. (2003). The Ottoman capitulations: text and context. Rome: Istituto per l'Oriente C.A. Nallino. pp. vii, [575]-727, 14p. of plates : ill., facsims.
- Longva, Anh Nga. "From the Dhimma to the Capitulations: Memory and Experience of Protection in Lebanon." in Religious Minorities in the Middle East: Domination, Self-Empowerment, Accommodation (2012): 47-70. online
- Olson, Robert. "The Ottoman-French Treaty of 1740" Turkish Studies Association Bulletin (1991) 15#2 pp. 347-355 online
- Vlami, Despina. Trading with the Ottomans: The Levant Company in the Middle East (Bloomsbury, 2014).
