= Montreux Convention Regarding the Abolition of the Capitulations in Egypt =

Abolition of the extraterritorial legal system for foreigners in Egypt,

- Type: Multilateral treaty
- Signed: 8 May 1937
- Effective: 15 October 1937
- Original signatories: Egypt; United States; Belgium; United Kingdom; Denmark; Spain; France; Greece; Italy; Ethiopia; Norway; Netherlands; Portugal; Sweden

The Montreux Convention Regarding the Abolition of the Capitulations in Egypt was an international convention concluded on May 8, 1937 that led to the abolition of the extraterritorial legal system for foreigners in Egypt, known as the capitulations. It was signed by the governments of Egypt, the United States of America, Belgium, the United Kingdom, Denmark, Spain (the Republican side in the civil war), France, Greece, Italy, Ethiopia, Norway, the Netherlands, Portugal and Sweden. It went into effect on October 15, 1937, and was registered in League of Nations Treaty Series on the same day.

== Background ==
The capitulations system was introduced into Egypt in the 19th century as a result of pressure by foreign powers on the Egyptian people. After the First World War, a wave of nationalism was on the rise in Egypt, and the government, backed by the newly-established Wafd Party, put growing demands before the British government, which was in control of Egypt, to abolish the capitulations system and to place foreigners under the local Egyptian legal system. As a result, several foreign consular courts were abolished in 1920–1921, while their nationals were placed under British consular jurisdiction. That did not satisfy the demands of the Egyptian government regarding the total abolition of capitulations.

A new opportunity arose following the conclusion of the Anglo-Egyptian Treaty of 1936, when negotiations began to settle the abolition of capitulations in Egypt. That led to the conclusion of the convention.

== Terms ==
The agreement provided for the total abolition of capitulations and the placing of foreigners in Egypt under the Egyptian legal system. The date set for the abolition of the consular courts was October 15, 1949, after a transition period of 12 years.

== See also ==
- Capitulations of the Ottoman Empire
- Mixed Courts of Egypt
