= Timeline of terrorism in Egypt (2013–present) =

Terrorism in Egypt (2013–2025)
- Part of the Egyptian Crisis (2011–2014), the Arab Winter, and Terrorism in Egypt
Date	3 July 2013 – 20 July 2025 (13 years, 4 months, 2 weeks and 5 days)
Location	Egypt
Status	Egyptian Victory

Belligerents
(Egypt) Egyptian Government; Egyptian Armed Forces; Egyptian Army; Egyptian Air Force; Egyptian Navy; Egyptian Air Defence Forces; Egyptian Ministry of the Interior; National Security Service; National Police; Central Security Forces; Sinai Tribal Union	Islamists: Ansar Bait al-Maqdis (until late 2014); Al-Qaeda; Tawhid al-Jihad; Al-Qaeda in Sinai Peninsula (from late 2011); Al-Mourabitoun; Abdullah Azzam Brigades; Ansar al-Sharia; Muslim Brotherhood of Egypt; Hasm Movement; Bedouin tribesmen; Jund al-Islam; Popular Resistance Movement; Takfir wal-Hijra; Army of Islam; Al Furqan Brigades; Soldiers of Egypt; Islamic State (from 2014); Wilayat Sinai (2014–23); Egypt Province; Mujahideen Shura Council; Ansar Bait al-Maqdis (2013–14)

Commanders and leaders
Abdel Fattah el-Sisi; (Egypt) Mostafa Madbouly; Mahmoud Tawfik; Hassan Rashad; Khaled Megawer; Ashraf Salem Zaher; Ahmed Fathy Khalifa; Ashraf Ibrahim Atwa; Mahmoud Abd el-Gawad; Mohamed Hegazy Abdul Mawgoud; Former: Adly Mansour; (Egypt) Hesham Qandil; (Egypt) Hazem El Beblawi; (Egypt) Ibrahim Mahlab; (Egypt) Sherif Ismail; Mohamed Ibrahim Moustafa; Magdy Abdel Ghaffar; Mohamed Fareed; Khaled Fawzy; Abbas Kamel; Mahmoud Hegazy; Salah Al-Badri; Mohammed Farag El Shahat; Sedki Sobhy; Mohamed Ahmed Zaki; Abdel Mageed Saqr; Mahmoud Hegazy; Mohammed Farid Hegazy; Osama Askar; Osama El-Gendi; Osama Mounir Rabie; Ahmed Khaled Hassan Saeed; Younes Hamed; Mohamed Abbas Helmy; Abdul Meniem Al-Toras	Al-Qaeda: Saif al-Adel Ayman al-Zawahiri † Muhammad al-Zawahiri (POW) Abd El-Fattah Salem (POW) Fayez Abu-Sheta † Youssif Abo-Ayat † Saed Abo-Farih †; Islamic State: Abu Hafs al-Hashimi al-Qurashi (Leader of IS) Abu al-Hussein al-Husseini al-Qurashi † Abu al-Hasan al-Hashimi al-Qurashi † Abu Ibrahim al-Hashimi al-Qurashi † Abu Bakr al-Baghdadi † Abu Hajar al-Hashemi (ISIL Emir of Wilayat Sinai) Salim Salma Said Mahmoud al-Hamadin † Abu Osama al-Masri † Shadi el-Manaei † Selim Suleiman Al‑Hara † Abu Kazem al-Maqdisi † Hesham Ashmawy (executed) (Al-Mourabitoun)

Strength
Total: 25,000 (41 battalions)	Total: ≈12,000; ISIL: 1,000–1,500

Casualties and losses
3,277 killed (2013‑2022); 12,280 injured (2013‑2022)	4,059–5,189+ killed
- Total: 5,800+ killed

In July 2013, at the same time as mass protests began against the 3 July coup d'état which deposed Mohamed Morsi, and in parallel with the escalation of the already ongoing jihadist insurgency in the Sinai Peninsula, pro-Muslim Brotherhood militants started violent attacks against policemen and soldiers in central and western Egypt. In the following months, new Islamist armed groups were created to reinstate Islamist rule in Egypt, such as Soldiers of Egypt and the Popular Resistance Movement. Since 2013, violence in mainland Egypt has escalated and developed into a low-level Islamist insurgency against the Egyptian government.

== Chronology ==
Some of the main attacks and arrests are described by year:

=== 2013 ===
- 23 July 2013 – an explosive device killed 1 and injured 19 at a police station in Mansoura.
- 5 October 2013 – gunmen shot dead 6 soldiers near the Suez Canal city of Ismailiya.
- 28 October 2013 – assailants killed 3 policemen who were posted near the University of Mansura in Egypt's Nile Delta region.
- 24 December 2013 – a bomb exploded in Mansoura, targeting the security directorate building, killing 16 and injuring 150.

=== 2014 ===
- 23 to 26 January 2014 – a bombing wave occurs with 13 victims.
- 15 March 2014 – 6 soldiers were killed by bombs at a checkpoint.
- 19 March 2014 – a senior official was killed as well as two members of Ansar Beit Al-Maqdis
- 19 July 2014 – the July 2014 Al-Wadi Al-Gedid attack killed 25 people.
- 5 August 2014 – 7 people were killed.
- 14 September 2014 – 7 high-profile militants were killed by security forces in Suez area.

=== 2015 ===
- 6 March 2015 – 3 policemen were killed in Mahalla.
- 15 April 2015 – 3 military cadets were killed in a bomb attack.
- 24 April 2015 – 4 Muslim brotherhood members were killed by their explosives.
- 9 May 2015 – 4 dead in an exchange of fire between police and members of Muslim brotherhood.
- 29 June 2015 – A top prosecutor was killed by explosives in his car.
- 1 July 2015 – 9 militants were killed by police in Giza.
- 11 July 2015 – A car bomb exploded outside the Italian consulate in the Egyptian capital Cairo resulting in at least 1 death and 4 people injured, responsibility was claimed by IS.
- 17 July 2015 – 6 persons were killed during clashes in Cairo.
- 6 August 2015 – 5 Muslim brotherhood members were shot dead in Fayoum province.
- 24 August 2015 – A bus bombing kills 3 policemen and wounds 33 others.
- 21 September 2015 – Police kill 10 militants in Bahariya Oasis and following a mistake attack of 12 people including Mexican tourists.
- 25 September 2015 – 9 militants were killed following the bombing of the Italian consulate in Cairo.
- 31 October 2015 – Metrojet Flight 9268 was bombed up by the Egyptian sector of the Islamic State while flying from Egypt to Russia. The bombing killed all 224 people on board.

=== 2016 ===
- 8 January 2016 – 2 militants armed with a melee weapon and a signal flare, arrived by sea and stormed Bella Vista Hotel in the Red Sea city of Hurghada, stabbing three foreign tourists from Sweden and Austria. One of the assailants was shot dead and the other was wounded by security forces.
- 21 January 2016 – 9 people including six policemen, and ten others were wounded in Giza when, after raiding an Islamic State hideout, a bomb detonated.
- 29 September 2016 – A car exploded after the passage of the general prosecutor car. One civilian was wounded.
- 28 October 2016 – A bomb killed one and another were wounded. The explosion occurred in Cairo.
- 19 November 2016 – in Cairo one child was killed and another was injured when an improvised explosive device detonated in an apartment in Cairo's Manshiyet Nasser district.
- 9 December 2016 -
  - A civilian died and another 3 were injured in bombing attack in Kafr El Sheikh.
  - 6 police officers and a civilian were killed in a bombing near a checkpoint in the Egyptian capital. 3 additional officers and 4 civilians were wounded by the blast. The Hasm Movement claimed responsibility for the attack.
- 11 December 2016 – At least 25 people were killed and 49 injured after a suicide bombing at a Coptic cathedral in Cairo.
- 12 December 2016 – A military vehicle struck a roadside bomb during a security swoop in North Sinai's city of Sheikh Zuweid, killing four soldiers. IS claimed responsibility for the attack.

=== 2017 ===
- 6 January 2017 – Two Egyptian Coptic Christians were murdered. They were murdered because of their faith, according to the brother of the dead woman.
- 16 January 2017 – Eight Egyptian security officers were killed and 3 others were injured when their checkpoint about 70 km away from the Kharga Oasis was attacked by unidentified militants. At least two of the assailants were killed, while the others escaped.
- 1 April 2017 – A booby-trapped motorbike exploded outside a police training center, killing one police officer and injuring 12 others, as well as 3 civilians.
- 9 April 2017 – 2017 Palm Sunday church bombings
  - At least 45 people were killed and at least 126 were injured in an explosion in a Coptic Church in Tanta, Egypt. Initial investigations show the terrorist blew himself up during the church's Palm Sunday services, causing mass destruction at the scene.
  - Near a police station in Tanta, there was also an attack.
  - A suicide bomber has detonated an explosion outside Saint Mark's Church in Alexandria's Manshyia district. Casualties were reported.
  - There was also an explosion in Chouhada Street in Alexandria.
- 1 May 2017 – A police convoy that was in the Nasr City area of Cairo were attacked after gunmen in two vehicles opened fire. The attack killed three police officers and wounded five.
- 26 May 2017 – 2017 Minya attack 28 people have been killed and 25 wounded after gunmen opened fire on a bus carrying Coptic Christians in central Egypt.
- 1 June 2017 – Three soldiers and one Egyptian army officer were killed in a bomb blast near El-Bawiti in Egypt's Western Desert, the army confirmed in a statement.
- 18 June 2017 – An Egyptian policeman was killed and four wounded by a roadside explosive near the Cairo suburb of Maadi.
- 7 July 2017 – Rafah terror attack
- 7 July 2017 – An Egyptian national security officer was shot dead on Friday by gunmen in the Qalyubiyya Governorate.
- 14 July 2017 -
  - Gunmen ambushed an Egyptian security checkpoint, killing five policemen in an area just south of the capital.
  - 2017 Hurghada attack: Two German tourists and a Czech citizen, who succumbed to her wounds on 27 July 2017 in a hospital in Cairo, were killed and three other tourists were injured when a knifeman attacked a holiday resort in Hurghada. The attacker communicated with the Islamic State via Internet and was given the task of attacking foreign tourists on Hurghada beaches by the group.
- 3 August 2017 – A policeman and a civilian were killed and three people wounded in an attack on a patrol in Esna, south of Luxor.
- 8 August 2017 – A group of gunmen killed two police officers and wounded another in a village north of Cairo.
- 2 October 2017 – Egypt's Interior Ministry announced that the police had killed three suspected militants in a shootout in a southern Cairo suburb. The gunfire exchange took place at a cemetery under construction in 15 May City, a district south of Cairo, as security forces were trying to arrest them. Rifles and ammunition were found at the scene.
- 20 October 2017 – Official Ministry of Interior of Egypt listed 16 police officer deaths, 15 injured and one missing as well as 15 killed or injured terrorists. Reuters and BBC published that 52 policemen were killed; including 23 officers according to Reuters, and 18 according to BBC based on unidentified security sources. This was rebuked State Information service of Egypt.
- 24 November 2017 – The 2017 Sinai mosque attack occurred when a group of gunmen from the Islamic State – Sinai Province entered a mosque in the northern Sinai and killed 311 people and injured 128 others. It is currently the deadliest terrorist attack in Egyptian soil.
- 29 December 2017 – 2017 Saint Menas church attack 11 people have died in twin attacks on Coptic Christians in the southern Cairo: eight civilians and a police officer were killed in a shooting outside a church, and two civilians were killed in a Coptic-owned shop beforehand. One attacker was killed by the police.

=== 2018 ===
- 1 January 2018 – Two Egyptian Christians were shot dead by a gunman as they celebrated the New Year at a liquor store.
- 24 March 2018 – A bomb placed under a car exploded in Egypt's second-largest city Alexandria, killing two people, including a policeman. The bombing, which wounded five others, targeted Alexandria's security chief.
- 2 November 2018 – 2018 Minya bus attack: At least eight Christian Copts were killed and 13 injured when gunmen opened fire on them when they were travelling by bus from the city of Sohag to St. Samuel's monastery, Islamic State claimed responsibility.

=== 2019 ===
- 5 January – An explosives expert was killed and two other policemen injured in Cairo while trying to defuse a bomb.
- 12 January – Egyptian police killed six suspected extremists in the country's south, in Sohag Governorate.
- 17 January – Islamic militants kidnapped a Christian man, a police forensics expert, in North Sinai. Police who tried to rescue the man killed one militant and injured two others, while suffering two of their own wounded.
- 22 January – Egypt says at least seven troops, including an officer, were killed in clashes with militants in recent operations in northern Sinai. They said 59 suspected militants were killed while another 142 were arrested. The military gave no timeframe for these operations.
- 5 February – Four policemen were injured in an ambush on a police checkpoint in New Valley Governorate. IS claimed responsibility.
- 12 February – A soldier and a recruiter were killed when IS snipers opened fire on them in an area near Rafah, North Sinai. Other recruits were also injured.
- 16 February – Eleven soldiers were killed and four were wounded when IS militants attacked a checkpoint in North Sinai. Seven militants were also killed.
- 18 February – An explosion in Cairo killed two policemen who were chasing a man believed to have planted an explosive device last week near a mosque. The explosion also killed the bomber.
- 19 February – A policeman who was injured in the Cairo bombing yesterday succumbed to his wounds. Meanwhile, Egyptian security forces killed 16 suspected militants in two separate raids in Arish city, North Sinai Governorate. No mention was made of any security casualties.
- 20 February – Nine men convicted by the Egyptian government of involvement in the assassination of Attorney General Hisham Barakat in 2015 were executed.
- 7 March – Security forces killed seven suspected militants in two operations in Giza, close to Cairo. One police officer was wounded. The government believes the militants were members of the Hasm group.
- 11 March – Egyptian security forces have killed 46 suspected militants in North Sinai recently, the military said.
- 7 April – Gunmen opened fire on a police vehicle in Cairo, killing a police officer and the driver, while wounding two others.
- 9 April – A 15-year old suicide bomber attack a market in Sheikh Zuweid, North Sinai, killing four policemen and three civilians and injuring 27 others.
- 16 May – Egyptian security forces killed 47 suspected militants during operations in the Sinai peninsula recently. Five military personnel were also killed. No timeframe was given.
- 19 May – At least 17 people were injured in an explosion which targeted a tourist bus close to the Giza Pyramids. Seven of the injured were South African tourists.
- 20 May – Egyptian security forces killed 12 suspected fighters in Cairo, according to the Egyptian Interior Ministry. The ministry said the militants belonged to the Hasm group, but did not say if they were involved in yesterday's explosion in Giza that wounded tourists.
- 21 May – Egypt's Interior Ministry said 16 suspected militants were killed during a raid in Arish, North Sinai. It did not say when the raid took place.
- 5 June – Militants attacked a police checkpoint in Arish, North Sinai, killing at least eight police officers and wounding three more. A warplane followed the militants as they were pulling back, eventually striking the getaway vehicle, killing at least five militants. The vehicle that was destroyed may have been a tank that was captured during the raid on the checkpoint.
- 6 June – Egyptian security forces said they killed 14 suspected militants in Arish, North Sinai. The militants were believed to have been involved in the raid yesterday that killed eight police officers.
- 7 June – Security forces in Egypt killed another eight militants suspected to have been involved in the killing of eight policemen in Arish, North Sinai, on June 5.
- 8 June – Four more militants, suspected of involvement in the June 5 raid in North Sinai that killed eight policemen, were killed after a military operation.
- 13 June – Six policemen were wounded by a roadside bomb targeting a police patrol in Arish, North Sinai. At least 14 civilians were kidnapped in the same area over the past day.
- 22 June – Four civilian workers were killed in an attack near El Arish International Airport, North Sinai. The workers were building a fence around the airport when they were suddenly shot at. Another five workers were wounded and two vehicles were destroyed.
- 25 June – Militants attacked checkpoints and an assembly center in the North Sinai city of Arish, killing seven police officers and a civilian. Four militants, including a suicide bomber, also died in the attacks.
- 17 July – Nine people were kidnapped by militants on a road near Bir al-Abd, with six of them later executed by IS for allegedly acting as spies for the Egyptian government, according to Amaq.
- 18 July – A suicide attack in Sheikh Zuweid left a soldier and another person dead, along with the suicide bomber. The same day, unknown gunmen killed three civilians near Hasna city in central Sinai peninsula.
- 20 July – British Airways cancelled flights to Cairo for a week, while Lufthansa cancelled flights only for a day, over unspecified security concerns.
- 4 August – A car rammed into three other cars parked outside the National Cancer Institute and subsequently exploded, killing 20 people and injuring at least 47 others. The car reportedly contained explosives. The Egyptian government claimed it was a terrorist attack committed by the Hasm Movement, which denied responsibility.
- 8 August – Security forces reportedly raided the hideouts of Hasm Movement members in Cairo and Faiyum Governorate in response to the August 4 Cairo bombing. The Interior Ministry said at least eight militants were killed in Atsa, Faiyum, after they opened fire on police, while another seven militants were killed in Cairo's Shorouk suburb during a firefight. There were no reports of civilians or security casualties.
- 5 September – Six suspected militants were shot dead during a police raid in the Bahariya Oasis 300 kilometers southwest of Cairo.
- 18 September – Egyptian police said they killed nine suspected Liwa al-Thawra militants in two suburbs of Cairo.
- 24 September – Six "members of the Muslim Brotherhood" were killed during a police raid in 6th of October city.
- 27 September – An Islamic State ambush on Egyptian troops in Bir al-Abed, North Sinai, left eight soldiers dead, along with a civilian. Government sources said 15 militants were killed by soldiers during the attack.
- 29 September – Egyptian police killed 15 militants in a raid on a hideout in al-Arish.
- 12 October – At least nine people were killed and six more wounded when a roadside bomb exploded in Bir al-Abd. Seven security forces were wounded in two other militant attacks in North Sinai Governorate: one in Bir al-Abd and the other in Rafah.
- 28 October – A police conscript was killed and three other policemen were wounded when militants attacked them in Sheikh Zuweid, North Sinai Governorate.
- 29 October – A police raid in el-Arish, North Sinai Governorate, left 13 suspected militants dead.
- 4 November – The Egyptian army said 77 extremists and six other "highly dangerous" militants were killed while an officer and two soldiers were killed or wounded in operations in the Sinai Peninsula from October 28 to November 4.
- 9 November – Two members of the security forces were killed and two more were wounded when their armored vehicle struck a roadside bomb in Rafah, North Sinai Governorate.
- 11 November – Three policemen were killed by unidentified militants at a security checkpoint in the Kafr al-Hasafa village in Qalyubia Governorate.
- 17 November – Three security personnel were killed and four more were wounded by a roadside bomb in Sheikh Zuweid, North Sinai Governorate.
- 8 December – A police conscript was killed and two more were wounded in a militant attack on a checkpoint in Rafah, North Sinai Governorate. One militant was also killed in the clash, while several others were wounded.

=== 2020 ===
- 15 January – Militants executed a person they claimed was an "agent" of the Egyptian military in the Sheikh Zuweid area of North Sinai Governorate.
- 25 January – Wilayet Sinai claimed to have killed an Egyptian soldier with a sniper south of Rafah, North Sinai Governorate. Meanwhile, Egyptian security forces killed 12 "terrorist operatives" west of al-Arish.
- 5 February – Five conscripts were shot dead after militants stopped their taxi in central Sinai.
- 6 February – An IED east of al-Arish, North Sinai Governorate, killed three soldiers, including an officer.
- 9 February – The Egyptian army said a clash near Sheikh Zuweid, North Sinai Governorate, left 10 militants and seven soldiers, including two officers, dead.
- 12 February – An IED killed an Egyptian Brigadier General near Bi'r al-Abd, North Sinai Governorate. Islamic State Wilayet Sinai claimed responsibility.
- 25 February – An IED killed an Egyptian Lieutenant Colonel and three other soldiers east of Al-Arish, North Sinai Governorate. Islamic State Wilayet Sinai claimed responsibility.
- 2 March – Wilayet Sinai executed two "agents" it accused of working with the state south of Bir al-Abd, North Sinai Governorate.
- 4 March – Hesham Ashmawy, a prominent al-Qaeda militant who helped establish Ansar Beit al-Maqdis in 2011, was executed by the Egyptian state.
- 13 March – A commander in Wilayet Sinai was killed during fighting with the Egyptian army and local tribes in the Rafah area of North Sinai Governorate.
- 14 March – A failed assassination on a police commander in Bir al-Abd, North Sinai Governorate, left one soldier dead.
- 26 March – An Egyptian army camp west of Rafah, North Sinai Governorate, was attacked by armed men who killed two soldiers and wounded three more.
- 28 March – An IED detonated under an army tank in Bir al-Abd, North Sinai Governorate, killing four soldiers. Meanwhile, airstrikes reportedly killed 16 militants and wounded six more south of Rafah, North Sinai Governorate.
- 14 April – A firefight between armed militants and security forces in Cairo's Amiriyah District left one policeman dead and three more wounded. Seven militants linked to Wilayet Sinai were reportedly planning to target Christians during the upcoming Easter holiday before being killed.
- 30 April – Ten soldiers were killed or injured when a bomb exploded in an armored vehicle south of Bir al-Abd, North Sinai Governorate.
- 1 May – Egyptian forces killed two militants in operations in North Sinai Governorate, according to the Egyptian army.
- 3 May – Egyptian forces killed 18 militants during a firefight in Bir al-Abd, North Sinai Governorate, according to the Interior Ministry.
- 15 May – A raid on a farm in North Sinai Governorate carried out by Egyptian security forces left one militant dead. Another six militants who fled to a desert hideout were tracked down and killed as well.
- 23 May – Egyptian forces reportedly killed two separate groups of 21 militants total in North Sinai Governorate, while two army officers were injured. Both groups were allegedly planning attacks for the Eid al-Fitr holiday.
- 29 May – Two members of the Tarabin tribe were killed while fighting Wilayat Sinai in North Sinai Governorate.
- 30 May – According to sources, including the Egyptian military, 19 militants were killed during operations in the Sinai Peninsula, while two officers and three conscripts were killed when their vehicle struck an IED.
- 7 June – One member of the Sinai Tribal Union who was kidnapped two months ago was executed by Wilayat Sinai in southern Rafah, North Sinai Governorate.
- 27 June – The Egyptian state executed Libyan militant Abdelrahim Mohamed al-Mesmari, who participated in attacks on policemen and Coptic Christians in Egypt's western desert area in 2017. He was affiliated with the little-known Al-Qaeda-linked group Ansar al-Islam.
- 21 July – According to the Egyptian army, two soldiers and 18 militants were killed during a thwarted attack on a military post in Bir al-Abd, North Sinai Governorate.
- 30 August – The Egyptian army announced that 73 militants were killed in operations in North Sinai Governorate from July 22 and August 30. Three officers and four soldiers were "killed or wounded" in the same timeframe.
- 23 September – The Interior Ministry said three policemen were killed while preventing a prison break by Ansar al-Sharia inmates in a Cairo prison. Four death row inmates were killed in the break out attempt.
- 17 December – Three security personnel were killed and 10 more were wounded in two separate bomb attacks in Sheikh Zuweid town, North Sinai Governorate. Raids carried out after the bombings left four militants dead.

=== 2022 ===
- 7 May – 11 Egyptian Soldiers were killed in attack near the Suez Canal.

=== 2023 ===
- 17 September – 7 Egyptian soldiers were killed in an explosion at an air defense base in the North Sinai Governorate.

=== 2025 ===
- 20 July – Egyptian police announced that they killed two terrorists linked to the Hasm Movement in a shootout during a raid in Giza, one civilian was killed by stray fire during the shootout and one police officer was injured

== Casualties ==
Year	Deaths	Injuries
2013	103	Unknown
2014	195	Unknown
2015	272	Unknown
2016	101	Unknown
2017	106	Unknown
2018	7	5
2019	Unknown	Unknown
2020	Unknown	Unknown
2021	Unknown	Unknown
2022	11+	Unknown
2023	7	Unknown
2024	Unknown	Unknown
2025	Unknown	Unknown
2026	Unknown	Unknown
Total	739	Unknown
