= Arish hotel bombing =

2015 terrorist attack in Egypt

Coordinates: 31.133916°N 33.766811°E

2015 Arish attack
- Part of the Sinai insurgency
- Al-Arish (Egypt)
- Location: Al-Arish, North Sinai, Egypt
- Date: 24 November 2015; 07:00 (EET)
- Target: Election officials, security forces
- Attack type: Suicide bombing, car bombing, shooting
- Weapons: Car bomb, explosive belt, automatic gun
- Deaths: 7
- Injuries: 10+
- Perpetrators: Islamic State of Iraq and the Levant: Wilayat Sinai (formerly known as Ansar Bait al-Maqdis)

The Arish hotel bombing was a terrorist attack on a hotel in the coastal city of Al-Arish, Egypt, on 24 November 2015. A group of militants approached the heavily guarded hotel with a car bomb, but Egyptian security forces opened fire at the vehicle, blowing it up before it could reach the building. One of the two attackers managed to get inside the hotel, where a number of people were injured and killed as a result of gunfire and a subsequent suicide bombing. Authorities reported at least seven dead, including two judges who had been in Al-Arish to supervise the country's second round of parliamentary elections, held the day before. The Islamic State's Wilayat Sinai offshoot claimed responsibility in a statement released later the same day.

== Attack ==
The attack began at around 7 a.m. when a vehicle driven by a suicide bomber approached the area of the Swiss Inn Resort in Al-Arish. The car exploded after security forces opened fire, but another militant managed to gain entry into the building, shooting several people and detonating his suicide belt near the kitchen area. The hotel had been housing judges responsible for overseeing the second round of parliamentary elections, which was held the day before the assault.

== Responsibility ==
The Islamic State's Wilayat Sinai branch claimed responsibility for the attack in a statement posted on social media. The group said it was in response to the Egyptian government's imprisonment of women, but it did not provide further details.

== Impact ==
The attack on the Swiss Inn hotel in al‑Arish claimed at least seven lives, including two election judges, two policemen, and one civilian, with 12–14 others injured, such as security personnel, judges, and hotel staff. According to state agency reports, two attack methods were used: a suicide car bomber was shot before reaching the hotel, and a gunman and suicide vest-wearer then entered the lobby and kitchen, resulting in the fatalities and injuries.

Authorities described the assault as a deliberate attempt to “hinder the state from building its institution,” aiming to disrupt the electoral process. The Justice Ministry and Judges Club expressed that the judiciary would proceed undeterred, asserting judges' readiness "to sacrifice their lives" in defence of state institutions.

The military pledged to intensify counter‑terror operations in North Sinai; announcing a reinforced campaign to “weed out” militant networks and safeguard future judicial and electoral activities.

=== Regional impact ===
This bombing was part of a cycle of terrorist activity in North Sinai, including prior attacks in January and July 2015. In the aftermath of those earlier strikes, residents reported mass arrests, widespread detention, and a heavy security crackdown with armoured vehicles deployed across al‑Arish. The November hotel bombing continued this tradition, with authorities further tightening checkpoints, increasing patrols, and launching raids on suspected militant hideouts.

Northerners in al‑Arish reported a palpable fear of arbitrary detention and home-searches in the wake of prior attacks; a pattern repeated after the November 2015 explosion. Damage to infrastructure extended beyond the hotel; nearby government buildings, media offices, and homes suffered shattered windows and structural harm.

== See also ==
- Sinai insurgency
- Operation Martyr's Right
- July 2015 Sinai clashes
