= Sinai insurgency =

Islamist insurgency in the Sinai Peninsula

- Part of terrorism in Egypt, the Egyptian Crisis, and the Arab Winter
Date	5 February 2011 – 25 January 2023 (11 years, 11 months, 2 weeks and 6 days)
Location	Sinai Peninsula, Egypt
Result	Egyptian government victory: ISIS militants turn to low-level insurgency; By 2023, the Islamic State – Sinai Province appeared to be completely dormant

Belligerents
Egypt; Supported by: Sinai Arab Tribes Union; Multinational Force and Observers; United Arab Emirates Israel	Islamists: Ansar Bait al-Maqdis (until late 2014); Al-Qaeda; Hasm Movement; Bedouin tribesmen; Jund al-Islam (until 2020); Al-Mourabitoun; Popular Resistance Movement; Takfir wal-Hijra; Army of Islam; Al Furqan Brigades; Soldiers of Egypt (until 2015); Islamic State (2014–present)

Commanders and leaders
Abdel Fattah el-Sisi (Egypt) Mostafa Madbouly; Mahmoud Tawfik; Mohamed Ahmed Zaki; Osama Askar; Ashraf Ibrahim Atwa; Mohamed Hegazy Abdul Mawgoud; Ashraf Ibrahim Atwa; Ibrahim al-Arjani Former: Hosni Mubarak; Mohamed Morsi; Adly Mansour; (Egypt) Ahmed Shafik; (Egypt) Essam Sharaf; (Egypt) Kamal Ganzouri; (Egypt) Hesham Qandil (POW); (Egypt) Hazem El Beblawi; (Egypt) Ibrahim Mahlab; (Egypt) Sherif Ismail; Mahmoud Wagdy; Mansour el-Essawy; Mohamed Youssef Ibrahim; Ahmed Gamal El Din; Mohamed Ibrahim Moustafa; Magdy Abdel Ghaffar; Mohamed Hussein Tantawi; Sedki Sobhy; Sami Hafez Anan; Mahmoud Hegazy; Mohammed Farid Hegazy; Mohab Mamish; Osama El-Gendi; Osama Mounir Rabie; Ahmed Khaled Hassan Saeed; Reda Mahmoud Hafez Mohamed; Younes Hamed; Mohamed Abbas Helmy; Abd El Aziz Seif-Eldeen; Abdul Meniem Al-Toras; Aly Fahmy Mohammed Aly Fahmi	Al-Qaeda: Muhammad al-Zawahiri (POW) Abd El-Fattah Salem (POW) Fayez Abu-Sheta † Youssif Abo-Ayat † Saed Abo-Farih †; Islamic State: Abu Hajar al-Hashemi (ISIL Emir of Wilayat Sinai) Salim Salma Said Mahmoud al-Hamadin † Abu Osama al-Masri † Shadi el-Manaei † Selim Suleiman Al‑Hara † Abu Kazem al-Maqdisi †

Units involved
Egypt: Egyptian Army; Egyptian Ministry of the Interior; National Security Service; National Police; Central Security Forces; Sinai Tribal Union; Israel: Israeli Air Force	Al-Qaeda; Tawhid al-Jihad; Al-Qaeda in Sinai Peninsula (2011–2018); Abdullah Azzam Brigades (until 2015); Ansar al-Sharia (until 2018); Islamic State (2014–present): Wilayat Sinai; Mujahideen Shura Council (until 2013)

Strength
Total: 25,000 (41 battalions)	Total: ≈12,000 ISIL: 1,000–1,500

Casualties and losses
3,277 killed (2013–2022); 12,280 injured (2013–2022) IDF: 4 killed Hamas: 3 killed (Note: 2 border guards killed in an ISIS bombing at Rafah Crossing, and 1 Hamas operative killed in an ISIS execution video.)	3,076 killed
- Civilian fatalities: 1,539+ Egyptian, 219 Russians, 4 Ukrainians, 1 Belarusian, 3 South Koreans, 3 Vietnamese, 2 Germans, 1 Croatian; Total: 10,000+ killed

The Sinai insurgency was an insurgency campaign in the Sinai Peninsula of Egypt launched by Islamist militants against Egyptian security forces, which also included attacks on civilians. The insurgency began during the Egyptian Crisis, during which the longtime Egyptian president Hosni Mubarak was overthrown in the 2011 Egyptian revolution.

The campaign initially consisted of militants, mainly local Bedouin tribesmen, who exploited the chaotic situation in Egypt to launch a series of attacks on government forces in Sinai. In 2014, members of the Ansar Bait al-Maqdis group pledged allegiance to the Islamic State of Iraq and the Levant (ISIL, or ISIS) and proclaimed themselves Sinai Province, with some security officials stating that militants based in Libya established ties with the Sinai Province group and blaming the porous border and ongoing civil war for the increase in sophisticated weapons available to the Islamist groups.

Egyptian authorities attempted to restore their presence in the Sinai through both political and military measures. The country launched two military operations, known as Operation Eagle in mid-2011 and Operation Sinai in mid-2012. In May 2013, after the abduction of Egyptian officers, violence in Sinai resurged. Following the overthrow in July 2013 of Egyptian president Mohamed Morsi, "unprecedented clashes" occurred.

Hundreds of homes were demolished and thousands of residents were evacuated as Egyptian troops built a buffer zone to halt the smuggling of weapons and militants to and from the Gaza Strip. A report compiled by a delegation from the National Council for Human Rights (NCHR) stated that the displaced families were suffering due to government negligence, unavailability of nearby schools, and a lack of health services. From the start of the conflict, dozens of civilians were killed, either in military operations or kidnapped, and then beheaded by militants. In November 2017, more than 300 Sufist worshippers were killed and over 100 injured in a terrorist attack on a mosque west of the city of Al-Arish.

== Background ==
The Sinai Peninsula has long been known for its lawlessness. Historically, it has served as a route for the smuggling of weapons and supplies. Security provisions in the Egypt–Israel peace treaty of 1979 mandated a diminished security presence in the area, enabling militants to operate with a freer hand.

Moreover, the inhabitants of the Sinai Peninsula have expressed grievances regarding their economic marginalization for several decades. This sentiment is exacerbated by perceived injustices, particularly concerning the inequitable distribution of revenues from the tourism sector. The seaside resorts of South Sinai currently represent the peninsula's sole economic assets. However, according to various accounts, the local population derives minimal benefit from this economic activity, as the central authorities in Cairo reportedly reserve land acquisition and employment opportunities for migrants from the Nile Delta. Also, the limited government-directed investment and development in Sinai has discriminated against the local Bedouin population, which values tribal allegiance over all else. The combination of Sinai's harsh terrain and its lack of resources have kept the area poor and ripe for militancy.

Following the January 2011 uprising that toppled Hosni Mubarak's regime, the country became increasingly destabilized, creating a security vacuum in the Sinai Peninsula. Radical Islamic elements in Sinai exploited the opportunity to launch several waves of attacks against Egyptian military and commercial facilities.

According to The Economist, the conflict also involves local armed Bedouins "who have long-standing grievances against the central government in Cairo" and that "they are barred from joining the army or police; they find it hard to get jobs in tourism; and they complain that many of their lands have been taken from them".

== Timeline ==
=== 2011–2012 ===
Since the 2011 uprising against the Mubarak regime in Egypt, there has been increasing instability in the Sinai Peninsula. In addition, the collapse of the Libyan regime increased the quantity and sophistication of weapons being smuggled into the area. The situation provided local Bedouin with an opportunity to assert their authority, leading to clashes with Egyptian security forces, but the cause of violence soon transitioned to salafi jihadism. Hard-line militant Muslims used Sinai as a launch-point for attacks against Israel and turned on the Egyptian state, focusing on Egypt's security establishment and the Sinai's Arab Gas Pipeline.

==== Operation Eagle ====
In August 2011, Egypt launched Operation Eagle in an effort to restore law and order, driving Islamist insurgents and criminal gangs out of North Sinai's urban centers, and to attempt to sever the link between militant groups in the Sinai and Gaza by augmenting its control over the Gaza border crossing.

The operation had limited success, and a week into the operation, Salafi jihadists carried out the biggest cross-border attack on Israel in the post-Mubarak period.

==== Operation Sinai ====
On 5 August 2012, an attack on the Rafah barracks shook the Egyptian military and population. Only a month into his term, President Mohamed Morsi sacked the longstanding defence minister and promoted General al Sisi in his place. Operation Sinai was launched, aimed at eliminating armed Islamist groups, protecting the Suez Canal, and destroying the tunnel network connecting the Sinai with the Gaza Strip. During the operation, 32 militants and suspects were killed and 38 arrested, while 2 civilians were killed by early September 2012.

=== 2013–2014 ===
Since the July 2013 coup against President Mohamed Morsi, a Muslim Brotherhood leader, Egyptian military and security services in particular were targeted by Sinai-based Islamist groups. In an increase in violence, security forces came under near daily attack throughout July to August 2013.

In 2013, the new authorities adopted a more aggressive strategy, leading to mass arrests and harsh security measures. Over the few months leading to 2014, the Egyptian army gained the upper hand in the battle against militias that had found safe haven in the peninsula. After isolating and largely clearing the populated northeastern Sinai, the army put many militant factions on the defensive, most notably Ansar Bait al-Maqdis. However, one thousand armed militiamen were still sheltering in the main stronghold in Jabal Halal, as well as Jabal Amer area.

In November 2014, the situation in the Sinai was thrust into the spotlight with the deadliest attack on the security forces since 2011, and the group responsible Ansar Bayt al-Maqdis pledging allegiance to the Islamic State of Iraq and the Levant (ISIL) forming the Sinai Province. In the wake of the attack on the security forces, the government declared state of emergency, imposing a curfew and establish a buffer zone in the Sinai's border area with Gaza.

==== May ====
===== May 2013 hostage crisis =====
In May 2013, a number of Egyptian Army police officers were taken hostage by armed tribesmen in the Sinai Peninsula, with videos released on the internet with them begging for their lives. As a response, Egypt's government built up security forces in northern Sinai as part of an effort to secure the release of six policemen and a border guard kidnapped by suspected militants. On 20–21 May, Egyptian troops and police, backed by helicopter gunships, conducted a sweep through a number of villages in northern Sinai, along the border with Israel. The officials said the forces came under fire from gunmen in vehicles, triggering the clashes. The clashes left one gunman dead by 21 May. The hostages were released on 22 May after talks between the captors and Bedouins. One suspect in the kidnapping was arrested on 30 May 2013.

==== July ====
===== July 2013 escalation following Morsi ousting =====
After Morsi's ouster on 3 July by Sisi, there was an increase in violence by armed Bedouin and Islamists. Attacks on security forces took place almost daily — leading many to link the militants there to the Muslim Brotherhood, the Islamist group from which Morsi hails.

In response, Egypt launched a major military operation in Sinai against the militants, bringing in two additional battalions.

In the two weeks following 3 July, 39 terrorist attacks occurred in North Sinai. In the resulting clashes between armed groups and security forces, 52 gunmen and civilians and six security personnel died. On 15 July, a bus transporting workers to the army-operated Al-Arish Cement Company was attacked leaving five killed and 15 wounded, the highest civilian casualties. On 16 July, attacks resulted in some of the most intense army engagement, concentrated at Al-Masa'id, Al-Joura, and the Central Security camp at Al-Ahrash.

Security operations have been largely confined to the 40-kilometre area between Al-Arish and Sheikh Zuweid, extending northward toward Rafah along the border with Israel and up to the Karen Abu Salem crossing. Fighting intensified between the gunmen and the joint army-police forces at night. The frequency of attacks varied from two to five in a single day. In addition, targets expanded from fixed security checkpoints to mobile patrols. In most operations, the gunmen used four-wheel drive vehicles and combinations of light and heavy weaponry. However, in three attacks RPG-7 launchers were used, most likely smuggled from Libya. These grenades are capable of penetrating armoured vehicles and are generally fired at the doors.

A bomb was placed at a hotel frequented by security officials on 2 August 2013, though it caused no injuries. A security source told the Egyptian newspaper Al-Masry Al-Youm that a majority of "terrorists" had been arrested as of 3 August 2013. 2 mausoleums were bombed on 4 August 2013, though no injuries resulted.

Twenty-five Egyptian policemen died in an attack in the northern region of Sinai, on 18 August. After militants forced two mini-buses carrying off-duty policemen to stop, ordered the policemen out and forced them to lie on the ground before shooting them. The Egyptian military arrested eleven people, including five Hamas members, three local residents and three foreign nationals, for their alleged involvement in the killings. The person who committed the murders confessed on 1 September 2013.

Military spokesperson Ahmed Ali said that Egyptian security forces operations in Sinai, from 5 July to 23 August, resulted in 78 suspected militants killed, including 32 foreigners; 116 people injured; and 203 people arrested, including 48 foreigners, for their alleged involvement in attacks on security checkpoints in the peninsula. Additionally 343 tunnels on the border with Gaza at Rafah were destroyed. However, the Gaza Strip smuggling tunnels were mostly used by civilians and militants in the Gaza Strip to break the blockade of the Gaza Strip. The groups connected to the Sinai insurgency were mostly opposed by the Hamas government in the Gaza Strip.

==== September ====
On 3 September, fifteen Islamist militants were killed in an attack by military helicopters.

On 7 September, the Egyptian army launched a new operation in the region involving tanks and at least six Apache helicopters. The army jammed communications to thwart militant coordination. The army combed through areas near the Gaza Strip, including locations used by militants suspected in the killing and abduction of Egyptian soldiers over the past year. In the three days of operations, after 7 September, one officer, two soldiers and 29 militants were killed, and 39 militants arrested.

On 11 September, a suicide bomber targeted Egyptian military intelligence headquarters in Rafah, bringing down the structure, at the same time a car bomb had rammed an army checkpoint. In the simultaneous attack at least nine soldiers were killed.

==== December ====
On 24 December 16 were killed and over 134 injured in a huge bomb which hit the Daqahliya Security Directorate in Mansoura, in the worst attack on a government site since the ouster of Morsi in July. Ansar Bait al-Maqdis, a Sinai-based group, claimed responsibility for the attack. The group deemed Egyptian troops infidels because they answer to a "secular government", warning them to desert or face death.

==== 2014 helicopter downing ====
On 26 January, militants shot down an army Mi-17 helicopter in North Sinai, killing all five of its crew members. The weapon the insurgents used was an infrared-homing, surface-to-air missile from the Russian-made Igla family. This was the first time in Egyptian history that an armed nonstate actor dropped a state's military helicopter by a missile. Ansar Bait al-Maqdis claimed responsibility for this attack as well as series of escalating attacks on police and soldiers. Earlier that morning masked men in an SUV attacked a bus carrying soldiers in Sinai, killing at least three and injuring at least 11.

==== February ====
On 3 February, in what was described as the biggest operation in the Egyptian army's ongoing offensive against militants in the Sinai, 30 suspected militants were killed and another 15 injured in a series of airstrikes and another 16 were arrested.

===== 2014 Taba bus bombing =====
On 16 February 2014, a bomb exploded on or under a tour bus of a South Korean church group in the Egyptian city of Taba, which borders the Gulf of Aqaba and Eilat, Israel. The bombing killed 4 people – 3 South Koreans and the Egyptian bus driver – and injured 17 others. According to The New York Times, the bombing could "offer worrying new evidence that militants who have been attacking Egypt's security forces for months were broadening their campaign against civilians."

==== October ====
===== October 2014 Sinai attacks =====
On 24 October 2014, 33 army and police soldiers were killed in two separate attacks in North Sinai. The attack was the largest ever since the start of the war on terror in Sinai. As a result of the attack, president Abdel Fattah el-Sisi declared a state of emergency in the governorate after meeting with the National Defence Council for several hours. The state of emergency was to last for three months and to include a daily curfew from 5 pm to 7 am until further notice.

==== November ====
On 10 November 2014, Ansar Bait al-Maqdis pledged allegiance to the Islamic State of Iraq and the Levant (ISIL) forming the Sinai Province group with a confusingly similar name to two Egyptian regional governments.

On 14 November 2014, ISIL published a video online that included footage of the group carrying out the October 2014 Sinai attacks.

=== 2015 ===
During 2015, the intensity and the scale of insurgent attacks expanded.

==== January ====
On 12 January 2015, Sinai Province kidnapped a police officer while traveling in North Sinai and took him to an unknown location. On the following day on 13 January 2015, Egyptian military spokesperson announced the discovery of the dead body of the officer after launching a search operation. He also said that during the operation 10 militants were killed, while two others were arrested.

On 26 January 2015, Sinai Province published a video online that included the kidnapping and execution of the police officer kidnapped on 12 January.

===== January 2015 Sinai attacks =====
On 29 January 2015, militants from the Sinai Province militant group launched a series of attacks on army and police bases in Arish using car bombs and mortars. The attacks, which occurred in more than six different locations, resulted in 44 confirmed deaths including army personnel and civilians.

====== Security response ======
It was reported that on 6 February 2015 Egyptian security forces attacked the Sinai Province group, killing 47 Islamic militants in Northern Sinai.

==== March ====
On 10 March 2015, a suicide attack on a police barracks using a water tanker was stopped after security forces opened fire on the water tanker causing it to explode before it could get into the barracks. One civilian near the scene was killed and two other civilians alongside 30 policemen were wounded in the blast.

==== April ====
On 2 April 2015, an attack on an army checkpoint resulted in the death of 15 soldiers, 2 civilians and 15 attackers. As a response to the attack, the Egyptian army launched an operation the following day allegedly killing 100 militants.

On 8 April 2015, eleven civilians were killed in Sheikh Zuweid when an unidentified rocket-propelled grenade hit their homes. A roadside bomb killed two officers in the same city.

On 12 April 2015, 6 soldiers were killed when their armoured vehicle was bombed in North Sinai. On the same day, a separate attack on a police station in Arish resulted in the death of 5 policemen and 1 civilian. 40 were also injured, both policemen and civilians. The attack on the station was carried out by a suicide-bomber using a bomb-laden van, on which the police forces opened fire, causing a large explosion which reportedly created a large crater and shattered house windows near the police station. Militant group Ansar Beit Al-Maqdis has claimed responsibility for the attacks.

On 27 April 2015, members from Al-Tarabin tribe in North Sinai launched an attack on Ansar Bayt al-Maqdis positions in Rafah. The attack came after Ansar Bayt al-Maqdis gunmen fatally shot a member of Al-Tarabin tribe in Berth village in southern Rafah, North Sinai, after he refused to take their warning statements ordering them not to deal with the Egyptian military.

==== May ====
On 16 May 2015, three Egyptian judges and their driver were killed, and a fourth judge was severely wounded when gunmen opened fire on their vehicle in North Sinai. The attack came hours after a Cairo court issued a preliminary death sentence against former president Mohamed Morsi and 105 other defendants on a range of charges, including murder.

==== June ====
On 9 June 2015, militants fired rockets at the direction of an airport in Sinai used by the multinational peacekeeping forces. There were no casualties reported. ISIL affiliate Sinai Province claimed responsibility for the attack on several Twitter accounts linked to it.

==== July ====
===== July 2015 Sinai attacks =====
On 1 July 2015, ISIL Sinai Province militants launched one of the largest-scale battles seen in the Sinai Peninsula since the 1973 Yom Kippur War, and the largest attack since the insurgency begun in 2011, on multiple Egyptian army checkpoints in the Sinai Peninsula, killing 21 soldiers and wounding 9. However, unknown Egyptian security and medical officials reported that up to 64 soldiers had been killed in the attacks. The attack also targeted Sheikh Zuweid police station. Reinforcements from the Second Army Zone stationed in Ismailia have been deployed to Sheikh Zuweid, including Apache helicopters and F-16 fighter jets. Militants have reportedly killed several civilians who refused to allow them onto their rooftops to target security forces. An army statement claimed the killing of more than 100 militants from the attacking force. The militant death toll increased in the following days, due to Egyptian military operations in the region, reaching 241 killed.

On 4 July 2015, a shell bomb struck a house in Sheikh Zuweid, killing a woman and her two children, the shell also seriously wounded another woman and a teenage girl. On the same day, a roadside bomb targeting army and police vehicles killed a five-year-old child in Rafah town that borders the Palestinian Gaza Strip. Three other children and a woman were also wounded in the blast.

On 15 July 2015, twenty militants were killed as security forces repelled an attack on a security checkpoint in North Sinai.

On 23 July 2015, an officer and three soldiers were killed and three others were wounded when an improvised roadside bomb hit their armoured vehicle in a village near the town of Rafah.

On 24 July 2015, the Egyptian army said it has killed 12 terrorists and destroyed two warehouses storing explosive materials.

On 31 July 2015, the Egyptian military bombed areas of the North Sinai towns of al-Arish and Sheikh Zuweid, killing 20 suspected militants.

==== August ====
On 1 August 2015, Egyptian army forces surrounded the home of a leading figure of the Sinai-based militant group Ansar Bayt al-Maqdis, in the town of Sheikh Zuweid, before shooting him dead.

==== September ====
On 3 September 2015, four American and two Fijian Multinational Force and Observers troops were wounded in an attack involving two IEDs.

===== Operation Martyr's Right =====
On 8 September 2015, the Egyptian military launched a major operation code-named "The Martyr's Right". The operation is the largest and most comprehensive operation aimed at rooting out and killing terrorists since July's immediate response to militant attacks. The operation targeted sites in Rafah, Arish, and Sheikh Zuweid, all towns in the northern areas of the peninsula. 535 militants were killed in September 2015.

On 13 September 2015, a Fijian soldier attached to the Multinational Force and Observers was wounded by small arms fire.

==== October ====
===== Downing of Russian passenger plane =====
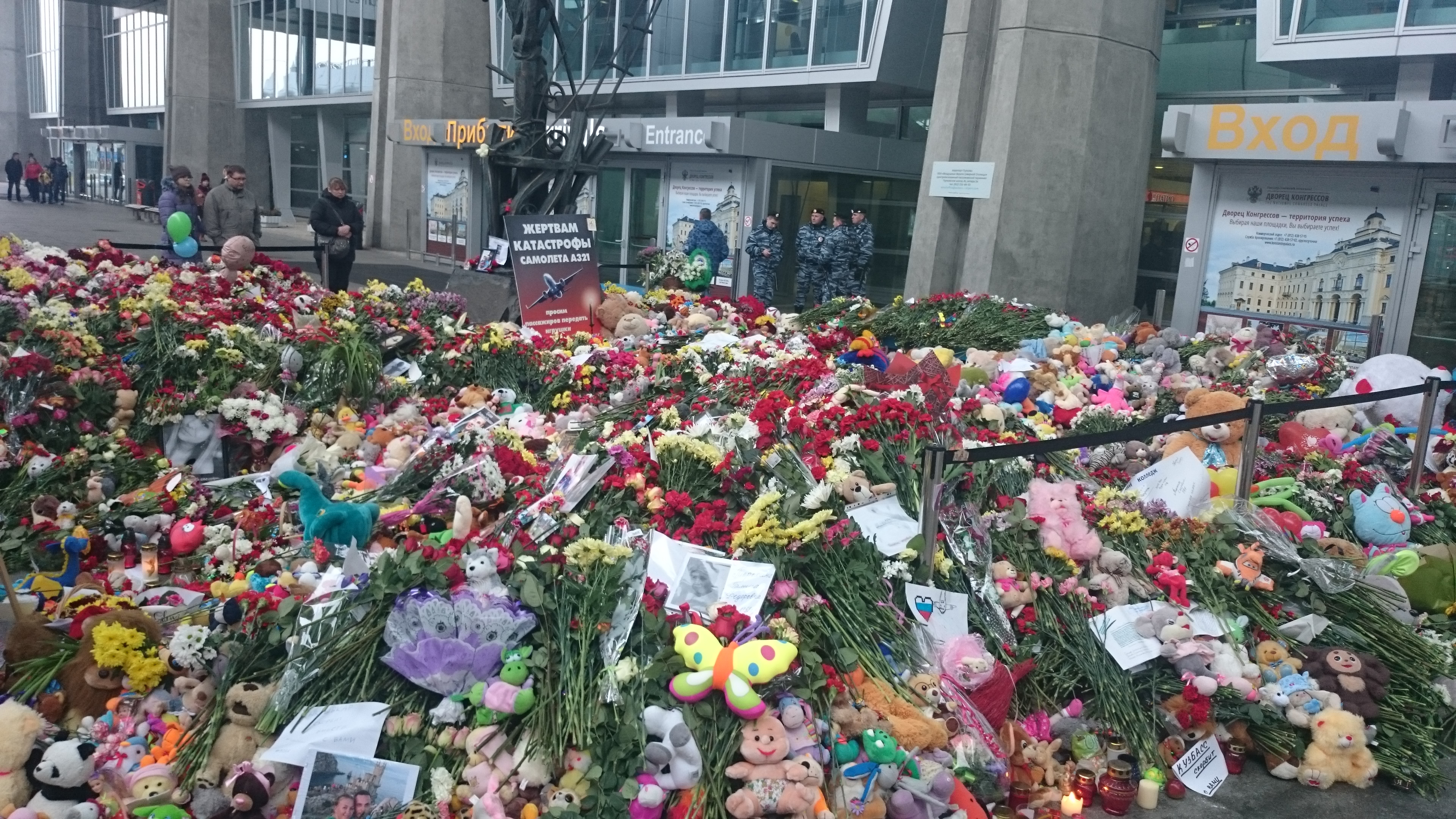
Flowers and children's toys at the Pulkovo Airport entrance. The sign at the back says "To the victims of A321 plane crash".

On 31 October 2015, a Russian passenger jet disintegrated above the northern Sinai, killing all 224 aboard. The Islamic State's Sinai Province claimed responsibility for the incident. Russian, Egyptian, and western investigators concluded that the plane was brought down by a bomb planted at Sharm Al Sheikh Airport. It was the deadliest air disaster both in the history of Russian aviation and within Egyptian territory at the time.

=== 2016 ===
Insurgent attacks increased in early 2016, nearly doubling between the last quarter of 2015 and the second quarter of 2016. However, according to The Times of Israel, the numbers of attacks and casualties was declining by August 2016.

==== March ====
On 19 March, an attack on a checkpoint in Arish killed 13 policemen.

==== April ====
Another attack on 7 April killed 15 soldiers and two civilians.

==== May ====
In May, Egyptian security forces launched an air attack on Jabal Halal, a region with an extensive cave system that was a major insurgent stronghold. According to the Egyptian military, 88 militants were killed and many supply caches were destroyed.

==== June ====
On 28 June, A series of air strikes killed 30 ISIS fighters and injured 50 others.

==== August ====
Then, on 4 August, the army claimed to have killed the leader of Sinai Province, Abu Duaa al-Ansari. Independent sources were unable to verify this claim, or even the existence of al-Ansari. Previous reports had described Abu Osama al-Masri as the leader.

==== October ====
On 14 October a total 12 soldiers and 15 militants were killed. On 17 October several clashes in North Sinai left 3 soldiers and 18 insurgents dead. On 30 October a military operation in North Sinai left 4 soldiers and 6 insurgents dead.

==== November ====
On 5 November Egyptian soldiers killed at least 11 terrorists. On 10 November army soldiers killed at least 6 insurgents.

=== 2017 ===
==== January ====
On 9 January 2017, an attack by several gunmen and a truck bomb on a police checkpoint in El-Arish causing at least 13 deaths and 22 injuries, according to official sources. One of the attackers, drove a stolen rubbish truck loaded with explosive at the security checkpoint, as gunmen opened fire on police forces.

==== April ====
===== Palm Sunday church bombings =====
In February 2017, ISIS produced a video calling for attacks against Christians. In April, ISIS attacked several churches in Egypt known as Palm Sunday church bombings. The attacks killed more than 40 people.

==== July ====
In July, a militant raid on an army checkpoint resulted in the deaths of at least 23 soldiers. The checkpoint was looted for weapons and ammunition before the attackers fled the scene. Later that month an attack targeting police killed 5 officers and wounded 11 in the city of el-Arish. A later roadside bomb south of the city wounded a further 6 officers. The attacks came the same day officials claimed the Egyptian Air Force had killed at least 30 militants in strikes on a gathering.

==== September ====
In September, officers were again attacked in el-Arish, with 18 killed and 7 wounded in an assault involving roadside bombs and small arms fire.

==== November ====
===== Sinai mosque attack =====
On 24 November 2017, the Sufi al-Rawda mosque in the town of Bir al-Abed, North Sinai Governorate, Egypt, was attacked by around forty gunmen during Friday prayers. The gun and bomb attack killed at least 311 people and injured more than 128, making it the deadliest terrorist attack in Egyptian history and the second deadliest attack in 2017, after the 14 October 2017 Mogadishu bombings. Other reports of the attack assert that over 300 deaths occurred.

==== December ====
On 19 December 2017, El Arish International Airport was attacked in an attempt to assassinate the Minister of Interior Magdi Abdel-Ghaffar and the minister of defense Sedki Sobhy. The assassination attempt failed and one officer was killed and two were injured. ISIS used kornet anti-tank missile in the attack. The next day, a new clash started near the airport where five ISIS militants were killed and an army captain was killed.

=== 2018 ===
On 9 February 2018, Col. Tamer el-Refai, the military's spokesman, announced in a statement on state-run television, titled "Communique 1 from the General Command of the Armed Forces", the launching of Comprehensive Operation – Sinai 2018.

On 8 October 2018, Egyptian military declared in an operation they have killed 52 Islamist militants. Three Egyptian soldiers were also killed.

=== 2019 ===
In May 2019, Human Rights Watch reported that throughout the operations in Sinai the "Egyptian military and police have carried out systematic and widespread arbitrary arrests—including of children—enforced disappearances, torture, and extrajudicial killings, collective punishment, and forced evictions", based on interviews with dozens of Sinai residents.

In November 2019, Egyptian forces killed 83 suspected fighters in operations in central and North Sinai.

=== 2020 ===
From 2018 to 2020, 840 militants were killed by Egyptian Security Forces who lost 67 soldiers in return. In March 2020, Egyptian forces managed to kill Abu Fares Al-Ansari, a commander of Ansar Bait al-Maqdis, in Al Ajra' area south of Rafah.

On 1 May 2020, ISIL claimed responsibility via its Amaq News Agency for a bombing that killed and wounded several Egyptian Army personnel near the city of Bir al-Abd in North Sinai Governorate. In retaliation, Egyptian police managed to kill 18 extremist militants in a raid in northern Sinai Peninsula.

On 21 July 2020, ISIS captured five villages in Sinai west of Bir al-Abd.

On 26–28 August 2020, Egypt retook the fives villages and killed 73 ISIS operatives.

=== 2021 ===
On 1 January 2021, a roadside bomb killed two members of Egypt's security forces and wounded five others near Bir al-Abd in the northern Sinai Peninsula.

On 9 February 2021, local sources reported that six fighters of the tribal militias supporting the Egyptian regime had been killed and another fighter had been abducted in central Sinai in an ISIS ambush.

On 22 February 2021, ISIS operatives fired at an Egyptian army patrol south of Sheikh Zuweid, near a roadblock. One soldier was killed and two others were wounded.

On 27 February 2021, IS operatives exploded an IED targeting an Egyptian foot patrol. The explosion killed 3 Egyptian soldiers including a colonel, Ahmad Abdel Mohsen. One other soldier was also wounded.

On 11 March 2021, IS claimed responsibility for killing a father and his son because they were 'collaborating' with Egyptian authorities.

In March 2021, Human Rights Watch accused the Egyptian armed forces of violating international human rights law and committing war crimes by demolishing more than 12,300 residential and commercial buildings and 6,000 hectares of farmland since 2013 in North Sinai.

On 22 March 2021, The Egyptian forces managed to eliminate Saleem Al-Hamadiin, a veteran commander of ISIS, in a joint operation with the local tribes in the village of Al-Barth, south of Rafah.

On 5 April 2021, ISIL released photos showing the execution of an alleged spy, who was apparently working for the Egyptian authorities.

On 17 April, ISIS released footage of them executing a Coptic Christian and 2 other tribal fighters. They issued the execution footage as a 'warning to the Christians of Egypt'. In the same release, they also released videos of sniping and IED attacks and an attack on Egyptian tribal forces, leaving at least 4 tribesmen dead.

On 1 May, ISIS operatives broke into houses in Al-Amal, south of Al-Arish, searching for suspected collaborators with the Egyptian army. Being unable to find them, they executed three of their relatives

On 30 May, Colonel Khaled Al-Arian was killed by an ISIS sniper attack on an Egyptian army patrol in Sheikh Zuweid, in northern Sinai. IS also released photos of them executing two alleged 'collaborators', supposedly working with the Egyptian army.

On 4 June, an Egyptian officer was killed in Sinai: Ahmad Jum'ah, an intelligence officer with the rank of lieutenant colonel, was killed in the detonation of an IED in northern Sinai. The attack was blamed on ISIS.

On 14 June, a group of ISIS militants including a commander were killed during an Egyptian army raid on a farm in Bir al-Abd.

On 31 July, ISIS militants ambushed a group of Egyptian soldiers at their security checkpoint in Sheikh Zuweid, northern Sinai. 5 Egyptian soldiers were killed and 6 more were wounded. 3 ISIS militants were also killed in the shootout.

On 1 August, it was reported that 89 extremists were killed in northern Sinai, compared to eight Egyptian soldiers. Meanwhile, 13 tunnel entrances were destroyed at the borders with the Gaza Strip and Israel.

On 9 August, an ISIS IED was activated south of Rafah against an Egyptian army vehicle killing Mohammad Abd Motagalli, an Egyptian army colonel.

On 12 August, the Egyptian armed forces eliminated 13 terrorists in northern and central Sinai. 9 soldiers were killed and wounded during the exchange of fire.

On 25 August 2 Egyptian soldiers were killed by ISIL snipers whilst conducting operations in northern Sinai.

=== 2022 ===
On 8 May 2022, ten soldiers and one officer are killed during an attack at a checkpoint at a water pumping station in El Qantara,

On 18 November, dozens of IS fighters clashed with the Egyptian army on a government building in Al-Ismailia, which resulted in the killing and wounding of 6 members of the Egyptian army and an airstrike on IS fighters.

On 1 December, IS soldiers killed and wounded 6 members of the Egyptian police in Al-Ismailia governorate.

On 31 December, two gunmen killed and wounded 15 members of the Egyptian police in Al-Ismailia governorate.

=== 2023 ===
On 25 January 2023, Egyptian president Abdel-Fattah Al-Sisi claimed the end of terrorism in the North Sinai governorate.

== Aftermath (2023–present) ==
On 29 January 2023, three children were killed by the explosion of a leftover mine.

On 27 February 2023, unknown gunmen attacked, killed, and wounded three members of the Egyptian army in South Sinai.

On 2 June 2023, a soldier of the Egyptian Central Security Forces crossed over the Egypt–Israel border into Israeli territory, shooting three Israeli soldiers dead and injuring two others, before he was killed in a shootout with the IDF.

On 30 July, one Egyptian police colonel and two police officers were killed in North Sinai.

On 31 July, at least four police officers were killed and 22 injured in clashes inside the police compound in Arish.

On 17 September, seven Egyptian army soldiers, including two majors and a lieutenant colonel, were killed in an IED explosion in Northern Sinai.

On 16 January 2024, around twenty Egyptian armed men stormed into Israel and started clashing with IDF soldiers. According to the Egyptian army, it was an attempt to smuggle drugs, and they foiled it. The IDF said that one IDF soldier was injured.

== Areas of insurgency ==
According to Reuters, as of 2013, Ansar Bait al-Maqdis was in control of about a third of the villages in Sinai. Daily clashes with militants in North Sinai were reported by the army in 2015. The insurgency has not spread to south Sinai, where there are tourist hubs. In the northeastern part of the peninsula, checkpoints have often been established by militants as the army lack the power to stop them. The militants have captured and assassinated policemen there.

== Spillover into mainland Egypt ==
On 24 December 2013, sixteen people were killed and over a hundred people injured in a huge bomb which hit the Daqahliya Security Directorate in Mansoura. Ansar Bait al-Maqdis claimed responsibility for the attack.

On 5 August 2014, 5 policemen were killed in an attack on a police car on Matrouh road by armed militants.

On 28 November 2014, the militant group Sinai Province claimed responsibility for the killing of 2 army personnel in Cairo and Qaliubiya.

On 1 December 2014, Sinai Province claimed responsibility for killing a United States citizen in Egypt's western desert in August 2014.

On 21 December 2014, the Egyptian police raided an Ansar Beit Al-Maqdis cell in the Nile Delta killing 5 members.

On 26 December 2014, two Ansar Bait al-Maqdis militants were killed in a gunfight in El-Salam City, on the eastern outskirts of Cairo. The Ministry of Interior later identified one of the dead militants as the commander of Ansar Beit El-Maqdis in the Nile Delta.

== Gaza Strip spillover ==
With each escalation in the Palestinian enclave, Egyptian authorities are apprehensive about the potential spillover effects onto their territory; the incursion of thousands of Gazans into North Sinai in 2008 in response to the blockade imposed by Israel exemplifies this phenomenon. On top of this, a sprawling network of tunnels between the Gaza Strip and the north of Sinai has been developing since 2006, generating a veritable ‘tunnel economy’. Consequently, the imperative to for the Egyptian authorities to maintain control over the Sinai necessitates finding a ceasefire in the Gaza Strip, whether in the short or long term.

The security-oriented bias of Egyptian authorities towards the Palestinian issue is evident in the context of mediating between the Gaza Strip and Israel, particularly since 2013. From the outset of his tenure, Marshal Al-Sissi has focused on the "reconquest" of the Egyptian peninsula, waging a war against terrorism in which Hamas is involved. While Sinai was often described as 'the backyard of the volatile Gaza Strip, this dynamic is now being reversed'. In 2011, a few months after the overthrow of Mubarak, Hamas is even said to have moved some of its bases and ammunition stockpiles to North Sinai, where 'they would be less vulnerable to Israeli air strikes'. Whether or not these allegations are true, they were repeated and amplified in the Egyptian press during the anti-Morsi campaign in spring 2013. As political developments unfolded in Cairo, Gaza's leaders were no longer simply presented as disruptive elements, using Sinai as a refuge in their fight against Israel, but as real fighters engaged against the Egyptian state, in attacks targeting the security forces. Following a period of intense repression of the Islamist party by the Egyptian military regime, notably through the near-systematic closure of the Rafah border crossing between 2013 and 2017, a modus vivendi was eventually established between the two parties.

Hamas demonstrates cooperation with Egyptian authorities by rigorously controlling the entry and exit points of the Gaza Strip, in exchange for relaxed mobility conditions for Palestinians. This arrangement implies that Egyptian officials negotiate directly with the political and security leadership of Hamas, particularly those based in the Gaza Strip.

In 2015, Hamas had intensified its clandestine military cooperation with the Islamic State's so-called "Sinai Province." This collaboration reached a significant milestone in December with a prolonged secret visit to Gaza by IS Sinai's military chief, Shadi al-Menai. During his visit, al-Menai engaged in discussions with his counterparts in Hamas's military wing, the Izz al-Din al-Qassam Brigades (IDQB). Al-Menai has been one of Egypt's most wanted figures since a failed assassination attempt in May 2014.

From 2013 anwards, IS Sinai had facilitated the movement of weapons from Iran and Libya through the Sinai Peninsula on behalf of Hamas, receiving a substantial share of each shipment in return. Hamas relies on Bedouin guides to evade detection by the Egyptian army and access the few remaining tunnels that have survived Cairo's aggressive flooding and closure campaign. Through this arrangement, IS Sinai has acquired advanced weaponry, including Kornet antitank missiles, which have been used to sink an Egyptian patrol boat off the coast of al-Arish and destroy several tanks and armored carriers stationed in the northeastern sector of the peninsula.

Additionally, Hamas has provided training to some IS Sinai fighters and assisted with the group's media campaign and online postings. Egyptian intelligence agencies, including the General Intelligence Directorate and military intelligence officials, are convinced that Hamas is engaged in a sustained effort to undermine government control over the Sinai, despite publicly seeking a rapprochement with Cairo. This shift in Hamas's strategy occurred after the Muslim Brotherhood was ousted from the Egyptian government in 2013 and Egypt instituted its blockade of Gaza, prompting Hamas to support major terrorist organizations operating in the peninsula.

Out of the approximately 15 main militant groups operating in the Sinai desert, the most dominant and active militant groups formerly had close relations with the Gaza Strip. The Army of Islam, a U.S. designated terrorist organization based in the Gaza Strip, is responsible for training and supplying many militant organizations and jihadist members in Sinai. Mohammed Dormosh, the Army of Islam's leader, was known for his close relationships to the Hamas leadership. According to Ynet, the Army of Islam has been known to smuggle members into the Gaza Strip for training, then returns them to the Sinai Peninsula to engage in terrorist and jihadist activities. Since 2007, Hamas and the Army of Islam have shifted to being adversaries, with the latter now considering Hamas an "apostate" organization.

Probably in an attempt to forge closer ties with the Egyptian government, Hamas began a propaganda campaign to combat extremist ideologies in the Gaza Strip in April 2015. At the time, they denied it was targeted at IS or any other specific group. Mosques in the strip preached to promote a "centrist ideology". The Jerusalem Post speculated that this was in response to the ISIS attack on the Yarmouk, the Palestinian refugee camp in Syria.

In July 2015, ISIS started threatening Hamas.

Israeli Major General Yoav "Polly" Mordechai accused Gaza of helping ISIS by providing medical care to people wounded in the Sinai conflict. Egypt accused Hamas of assisting ISIS in the Sinai, but in public the two groups had a violently hostile relationship (see below).

In 2017, an IS suicide bomber at Rafah Border Crossing killed a Hamas government border guard (Nidal al-Jaafari, 28) and injured several others. Before anyone had claimed responsibility, Hamas described the bomber as an outlaw and "a person of deviant ideology", their terminology for Islamic extremists.

Hamas arrested dozens of Salafi militants in the Gaza Strip.

In 2018, Palestinians from the Gaza Strip who had joined ISIS Sinai Province, captured and killed a man who they claimed was connected to the Qassam Brigades. The killers made a video of the murder and released it as a "declaration of war" against Hamas. The speaker in the video is referred to as Abu Kazem al-Maqdisi.

Then in 2019, another suicide attack – also attributed to ISIS – directly targeted Gaza Strip police. Three police officers were killed, all three victims were allegedly members of Hamas. Gaza's Security forces responded by arresting ten people whom they suspected were members of the cell who arranged the attack.

== Egyptian government's response ==
=== Military tactics ===
The disposition of Egyptian forces in the Sinai peninsula is mandated by the Camp David Accords and it is monitored by the 1,600 foreign troops who make up the Multinational Force and Observers. Egypt is only permitted to station enough military forces to enforce security in the Sinai.

In 2011, Egypt sent an additional 2,500 troops and 250 armored personnel, with helicopters as part of Operation Eagle, a mission to provide security during the transition to power from the then-recently fallen Egyptian President Hosni Mubarak. Operation Eagle was joined by Operation Sinai in 2012, which came in response to a militant attack against an Egyptian border post 5 August that killed 16 border guards. Together, the two operations increased the total troop count by more than 2,500 added 80 vehicles and at least two attack helicopters. Egypt also was allowed to deploy armed fighter jets to El Arish to assist its ground forces in Sinai.

Egypt's expanded force structure in Sinai is designed to deny militants sanctuary by bringing more force to bear than the municipal police can provide. Many of the new forces are stationed in the northeast of the Sinai along the Egyptian border with Gaza. They set up roadblocks and checkpoints in an attempt to monitor traffic and counter smuggling on the Sinai Peninsula.

In the October 2014 attacks, the militants in Sinai used suicide truck bombs to breach army roadblocks and strongpoints for the first time, they immediately followed these attacks by launching an infantry attack.

After the October attacks, the Egyptian military began using armed drones for the first time since the Sinai insurgency began. And as a measure to counter weapon and militant trafficking between Egypt and Gaza strip, the Egyptian government announced the creation of a buffer zone along the Egypt-Gaza border.

Following the attacks on army and police bases in Arish in early 2015, the Egyptian President issued a decree to create a unified military command for the east of the Suez Canal to combat terrorism. Led by General Osama Roshdy Askar, it was to guide counter-terrorism activities of the Second and Third Armies.

On 27 April 2015, Egypt's Prime Minister Ibrahim Mahlab issued a decree ordering the isolation and evacuation of new areas in North Sinai's Rafah city, thus expanding the buffer zone.

A shift in the militants strategy appeared in the July 2015 clashes. Zack Gold, Middle East analyst, views the battle as a change in strategy from hit and run tactics toward an ISIL-like 'holding' of territory.

As an effort to limit car-bombs attacks, Egypt's Prime Minister Ibrahim Mahlab issued a decree banning 4X4 vehicles in army-operations zones in Sinai.

Following the mosque attack in November 2017, President el-Sisi vowed to respond with "the utmost force" and Egyptian authorities in the days immediately after the attack the Air Force claimed to have the pursued and destroyed of some of the militants' vehicles and weapons stocks. Airstrikes were also conducted in the neighboring mountains. In February 2018, the Egyptian military conducted major air strikes and land assaults against terrorist positions in Sinai.

Egyptian forces occupied 37 schools and turned them into military bases. After the government took over the school, it failed to properly relocate the children. Students were denied access to education, and illiteracy levels increased. Besides, clashes between the army and armed groups destroyed 59 schools, three of which were attacked or destroyed by militants.

=== Judicial responses ===
The Egyptian government has used the death penalty to punish those convicted of committing terrorist acts in Sinai. On 26 December 2017, Egypt hanged 15 men convicted of killing nine soldiers during an attack on a military checkpoint in 2013.

== Alleged Israeli involvement ==
In August 2012, an article in the Haaretz newspaper said that the military cooperation between Israel and Egypt to combat jihadists in the region is at its highest level since the 1979 peace accords. A similar information in mentioned in an WSJ article from August 2013, which states: A senior American official described military cooperation between Israel and Egypt as "better than ever,".

One year later, with Cairo's consent, an Israeli drone reportedly entered Egyptian airspace and eliminated a terrorist cell in the Sinai. According to Western officials, the strike conducted by Israel was preceded by communications between senior Israeli security officials and their Egyptian counterparts. This strike has not been officially recognised.

Since Marshal Al-Sissi's ascension to power in Cairo in the summer of 2013, Israeli leaders appear to share numerous strategic interests with their Egyptian counterparts, as evidenced by their close cooperation during the ceasefire negotiations with Hamas following Operation Protective Edge held in the Egyptian capital. The magnitude of the terrorist threat in the region justifies, from Israel's perspective, a tactical alliance with the Egyptian military, which has historically been viewed as an adversary.

According to a New York Times article from May 2018 titled Secret Alliance: Israel Carries Out Airstrikes in Egypt, With Cairo's O.K., Israel also actively assists Egyptian forces with intelligence and airstrikes in the area, while other Western analysts assert that Cairo has granted the IDF "carte blanche" to target Sinai militants with crewed and uncrewed aircraft. This report includes providing critical intelligence and conducting airstrikes, indicating a deep level of operational coordination between the two countries.

However, while this cooperation is aimed at eliminating a common threat, it is also important for Israel to keep the Sinai as a buffer zone, as provided for in the 1978 agreement, in order to maintain the 'qualitative military edge' (QME) over its neighbours.

Extensive smuggling of migrants (mostly from African countries), drugs and contraband from Sinai into Israel, as well as kidnapping of migrants crossing the Sinai en route from Africa to Israel were commonplace in the past, serving as an important source of income for insurgent groups in the Sinai. The crisis in Egypt resulted in a rise in illicit and insurgent activities across the Egypt–Israel border, prompting Israel to construct the Egypt–Israel barrier, completed in 2013. This had the effect of practically eliminating illegal migrant crossing into Israel and significantly reducing cross-border insurgency and drug smuggling.

On 16 October 2017, the Islamic State announced that it had fired rockets at Eshkol region in Israel, in response to 'Jewish aircraft' assisting Egyptian security forces.

On 23 May 2018, the Islamic State released a video claiming that Israeli aircraft struck civilian homes in the Sinai and showed Hebrew labels on munitions purportedly found in aftermath of the attack.

As of 3 February 2018, The New York Times wrote that the Israeli Defence Forces had conducted over 100 air strikes in Sinai, which elicited an official denial from the Egyptian military.

== Reactions ==
=== Israel ===
In the two years following 2011, Israel approved two Egyptian military increases in the Sinai Peninsula above levels set in the Camp David Accords, which mandates that the Sinai must remain demilitarized, with only enough forces in Sinai to enforce security. Israel did so because it is not in its interest to have unrest in Sinai, whether political protests or militant violence.

However, in late 2012, concern began to be raised as Egypt began deploying more force and tanks without coordination from Israel. On 21 August, Israeli Foreign Minister Avigdor Lieberman said that it is important for Israel to make sure that the Egyptian-Israeli peace treaty is upheld, and not to remain silent as Egyptian military forces enter the Sinai. Concern was raised by Israeli officials over Egyptian failure to notify Israel about the deployment of tanks in the Sinai, which violates the peace treaty. Lieberman said, "We must make sure that every detail is upheld, otherwise we'll find ourselves in a slippery slope as far as the peace treaty is concerned."

On the same day, Israeli daily Maariv reported that Israel sent a message to Egypt via the White House, protesting Egypt's ongoing increase in military presence in the Sinai without coordination from Israel, and telling Egypt that it must remove tanks from the Sinai because their presence violates the Egyptian-Israeli peace treaty of 1979, which states that Sinai Peninsula is to remain demilitarized. The Maariv report was echoed by an article in The New York Times, which stated that Israel was "troubled" by the entry of Egyptian tanks into the northern Sinai Peninsula without coordination with Israel and had asked Egypt to withdraw them. Partly due to Egypt's military deploying tanks in the Sinai Peninsula, Israel is increasingly worried about what has long been their most critical regional relationship. The lack of coordination around their deployment is seen as potentially undermining a peace treaty that has been a cornerstone of Israel's security for decades according to The New York Times. Israel is also concerned that Egypt may use Operation Eagle to build up its military presence in the Sinai, and leave the tanks and armored carriers in the Sinai while not doing much more than symbolic action to eliminate the terrorist threat.

Israel has not issued a formal complaint, and instead prefers to resolve the issue through quiet contacts, as well as mediation from the U.S., to avoid straining its relationship with Egypt.

On 24 August 2012, a senior Egyptian military source said that Egyptian Defense Minister Abdel Fattah el-Sissi and Israeli Defense Minister Ehud Barak have reached an agreement on the issue of the militarization of the Sinai. Al Hayat reported that Sissi phoned Barak and said that Egypt was committed to maintaining the peace treaty with Israel. Sissi also said that the militarization was temporary, and was needed for security and to fight terrorism. However, an Israeli defense official denied that such a conversation took place.

In late August 2012, Morsi said that the security operations do not threaten anyone, and "there should not be any kind of international or regional concerns at all from the presence of Egyptian security forces". Morsi added that the campaign was in "full respect to international treaties. The Egyptian-Israeli peace deal places limits on Egyptian military deployment in the Sinai. Officials in Israel were concerned about Egypt building up heavy armour in Sinai."

On 8 September 2012, an Israeli official confirmed that coordination exists between Israel and Egypt regarding Operation Eagle. Egyptian Military spokesman Ahmed Mohammed Ali had earlier announced that Egypt has been consulting with Israel regarding its security measures in the Sinai.

On 2 July 2015, one day after the attacks on 15 Egyptian Army checkpoints, Israel announced that it was giving Egypt a "free hand to operate in northern Sinai against local jihadist groups, voluntarily ignoring an annex to the 1979 Camp David Peace Accords banning the presence of significant Egyptian forces in the area."

Israeli Prime Minister Benjamin Netanyahu sent condolences to Egypt for the terrorist attacks that rocked that country on 1 July. He further stated that "we are together with Egypt and many other states in the Middle East and the world in the struggle against extreme Islamic terrorism."

As of 3 February 2018, The New York Times had claimed that Israel has conducted over 100 air strikes in Sinai, which has been denied by the Egyptian Military spokesman, Col. Tamer a-Rifai.

On 8 November 2021, after a meeting between Egyptian and Israeli military commanders in Sinai, Israel agreed to a larger deployment of Egyptian troops near Rafah. The exact level of the troop increase was not immediately announced.

=== United States ===
According to CNN, in a move to increase security in the Sinai, help Morsi, and reassure Israel, U.S. Defense Secretary Leon Panetta offered Egypt classified intelligence-sharing capabilities to help Egypt identify military threats in the area, which he discussed during his recent trips to Egypt and Israel. The technology has been widely used in Iraq and Afghanistan to identify vehicles at great distances. The technology may also be used by the Multinational Force and Observers in Sinai. The United States is also offering increased intelligence sharing, including satellite imagery and drone flights, as well as cellphone intercepts and other communications among militants suspected of plotting attacks.

On 22 August 2012, the State Department urged Egypt to be transparent over Operation Eagle and any security operations in the Sinai. The State Department said that the United States supports Operation Eagle against terrorism, but stressed that Egypt must continue coordination with Israel regarding these operations and military increases in the Sinai, according to the 1979 Camp David Accords. The State Department also called on Egypt to fulfill its obligations under the 1979 Egyptian-Israeli peace treaty and deal strongly with security threats in the Sinai, while ensuring that "lines of communication stay open."

On 23 August 2012, Secretary of State Hillary Clinton, speaking with Egyptian Foreign Minister Mohamed Kamel Amr, urged Amr to maintain lines of communication with Israel, and emphasized the importance of being transparent over the militarization of the Sinai.

=== Multinational Force and Observers in Sinai ===
The Multinational Force and Observers in Sinai, a 1,650-strong international organization created in 1979 during the Camp David Accords with peacekeeping responsibilities, kept a low profile during the intensification of Operation Eagle in 2012. A representative for the organization said that "we are unable to respond to queries from the media at this time" in response to whether Egypt asked permission to move weaponry into the Sinai, and whether Israel granted it.

=== Jordan ===
The Egyptian pipeline carrying natural gas to Jordan has been attacked at least 15 times since the start of the uprising in early 2011. The lack of Egyptian gas hit Jordan budget severely (by JOD 1.4 billion or the equivalent of US$2 billion yearly for the past two years) and they are looking for Egypt to compensate for the lost quantities.

=== Other ===
A Mada Masr journalist questioned the accuracy of Interior Ministry reports on at least two accusations. CBS journalist Clarissa Ward went undercover into the Sinai and witnessed evidence of a scorched earth policy.

== See also ==
- Arab Spring
- Arab Winter
- Timeline of the Sinai insurgency
- Salafi-jihadist insurgency in the Gaza Strip
- Gaza–Israel conflict
- List of modern conflicts in the Middle East
- List of wars and battles involving the Islamic State
- Insurgency in the Maghreb (2002–present)
- Islamist insurgency in the Sahel
- Insurgency in Cabo Delgado
- Boko Haram (or ISWAP) insurgency
