= Rapid Deployment Forces (Egypt) =

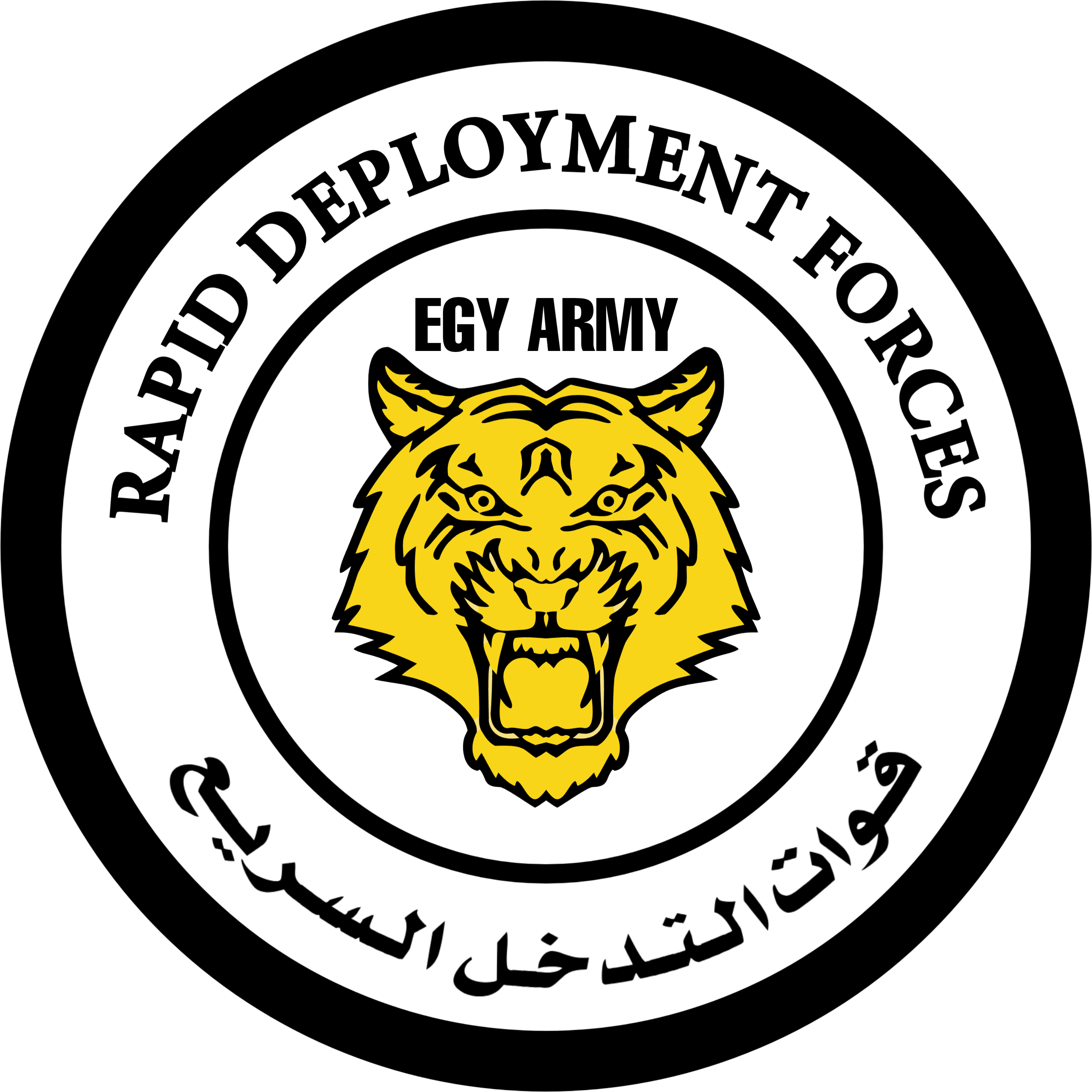
- Active: 2014–present
- Country: Egypt
- Allegiance: Special Forces
- Branch: Egyptian Ground Forces
- Type: Ground forces
- Role: Ground war and air war
- Size: Unknown
- Garrison/HQ: Unknown
- Engagements: Sinai Insurgency

Commanders
- Current commander: General Mohamed Ahmed Zaki

The Rapid Deployment Forces (RDF) are one of the branches of the Egyptian Armed Forces. It was formed in March 2014 by the former defense minister field marshal Abdel Fattah al-Sisi. It was formed due to the increasing threat of terrorist organizations in Libya. It is mainly airborne troops with a special formation, and it is characterized by the ability to perform operations inside and outside the Egyptian mainland.

The forces comprises the most efficient elements of the Sa'ka Forces, mechanized infantry, armored corps, air defense, artillery and anti-tank teams, it also includes military police, special reconnaissance teams, and a number of fighter jets.

== History ==
The Egyptian Rapid Deployment Forces were formed in 2014. Its first deployment was in Sinai after the October 2014 attacks.
