= July 2015 Sinai clashes =

Battle in Egypt

- Part of Sinai insurgency
| Date | 1–2 July 2015 (1 day) |
| Location | North Sinai |
| Result | Egyptian victory |

Belligerents
| Egypt; Egyptian Army; Egyptian Ministry of the Interior; Central Security Forces | Islamic State of Iraq and the Levant: Wilayat Sinai (formerly known as Ansar Bait al-Maqdis) |

Strength
| Unknown | 300+ |

Casualties and losses
| 21 soldiers killed (official army and health ministry statement); Other sources: 64 soldiers killed | 100+ militants killed. In subsequent operations+241 killed |

The city of Sheikh Zuweid in Sinai.

On 1 July 2015, the IS-affiliated Sinai Province militant group launched the largest scale battle the Sinai Peninsula has seen since the 1973 Yom Kippur War, killing 21 soldiers in the numerous attacks which targeted multiple Egyptian army checkpoints and the Sheikh Zuweid police station in the Sinai Peninsula. More than 100 militants were reportedly killed by the army during the battle.

== Attacks ==
The attacks started at 6:50 am on that day, with the militants attacking Sheikh Zuweid's police station, and several newly established army checkpoints. The attacks were reportedly carried out by more than 300 militants and targeted 15 different security and army positions. Militants used car bombs to attack five military road checkpoints, and were armed with heavy weapons and anti-aircraft weaponry. Militants also planted IEDs on local highways to ambush military response forces.

=== Sheikh Zuweid Police Station ===
The fighting for the police station raged for hours as militants laid a siege around the station and tried to breach it. Security sources said that the militants planted bombs and land mines around it to prevent forces from leaving the station and planted bombs along the road between Sheikh Zuweid and al-Zuhour army camp to prevent the movement of army supplies or reinforcements. In spite of the heavy attack on the police station, the militants failed to breach it and the siege was ended with the help of air strikes conducted by Apache helicopters and F-16 jet fighters.

== Security Response ==
In the army's counterattack, the Egyptian Air Force bombed multiple militant positions, and reinforcements from the Second Army Zone stationed in Ismailia, were deployed to Sheikh Zuweid. Air strikes continued to the next day killing 22 militants. The Egyptian military also intensified its offensive in the region destroying multiple militants headquarters and killing hundreds of the militants.

== Casualties ==
The attack left 21 army soldiers dead, including 4 officers, and 9 wounded. An army statement claimed the killing of more than 100 militants from the attacking force and the destruction of 20 of their vehicles. However, unknown Egyptian security and medical officials reported that up to 64 soldiers had been killed in the attacks. The militant death toll increased in the following days, due to Egyptian military operations in the region, reaching 241 killed.

== Responsibility ==
Wilayah Sinai, the Sinai branch of ISIL, claimed responsibility for the attacks in a statement on a Twitter account. The group also published pictures showing the attacks.

== Analysis ==
Officials claimed that the militants sought to take over the city of Sheikh Zuweid. In addition, the ISIS-affiliated group tried to cut off Egyptian Rafah from al-Arish, but the Egyptian army said it was able to foil their attempt and gain full control of the area. Zack Gold, Middle East analyst, views the battle as a change in strategy from hit and run tactics toward an ISIS-like 'holding' of territory. The Egyptian army accused TV channels, including Qatar's Al Jazeera TV, of aiding the militants and spreading rumors to demoralize Egyptians.

== See also ==
- List of terrorist incidents, 2015
- January 2015 Sinai attacks
- October 2014 Sinai attacks
- Sinai Insurgency
