= Jund al-Islam =

Sinai Jihadist group

Jund al-Islam Soldiers of Islam
- جند الإسلام
- Logo of Jund al-Islam Flag of Jund al-Islam
- Dates active: February 2011-July 2020
- Allegiance: Al-Qaeda
- Active regions: Libya; Egypt; Gaza Strip
- Ideology: Salafism Qutbism; Salafi Jihadism Wahabism
- Part of: Ansar Bait al-Maqdis (September 2011-2014)
- Wars: the Insurgency in Egypt (2013–present)

Jund al-Islam was an active armed insurgent group affiliated with al-Qaeda operating primarily in Egypt's Sinai Peninsula.

== Background ==
The group was established in 2011 shortly after the fall of the Libyan government led by Muammar Gaddafi and established training camps in Libya as well, and formally publicized itself in September 2013 after claiming a suicide attack against the Egyptian militaries' intelligence headquarters in Rafah. The group later went largely inactive until 2017, by threatening to fight the Islamic State of Iraq and the Levant and its local Sinai affiliate. The group also claims to have links to Al-Qaeda in the Arabian Peninsula, the group also has links to Hamas in the Gaza Strip through a Gaza-based Islamic cleric who also has ties to the Syria-based Hayat Tahrir al-Sham, which is a coalition of 5 Syrian rebel groups including Jabhat Fateh al-Sham which is the successor organization to Jabhat al-Nusra that until 2016 was al-Qaeda's official branch in Syria, and has supported and maintained relations with Jund al-Islam through the Gaza cleric who acts as an intermediary between the two.

=== al-Qaeda affiliation ===
Though the group claims to be part of al-Qaeda and has expressed open support for it and its leader Ayman al-Zawahiri and has organizational links with its former Syrian affiliate HTS and claims to have links with its branch in Yemen, al-Qaeda has not acknowledged the group, neither recognizing it as an affiliate or support for it.

== History ==
The group was established in February 2011 and conducted its first action as a group in May 2011 after the death of Osama bin Laden by showing off its military capabilities, and remained inactive from then until 2013.

On September 9, 2013, the group claimed responsibility for a major double suicide attack against an Egyptian military intelligence compound in northern Sinai in the city of Rafah, resulting in the death of 6 soldiers and seventeen injuries months after the fall of Egypt's former president Mohamed Morsi in July 2013. In a statement regarding the attack Ansar Beit al-Maqdis praised the attack and claimed it was in response for Egyptian crackdowns against Islamists following the fall of Morsi and cooperation with Israel. Jund al-Islam likewise released a statement with similar rhetoric. On January 2, 2014, gunmen shot dead Mark De Salis and Lynn Howie as they ate lunch on a beach in near Sabratah, Zawiya district, Libya. Jund Al-Islam claimed responsibility for the attack, claiming that the couple was targeted for being foreign spies.

In November 2017 the group reemerged again, declaring its opposition to the Islamic State and its leader Abu Bakr al-Baghdadi. Jund al-Islam claims that Abu Bakr al-Baghdadi and IS are "Kharijites", and also claims that IS's Sinai branch has committed abuses against the local Muslim population and besieged the Gaza Strip.

In January 2018, Jund al islam claimed that "a Russian foreign fighter part of ISIL's Sinai province defected to Jund al-Islam after several disagreements with IS's leadership in Sinai, and was featured in a video released by Jund al-Islam criticizing IS".

Islamic State's Wilayat Sinai claimed to have "exterminated" the remnants of Jund al-Islam in July 2020, after an encounter in which seven members of the group including their leader 'Abu Ayyub' were killed in the village of al-Burath.
