= USS Monterey (CG-61) =

Ticonderoga-class cruiser

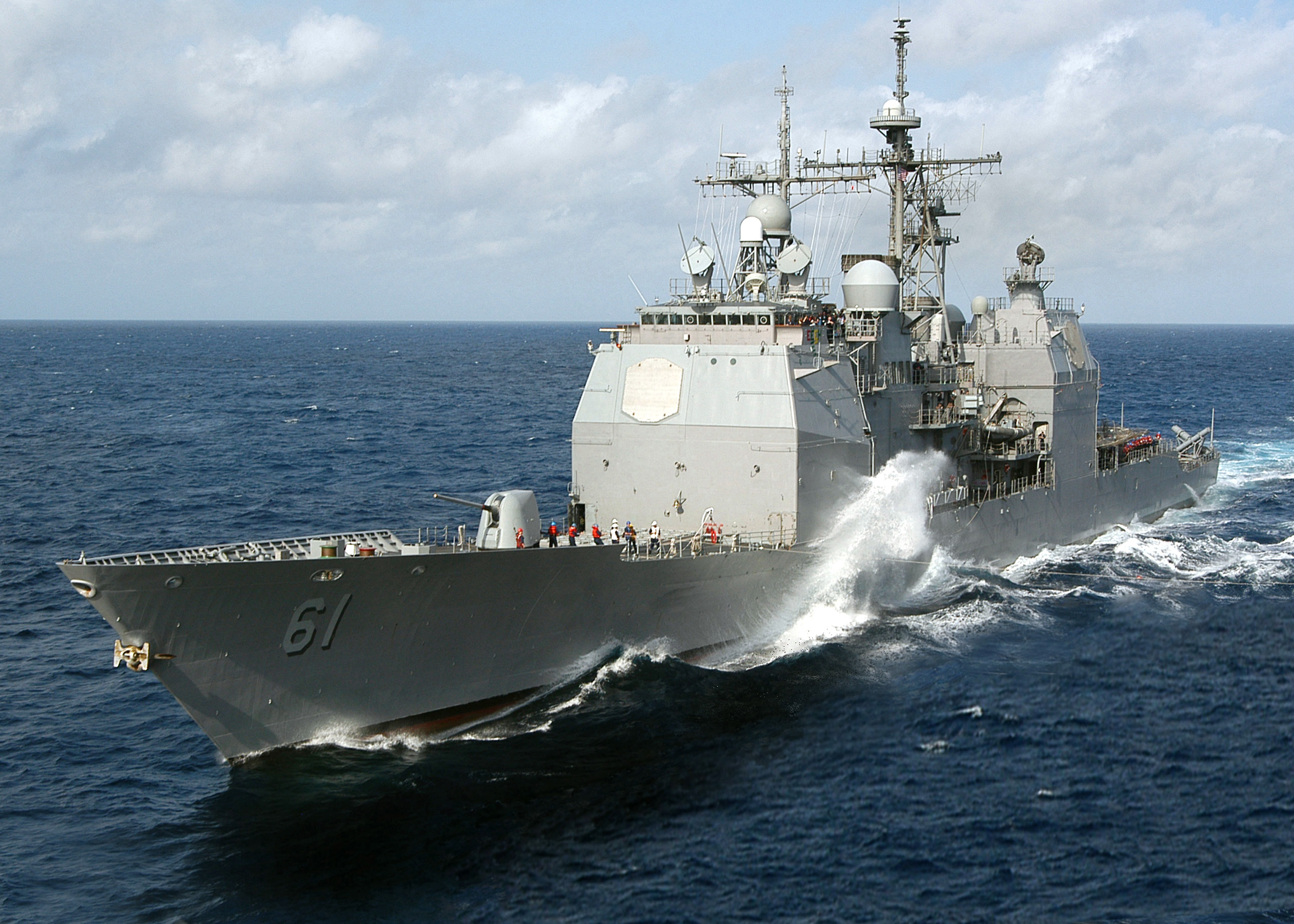
- USS Monterey on 20 April 2006

History

United States
- Name: Monterey
- Namesake: Battle of Monterrey
- Ordered: 26 November 1984
- Builder: Bath Iron Works
- Laid down: 19 August 1987
- Launched: 23 October 1988
- Commissioned: 16 June 1990
- Decommissioned: 16 September 2022
- Identification: Call sign: NRAR; Hull number: CG-61
- Motto: Rough in Battle and Ready in Peace
- Status: out of service
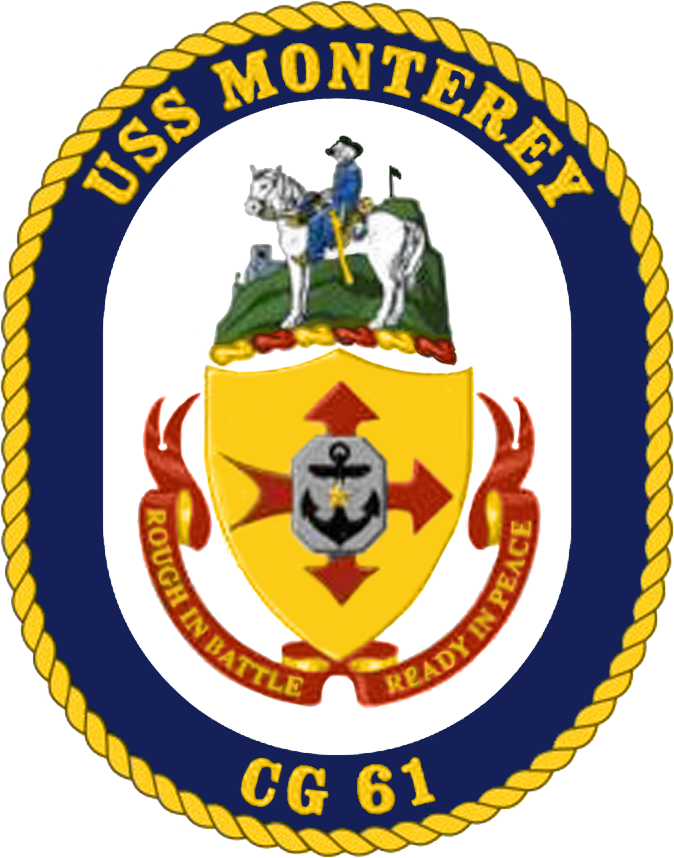
- Badge

General characteristics
- Class & type: Ticonderoga class guided missile cruiser
- Displacement: Approx. 9,600 long tons (9,800 t) full load
- Length: 567 feet (173 m)
- Beam: 55 feet (16.8 meters)
- Draft: 34 feet (10.2 meters)
- Propulsion: 4 × General Electric LM2500 gas turbine engines; 2 × controllable-reversible pitch propellers; 2 × rudders
- Speed: 32.5 knots (60 km/h; 37.4 mph)
- Complement: 30 officers and 300 enlisted
- Sensors & processing systems: AN/SPY-1A/B multi-function radar; AN/SPS-49 air search radar (Removed on some ships); AN/SPG-62 fire control radar; AN/SPS-73 surface search radar; AN/SPQ-9 gun fire control radar; AN/SQQ-89(V)1/3 - A(V)15 Sonar suite, consisting of: AN/SQS-53B/C/D active sonar; AN/SQR-19 TACTAS, AN/SQR-19B ITASS, & MFTA passive sonar; AN/SQQ-28 light airborne multi-purpose system
- Armament: 2 × 61 cell Mk 41 vertical launch systems containing; 122 × mix of: RIM-66M-5 Standard SM-2MR Block IIIB; RIM-156A SM-2ER Block IV; RIM-161 SM-3; RIM-162A ESSM; RIM-174A Standard ERAM; BGM-109 Tomahawk; RUM-139A VL-ASROC; 8 × RGM-84 Harpoon missiles; 2 × 5 in (127 mm)/62 caliber Mark 45 Mod 4 lightweight gun; 2 × Mk 38 25 mm Machine Gun Systems; 2–4 × .50 in (12.7 mm) cal. machine gun; 2 × Phalanx CIWS Block 1B; 2 × Mk 32 12.75 in (324 mm) triple torpedo tubes
- Aircraft carried: 2 × MH-60R Seahawk LAMPS Mk III helicopters.

USS Monterey (CG-61) is a Ticonderoga-class guided-missile cruiser that served in the United States Navy. She is the fourth US Navy vessel named for the Battle of Monterrey at Monterrey, Nuevo León during the Mexican–American War in 1846. She was built at Bath Iron Works in Maine. The ship was decommissioned on 16 September 2022.

== Selected service history episodes ==
=== 1992–1993 ===
In 1992 and 1993, Monterey was part of Carrier Group 6, whose flagship at the time was aircraft carrier USS America (CV-66). On 10–11 January, Monterey was underway from Souda Bay, Crete, to Haifa, Israel. From 12 to 19 January, she was in port in Haifa. From 20 to 22 January, she was underway from Haifa, Israel for exercise Noble Dina Seven. On 22–23 January, she was in port in Haifa, Israel for post-exercise debriefs, before leaving for a US Navy/NATO Combined Air Defense Exercise. On 29 March, Vice Admiral W. A. Owens, Commander, United States Sixth Fleet, embarked with a 28-man Army, Navy, and Air Force Staff including Brigadier General James Mathers (Commanding General, Operation Provide Comfort) at Haifa for the first Joint Task Force Operation at sea in the European Theater, Exercise Juniper Falconry II. From 1–7 April, Monterey was underway for Juniper Falconry II, with a two-day port visit in Haifa on 3–4 April. From 7–9 April, she visited Haifa again for exercise debriefs and to disembark the Joint Task Force.

From 24 to 26 April 1993, Monterey participated in ASW Proficiency Training as a part of COMPTUEX, the first major exercise the America Joint Task Group (JTG) in preparation for MED 3–93. COMPTUEX lasted from 21 April to 14 May and tested the America JTG in coordinated warfare operations. The exercise was a success and the JTG was certified "ready" for more advanced training. In May and June, Monterey conducted port visits to Nassau, Bahamas and Roosevelt Roads, Puerto Rico. Monterey visited Nassau from 9–12 May as a wrap-up to COMPTUEX and NSRR from 31 May to 3 June prior to a missile exercise with the German Navy.

September 1993 was the first time that Monterey served as the Adriatic Cruiser in support of United Nations Resolutions in Operations Sharp Guard, Deny Flight, and Provide Promise. After a stint as the Adriatic Cruiser from 6–13 September, she departed for İzmir, Turkey. After a training anchorage in Izmir from 16 to 22 September, Monterey prepared for Exercise Dynamic Guard, hosted by the Turkish Navy. From 22 September to 4 October, she participated in amphibious, anti-air, anti-surface, anti-subsurface, and mine warfare events. She served as the Eagle Control ship for the entire exercise, monitoring the airspace above the Aegean Sea for possible territorial airspace violations.

Upon completion of Dynamic Guard, Monterey departed for the Adriatic Sea for carrier escort duty with America from 6–13 October. While operating in the Adriatic, she participated in numerous Anti-Submarine Warfare exercises with various NATO/WEU ships and aircraft operating in support of United Nations' resolutions. After detaching from America, Monterey conducted a brief stop in Augusta Bay while en route to Haifa, Israel, where she conducted a port visit from 17 to 28 October.

From 30 October to 5 November, Monterey participated in SHAREM 106 in the Adriatic Sea. Upon completion of the exercise, she departed for Volos, Greece. She then conducted a training anchorage from 7–8 November in Volos, Greece in preparation for Exercise Niriis. From 8–13 November, she participated in Exercise Niriis which was hosted by the Greek Navy. She served as the Support Operations Coordinating Authority with submarine USS Alexandria (SSN-757) during Niriis. Upon completion, Monterey departed for the Adriatic Sea.

In the Adriatic, Monterey operated with NATO/WEU forces in support of United Nations' resolutions. After serving as the Adriatic Cruiser from 15 to 20 November, she departed for Civitavecchia, Italy, the port city of Rome. The crew spent Thanksgiving in Civitavecchia.

From 1–16 December 1993, Monterey served as the Adriatic Cruiser. During this period, she hosted the Engineering Training Group from Staten Island, New York, in preparation for the next year's Operational Propulsion Plant Examination. SECNAV and CINCUSNAVEUR visited from 11 to 12 December and were very impressed with the ship and the crew. In addition, the Commanders of the NATO/WEU ships in the Southern Adriatic, Capt. Bolongaro of the Italian Navy and Commodore Maddison of the Royal Canadian Navy visited Monterey on 2 and 15 December respectively. After completing the ship's duties as Adriatic Cruiser, she departed for Toulon, France.

Monterey arrived in Toulon on 20 December and remained there throughout the Christmas and New Years holidays. While in port, the ship underwent voyage repairs. Many crewmembers took leave and vacationed nearby with their partners. The rest of the crew were given tours and dinners by French families through the Adopt-A-Sailor program.

=== 1998 ===
During Carrier Group Seven's deployment in 1998, Helicopter Antisubmarine Squadron Light 42 (HSL-42), Detachment 2 deployed two SH-60B Seahawk on board the Monterey.

=== 2000 ===
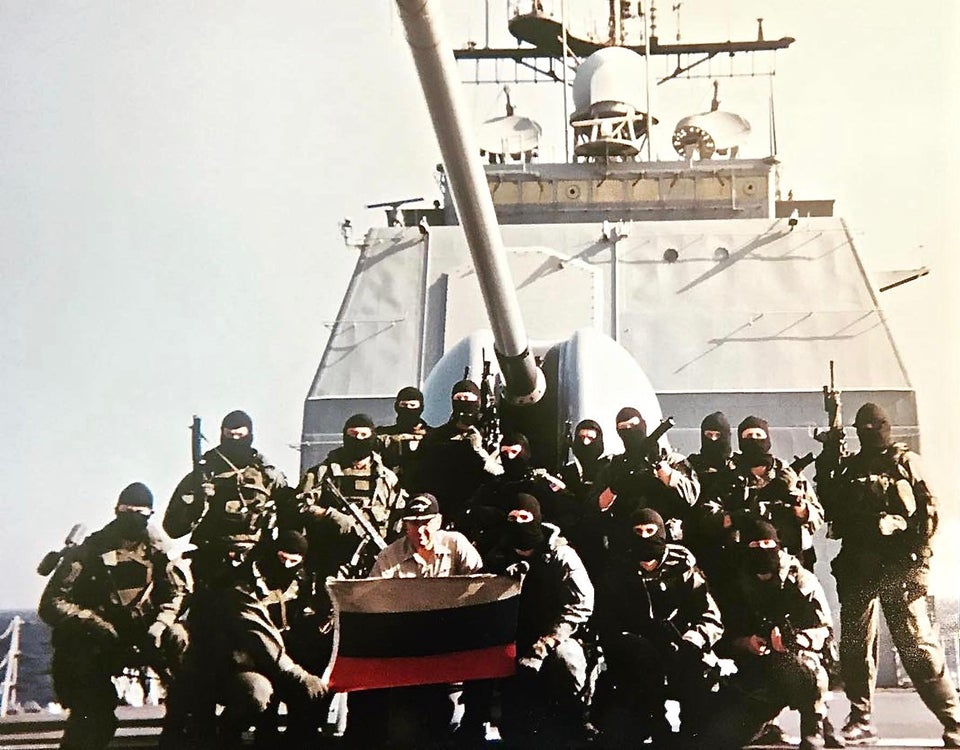
SEAL Team Two members on Monterey after the boarding of Volga-Neft-147

On 2 February 2000, Monterey stopped Russian tanker Volga-Neft-147. The tanker was suspected of smuggling Iraqi oil in violation of UN sanctions, as it had left the Iraqi port of Shatt al-Arab. The boarding operation was conducted by SEAL Team Two and no shots were fired as the tanker crew was cooperative. The tanker was subsequently diverted into Oman where she was confirmed to be carrying Iraqi oil illegally. After the illegal cargo was unloaded, the crew and tanker were free to leave.

=== 2003 ===
In March 2003, the ship was assigned to Carrier Group 6.

=== 2009 ===
On 4 March 2009, Monterey assisted in the first German Navy arrest of pirates (9 in all) off the coast of the Horn of Africa. Monterey dispatched helicopters in the attack of an Antiguan ship, MV Courier.

=== 2011 ===
In March 2011, Monterey was sent to the Mediterranean as the first part of the planned European anti-ballistic missile defense shield. In June 2011, Monterey arrived in the Black Sea to participate in multinational military Exercise Sea Breeze 2011, cosponsored by the US and Ukraine, whose theme is antipiracy operations, leading to protests from Russia.

=== 2017 ===
In October 2017, Monterey was sent on an unscheduled deployment to the 5th fleet.

=== 2018 ===
On 14 April 2018, Monterey launched thirty Tomahawk missiles from a position in the Red Sea as part of a bombing campaign in retaliation for the Syrian government's alleged use of chemical weapons against people in Douma.

=== 2020 ===
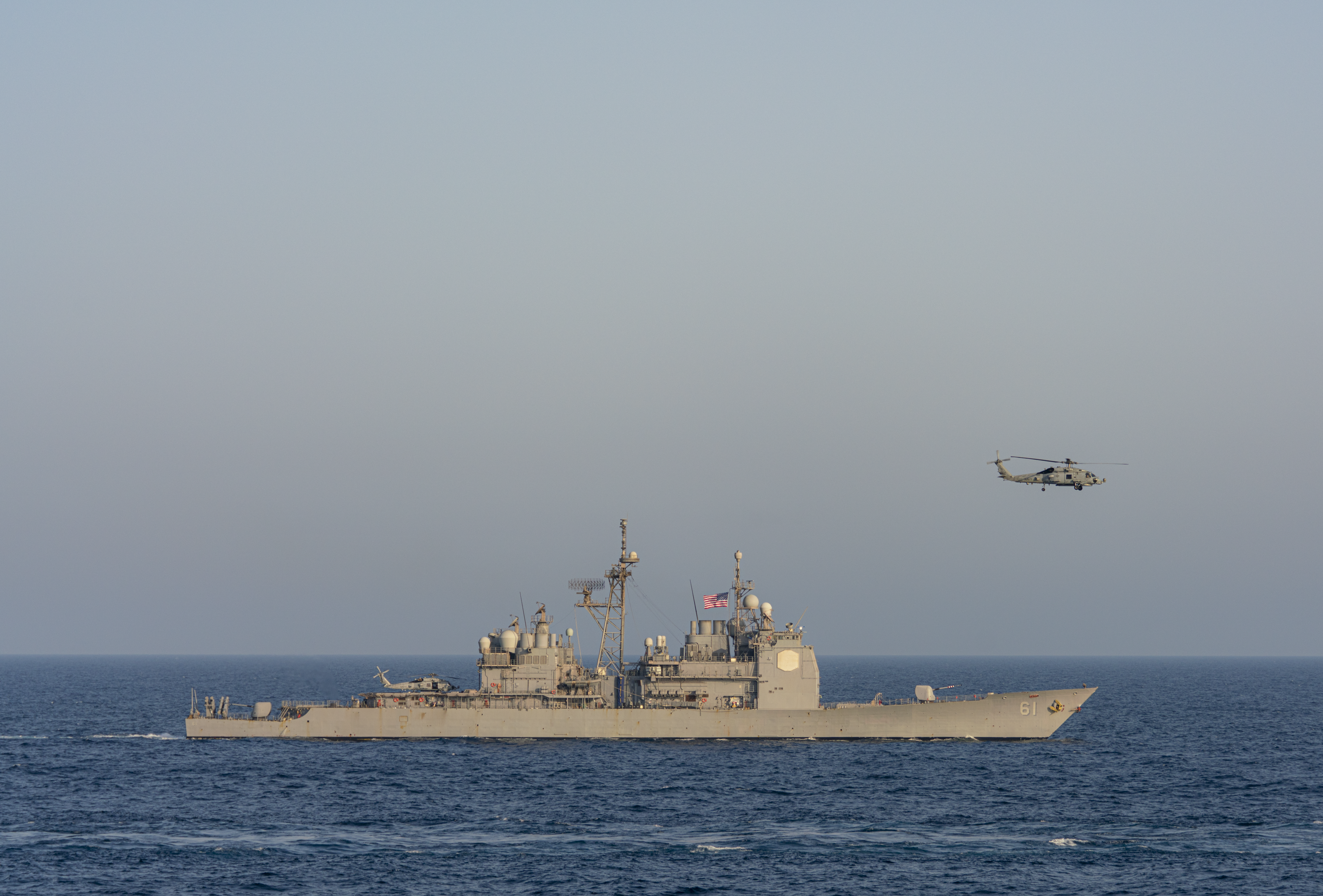
USS Monterey during a 2021 PhotoX event with the Eisenhower Carrier Strike Group (out of frame)

In December 2020 the US Navy's Report to Congress on the Annual Long-Range Plan for Construction of Naval Vessels stated that the ship was planned to be placed Out of Commission in Reserve in 2022.

=== 2021 ===
In May 2021, Monterey intercepted a stateless dhow in the North Arabian Sea and seized an illegal shipment of thousands of small arms, including Type 56 rifles, PKM machine guns, Russian-made anti-tank guided missiles, rocket-propelled grenades, and sniper rifles.

On 13 August 2021 the Monterey visited the Berenice Naval Base in Egypt as part of US-Egyptian military maritime cooperation and hosted Admiral Ahmed Khaled Hassan Saeed.

=== 2022 ===
On 16 September 2022, Monterey was decommissioned during a ceremony at Naval Station Norfolk.

== Awards ==
- Navy Unit Commendation – (Aug 1995-Feb 1996, Sep 2008-Apr 2009)
- Navy Meritorious Unit Commendation – (Dec 1991-Jun 1992, Jan 1999-Sep 2001, Jan 2006-Oct 2007)
- Battle "E" – (1993, 1995, 1997, 1999, 2001, 2006, 2007, 2018)
- CNO Afloat Safety Award (LANTFLT) - (2008)
- Secretary of the Navy (SECNAV) Energy Conservation Award (Large ship category) – (2016)
- Arizona Memorial Trophy – (2017–2018)
- Battenberg Cup – (2018)

== Coat of arms ==
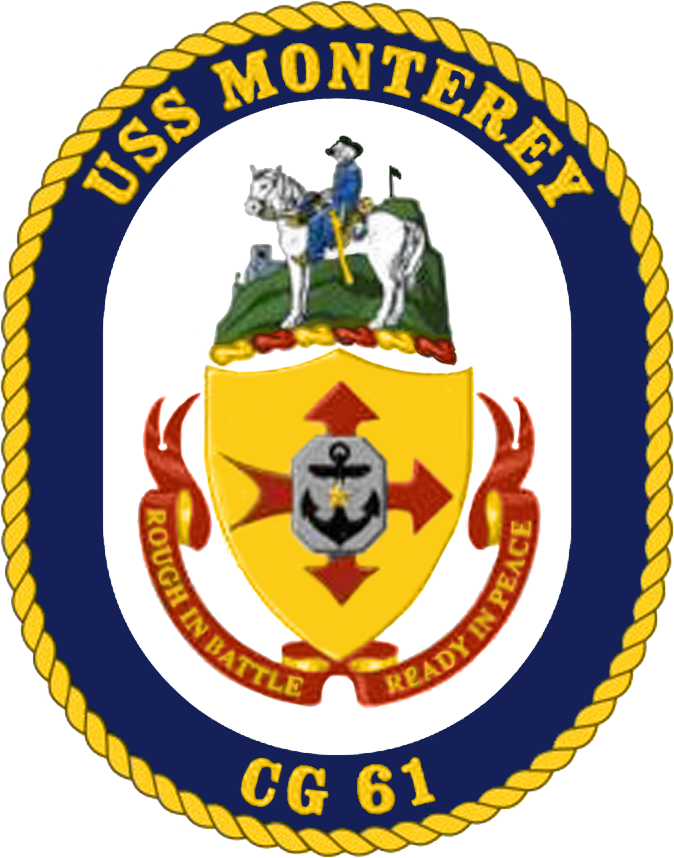

=== Shield ===
The central shield represents AEGIS. the impenetrable defensive shield of the Greek god "Zeus." Over this appears the Surface Warfare Logo, symbolizing the three dimensional (Air, Surface, and Subsurface) threat. The AEGIS elongated octagon covers this symbol. This octagon is familiar to all who view the modern warship's sophisticated radar array. Centered on the octagon, a dark blue anchor characterizing seapower, strength, and Navy tradition. The gold star depicts battle stars earned by the aircraft carrier previously named Monterey. The principal colors, red and gold, establish bravery and excellence as traits honored aboard CG-61.

=== Crest ===
Pictured is General Zachary Taylor in his typical battle pose, leg slung over the saddle atop his famous white stallion "Old Whitie," before the heavily defended Independence Hill, the turning point in the Battle of Monterey. In the background, Black Fort, another massive stone work protecting the city.

=== Motto ===
The motto "Rough in battle and ready in peace" comes from the nickname of Zachary Taylor, "Old Rough and Ready," which he earned in battle against the Seminoles in Florida, and later used as a campaign slogan for his election to the office of President of the United States.

=== Seal ===
The coat of arms is emblazoned upon a white oval enclosed by a blue collar edged on the outside with gold rope and inscribed with the words USS MONTEREY above and CG61 below in gold letters.

== See also ==
- Carrier Strike Group Two
