= October 2014 Sinai attacks =

2014 terrorist incident in Sinai Peninsula, Egypt

Coordinates: 31°6′12″N 33°50′56″E

- Part of the Sinai insurgency
Date	24 October 2014
Location	Sheikh Zuweid and Al-Arish, Sinai Peninsula, Egypt
Result	State of emergency declared in the North Sinai Governorate.: Rafah Border Crossing closed indefinitely.; Rapid Deployment Forces deployed to the region.; Buffer zone to be established along the border with Gaza.

Belligerents
Egypt: Egyptian Army	Islamic State of Iraq and the Levant (Ansar Bait al-Maqdis)

Units involved
	Wilayah Sinai (Ansar Bait al-Maqdis)

Casualties and losses
33 soldiers killed 1 M60 destroyed 1 M113 destroyed	Unknown

Location on the Sinai Peninsula of the two cities attacked on 24 October 2014 by ISIL.

On 24 October 2014, militant group Ansar Beit al-Maqdis ISIL launched two attacks on Egyptian Armed Forces positions in the Sinai Peninsula, killing at least 33 security personnel in one of the deadliest assaults on the Egyptian military in decades.

The first attack in Sheikh Zuweid near Karm Al-Qawades checkpoint killed at least 30 soldiers, while the second one (which took place three hours later near Al-Arish) killed three soldiers. The incidents prompted Egypt's president Abdel Fattah el-Sisi to call for a security meeting, during which a three-month state of emergency and curfew were announced. In addition, the Rafah border crossing with Gaza was closed, a buffer zone between Gaza and Egypt was initiated, a Hamas delegation was refused entry into Egypt, and peace talks between Israel and Gaza were postponed.

== Attacks ==
At approximately 2 p.m. on 24 October 2014, a car bomb targeting two armored vehicles exploded at a heavily guarded military checkpoint in the al-Kharouba area northwest of Al-Arish near the Gaza Strip, killing at least 18 soldiers. The high death toll was due to the vehicles being loaded with ammunition and heavy weaponry. When more officers were deployed to the bomb site, gunmen rushed in, some of them on vehicles, and launched an attack using rocket-propelled grenades and other heavy weaponry, killing at least ten soldiers.

Several hours later, militants opened fire at a checkpoint in Al-Arish, killing three additional members of the Egyptian security forces.

== Responsibility ==
On 14 November, militant group Ansar Beit al-Maqdis, which pledged to the Islamic State of Iraq and the Levant as its Wilayat Sinai published a video claiming responsibility and showing the execution of the attack.

== Aftermath ==
Egypt's president Abdel Fattah el-Sisi, who had taken office in June 2014 after the 2014 Egyptian presidential election, convened the National Defense Council and Supreme Council of the Armed Forces and declared three days of national mourning. The government pledged to "take all necessary measures to tackle the dangers of terrorism and its financing" to preserve the security of the region. The following day, Sisi claimed that "foreign hands" were behind the attacks and that they were meant to "break the back of Egypt" as well as the Egyptian military, which he described as the state's pillar. He further added that Egypt is engaged in an "existential battle" against terrorism, but he also predicted that the country would prevail in the end. Egypt's outlawed Muslim Brotherhood has condemned attacks and held President Abdel Fattah al-Sisi responsible.

The day after the attack, the government declared North and Central Sinai under a three-month state of emergency, including a daily curfew from 5 PM to 7 AM. On 29 October, Egyptian Prime Minister Ibrahim Mehleb issued a decree ordering the "isolation" and "evacuation" of 79 square kilometers along the Egypt-Gaza border as a buffer zone, which included the entire town of Rafah. According to Egypt, the goal of the buffer zone was to eliminate smuggling tunnels between Egypt and Gaza that allowed fighters and weapons from the Gaza Strip into the Sinai. Human Rights Watch determined that the buffer zone led to the large scale destruction of at least 3,255 buildings in Rafah.

Communications have been shut down, which coincided with a large military operation east of Al-Arish announced by the Ministry of Defense, that was underway in the region to locate and target militant hideouts. The operation reportedly involved Apache helicopters and special forces. The helicopters bombed locations south of Rafah and Sheikh Zuweid, near the Gaza Strip.

Presenters on state television wore black and channels carried black ribbons on screen, while Egypt's Grand Mufti Shawki Allam condemned the attacks, adding that the perpetrators "deserve God's wrath on Earth and at the end of days".

Talks between Israel and Hamas in Cairo following the 2014 Israel–Gaza conflict were postponed due to the state of emergency, and Egypt closed the Rafah border crossing between Egypt and the Gaza Strip indefinitely.

== International response ==
– The European Union denounced the deadly attack against Egyptian security personnel in Sinai. "We regret the loss of life and express our deepest condolences to the families of the victims. The EU condemns terrorism in all its forms," said Michael Mann, spokesman for EU High Representative Catherine Ashton, in a brief statement, released late on Friday.

– Turkey condemned the deadly bombing that targeted Egyptian military forces in the Sinai Peninsula. "We offer our condolences to the victims families and wish for a fast recovery for the injured," Turkey's Foreign Ministry said in a statement on Saturday.

– Singapore strongly condemned the attacks against Egyptian security personnel, and it sent its deepest condolences to the families of the victims and the people of Egypt.

== See also ==
- Islamist unrest in Egypt (2013–2014)
