= December 2013 Mansoura bombing =

Terrorist incident in Egypt

- Part of the Post-coup unrest in Egypt
- Location of Dakahlia Governorate in Egypt
- Location: Mansoura, Dakahlia Governorate, Egypt
- Date: 24 December 2013; 1:10 am EST (UTC+02:00)
- Target: Mansoura security directorate building
- Attack type: Suicide-car bombing
- Weapon: Improvised explosive device
- Deaths: 16
- Injuries: 150
- Perpetrator: Ansar Bait al-Maqdis

The December 2013 Mansoura bombing occurred on the morning of Tuesday, 24 December 2013 in the Nile Delta city of Mansoura in Egypt. The target was the city's security directorate building that was partially collapsed after the attack. At least 16 people were killed, mostly policemen, while more than a hundred were injured, according to the Ministry of Interior. No one immediately claimed responsibility for the bombing but Prime Minister Hazem Al Beblawi, on behalf of the interim government, was quick to blame the Muslim Brotherhood of being behind the attack, labeling it a "terrorist organization" for the first time since the ouster of Mohamed Morsi on 3 July earlier this year. Egyptian authorities also stated that the militants received logistical support from Hamas. Ansar Bait al-Maqdis, an Al-Qaeda-linked group in the Sinai Peninsula, released an online statement claiming responsibility for the blast but the government sounded determined that the Muslim Brotherhood was behind it and intensified its crackdown on the organization. The incident is now widely believed by many to be a turning point in the nation's history as the future of both the Islamists and Egypt's stability remain shadowed and unclear with several violent clashes and other bombings taking place across the country following its ban.

== The explosion ==
Details surrounding the bombing still remain unclear whether it was one or multiple bombs. According to a military statement, a car bomb was involved, while a security source from the Ministry of Interior mentioned a truck containing massive amount of highly explosive material was the cause of the attack. Some eyewitnesses also told prosecutors that they had seen a truck drive into the compound's restricted parking area seconds before the blast. However, explosive experts have not yet been able to fully identify the cause of the explosion and are still examining the site to determine whether the vehicle had been remotely detonated or exploded through a timer. The interior ministry and the military also ruled in the possibility of suicide bombing to be the cause of the attack with initial findings showing body parts inside an exploded vehicle near the site. Al-Ahram quoted an anonymous security source who said that two bombs exploded at the same time with the first exploding on a higher floor in the directorate while the second detonated in a car next to the building. A third bomb in another car was reportedly defused.

== Impact ==
=== Property damage ===
The bomb resulted in the collapse of the façade of the directorate with walls ripped apart from the five-story building and mounds of rubble piled up around it. It had also inflicted massive damage on surrounding buildings including the city council, National Theatre and the United Bank. Port-Said Street, one of the city's largest avenues which lies close to the building, was strongly devastated with dozens of shop windows and displays lying in ruins and the city theatre has completely collapsed. Charred, crumpled and overturned cars were also scattered all around the scene as prosecutors and explosives experts examined them. Thousands of residents reportedly helped with the rescue operations and later returned home once victims of the blast were transferred to area hospitals. Many families had no homes, or food.

=== Deaths and injuries ===
Overall, 16 people were killed and over 100 were injured. The deaths were reported to be 14 officers and conscripts and two civilians. Forensic investigators concluded on Wednesday their autopsy of the bodies of the victims with their injuries, mostly affecting the abdomen, chest and head, were caused by metal fragments from the explosion that were later extracted from the corpses. One of the fatalities, a woman, died beneath the debris of the partially collapsed building after suffering from cerebral hemorrhage and injuries to her lungs and ribs.

The number of injured is estimated to be 134, with thirty-one of them being treated in hospitals in Mansoura and Cairo according to Ahmed Kamel, Health Ministry spokesman. Al-Ahram reported that most of the injured's cases were stable and that the three city hospitals admitting the majority of the cases were well equipped and efficient in dealing with the cases. Thousands of the city's residents heeded official calls to donate blood in area hospitals. However, doctors began turning away potential donors as blood banks acquired large quantities of blood.

== Responsibility ==
Ansar Bait al-Maqdis, which is currently engaged in an armed confrontation with the government in the lawless regions of the Sinai, has released an online statement claiming responsibility for the bombing and identified the name of the perpetrator as Abu Mariam. In the statement they threatened the government forces to "quit their service in the militias of [Defense Minister Abdel Fattah] al-Sisi and [Interior Minister] Mohamed Ibrahim, and learn from the fate of their colleagues [who were killed in the incident]." Another comment by the group on an Islamist forum read:

"Your brothers in Ansar Bait Al-Maqdis, with the grace of God, were able to target the Dakahlia police headquarters"

They have also called several times on the country's security forces before the incident to abandon their positions or "face death" at the hands of its fighters and were responsible for several previous terrorist attacks in the Sinai Peninsula.

== Domestic response ==
Prime Minister Hazem Al Beblawi described the bombing as the "most heinous form of terrorism" and vowed that the perpetrators behind the attack will be brought to justice. Beblawi vowed to hunt down the perpetrators of the explosion saying that the incident was "an act of terrorism that aims at frightening the people and obstructing the roadmap. The black hands behind this act want to destroy the future of our country," and added that the state will do its utmost to pursue the criminals who executed, planned and supported this attack. In addition, acting President Adly Mansour announced three days of national mourning. After the attack, the Egyptian government considered the Muslim Brotherhood to be a terrorist organization.

== International response ==
United States - The U.S. State Department issued a strong condemnation, stating it “condemns in the strongest possible terms today's terrorist attack on the Dakahlia security directorate in Mansoura”. Following the Egyptian interim government’s designation of the Muslim Brotherhood as a terrorist organization, U.S. officials expressed concern. State Department spokesperson Jen Psaki cautioned that this move could undermine an inclusive political transition and called for continued dialogue across Egypt's political spectrum.
