= Abu Osama al-Masri =

Egyptian military personnel

- أبو أسامة المصري
- Born: Muhammad Ahmad ’Ali al-Isawi; 1973; North Sinai Governorate, Egypt
- Died: 15 November 2018 (aged 44–45)
- Cause of death: Airstrike
- Citizenship: Egyptian
- Education: Al-Azhar University
- Occupation: Clothes importer
- Years active: 2013–2018
- Known for: Emir of Islamic State – Sinai Province

Muhammad Ahmad ’Ali al-Isawi (Arabic: محمد أحمد علي العيساوي; 1973 – 15 November 2018), known by the kunya Abu Osama al-Masri (Arabic: أبو أسامة المصري) was an Egyptian jihadist and leader of the Islamic State branch in the Sinai Peninsula, known as Wilayat Sinai.

== History ==
Abu Osama is believed to have been born in North Sinai and grew up in Sharqiya in the Nile Delta. His kunya means 'father of Osama, the Egyptian'.

He was said to be 42 years old as of November 2015, making his birth year 1972 or 1973. He is reported to have been a clothing importer who studied at al-Azhar University, a top Sunni institution in Cairo.

In October 2014, he was believed to have traveled to Syria with about 20 followers when security forces clamped down on militants after former Egyptian President Mohamed Morsi was deposed in the 2013 Egyptian coup d'état.

Abu Osama was a member of Ansar Bait al-Maqdis, the previous name of the Islamic State's Sinai branch.

== Islamic State in Sinai ==
For much of his time in the group he served as head media spokesman.

In May 2015 a recording surfaced where Abu Osama called for attacks against Egyptian judges, saying: "It is wrong for the tyrants [judges] to jail our brothers. Poison their food... surveil them at home and in the street... destroy their homes with explosives if you can."

In November 2015, he became a person of interest in the downing of Metrojet Flight 9268. He claimed responsibility, saying "We are the ones who downed it [Metrojet Flight 9268] by the grace of Allah, and we are not compelled to announce the method that brought it down."

He became leader of Wilayah Sinai in August 2016. An Islamic State – Sinai Province video titled "The Path of Rationality From Darkness to Light" announced that he was killed in 15 November 2018 in an airstrike on an Islamic State location.
