= Ahmed Khaled Hassan Saeed =

Egyptian politician (born 1961)

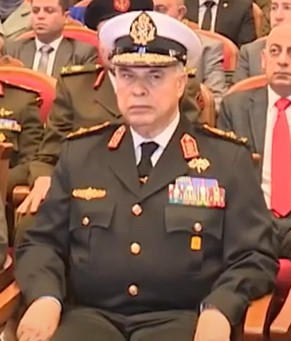

Vice-admiral (Lieutenant-General) Ahmed Khaled Hassan Saeed is an Egyptian national who is the Governor of Alexandria. He previously served as the commander of the Egyptian Navy.

== Biography ==
He was born in 1961.

He attended the Egyptian Naval Academy and graduated in July 1983.

In December 2016, Saeed was promoted to commander (head) of the Egyptian Navy.

In July 2018, he met with British general John Lorimer to discuss the strategic military partnership between Egypt and Britain. In December 2020 he also conducted strategic talks with British First Sea Lord Admiral Tony Radakin. He also toured the British warship HMS Argyll and said that joint-exercises between Egypt and the UK indicated future cooperation.

On 13 August 2021 he toured the USS Monterey at Berenice Naval Base as part of US-Egyptian military maritime cooperation. In 2021, he also met with the Chairman of the Arab Organization for Industrialization at EDEX 2021.

In December 2021, he was replaced as Commander of the Egyptian Navy by Ashraf Ibrahim Atwa. He was appointed as Commander of the Strategic Command.

He was sworn in as Governor of Alexandria by President Abdel Fattah el-Sisi in July 2024. In 2024, he also spoke at the Sea Power for Africa Symposium. In August 2024, he inspected the Martyr Ashraf Al-Khawaja Public School. In October 2024, he met with representatives of the Egyptian oil and gas sector.
