= Osama El-Gendi =

Egyptian admiral

Commander in Chief of the Egyptian Navy
- Incumbent
- Assumed office 14 August 2012
- President: Mohamed Morsi
- Preceded by: Mohab Mamish

Personal details
- Born: 18 January 1953 (age 73)

Military service
- Allegiance: Egypt
- Branch/service: Egyptian Navy
- Years of service: 1973–present
- Rank: Vice Admiral
- Commands: Matrouh Naval Base
- Battles/wars: Yom Kippur War; Egyptian–Libyan War

Osama El-Gendi (Arabic: أسامة الجندي; born 18 January 1953) is an officer in the Egyptian military.

He graduated from the Naval Academy in Alexandria in 1973 in time to serve on a frigate as a fire direction officer during the Yom Kippur War and saw action outside the territorial waters near Damietta. On 14 August 2012, President Mohamed Morsi appointed him as the Commander of the Egyptian Navy after dismissing Vice Admiral Mohab Mamish. He is a member of the Supreme Council of the Armed Forces.

== Military education ==
- Bachelor of the Navy studies
- The captain of the high seas, August's course
- Specific leadership course
- M.A. of military sciences and the navy studies, Egyptian Joint command college
- War staff course (Naval Specialization)
- Crisis Management / Negotiation course
- Advanced War Course - Nasser Military Academy
- Advanced Distinguished leaders Course - Nasser Military Academy.
- M.A. of the global transport, The Arab academy for sciences and technology and the maritime transport.

== Main commands ==
- Commander of Group in the Second Brigade Missile Frigates 1989–1993
- Commander of Second Brigade of Boats 1993–1997
- Chief of Operations of Red Sea Fleet 1997–2000
- Commander of Matrouh Naval Base 2000–2004
- Commander of Red Sea Fleet 2004–2008
- Commander-in-Chief of Alexandria Naval Base and Mediterranean Fleet 2008–2011
- Chief of Naval Operations 2011–2012
- Chief of staff of the Egyptian Navy 2012-

== Medals and decorations ==
- Medal of the 25th of April
- Medal of Military Duty, Second Class.
- Medal of Military Duty, First Class.
- Medal of Training, First Class
- Distinguished Service Decoration.
- Longevity and Exemplary Medal
- Medal of the Egyptian Navy.
- Silver Jubilee Medal of 6 October victory 25th Anniversary
- Golden Jubilee Medal of 23 July 50th Anniversary
- Silver Jubilee Medal of 25 April Anniversary
- January 25 Medal
