= Mohammed Farid Hegazy =

Former Chief of Staff of the Egyptian Armed Forces

- محمد فريد حجازي
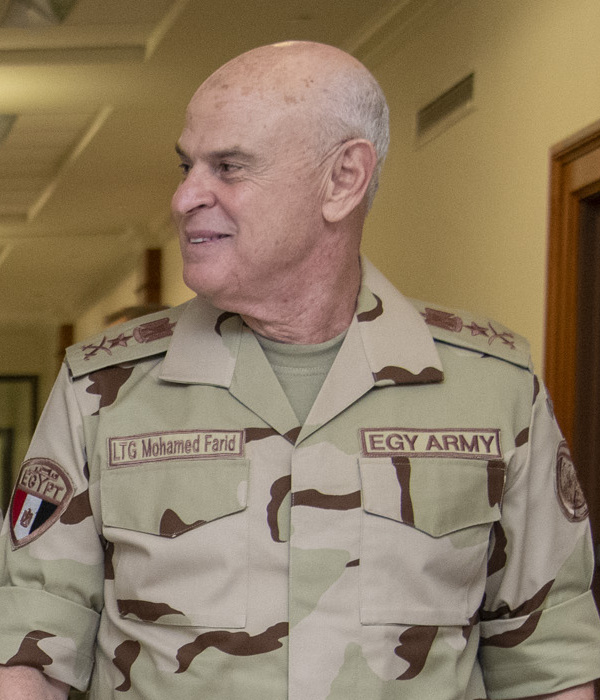
- Hegazy in 2018
- Born: 5 May 1954 (age 72); Egypt
- Military career
- Allegiance: Egypt
- Branch: Egyptian Army
- Service years: 2021
- Rank: Lieutenant General (Egypt)|Lieutenant General
- Commands: Chief of Staff of the Egyptian Armed Forces

Mohammed Farid Hegazy (born 5 May 1954) is the former Chief of Staff of the Egyptian Armed Forces. Previously he was Chief of Staff and then Commander of the Second Field Army (2010–2012), and then Secretary-General of the Ministry of Defence. He served as Chief of Staff from 28 October 2017 to 27 October 2021.
