= Islamic State – Sinai Province =

Branch of the Salafi jihadist group IS

Sinai Province
- ولاية سيناء (Wilayah Sīnāʼ)
- Logo of Wilayat Sinai
- Leaders: Abu Hajar al-Hashemi (governor/wali); Abu Osama al-Masri †; Ashraf Ali Hassanein Gharabali †
- Dates active: 13 November 2014 – 2023
- Country: Egypt
- Headquarters: Sinai Peninsula
- Active regions: Egypt, Gaza Strip
- Ideology: Islamic Statism
- Status: Defunct
- Size: 1,500 (2015); 500 (2025)
- Part of: Islamic State
- Wars: the Sinai insurgency

The Islamic State – Sinai Province (IS-SP; Arabic: الدولة الإسلامية – ولاية سيناء, al-Dawlah al-Islāmiyah – Wilayah Sīnāʼ) was one of the Islamic State branches that was active in Egypt, along with the Islamic State – Egypt Province. It was active mainly on the Sinai Peninsula from 2014 to 2023 and has since been considered defunct.

== Foundation ==
Islamic State – Sinai Province was originally known as Ansar Bait al-Maqdis (ABM) which has been part of the Sinai insurgency and has been especially active in the Sinai Peninsula since 2011 after the deterioration of security there, focusing its efforts on Israel and the Arab gas pipeline to Jordan. Egypt began a crackdown on jihadist groups in Sinai and elsewhere. ABM and other jihadist groups intensified their campaign of attacks on Egyptian security forces.

During 2014, Ansar Bait al-Maqdis (ABM) sent emissaries to IS in Syria to seek financial support, weapons and tactical advice. On 10 November 2014, many members of ABM took an oath of allegiance to Abu Bakr al-Baghdadi, the leader of IS. It adopted the name Sinai Province and has since carried out attacks, mostly in North Sinai, but also in other parts of Egypt. Security officials say militants based in Libya have established ties with Sinai Province. On 13 November 2014, ABM dissolved its loyalty to Al-Qaeda and pledged allegiance to Abu Bakr al-Baghdadi, the leader of the Islamic State (IS), and adopted the name Sinai Province (Wilayat Sīnāʼ) claiming to be a branch of IS.

== Known leaders ==
It was believed that Abu Osama al-Masri was leader of IS-SP from August 2016 until his death in June 2018, but not much other personal information is available. In March 2021, it was reported that another IS-SP leader, Salim Salma Said Mahmoud al-Hamadin, was killed during clashes with Egyptian and Bedouin forces near Al-Barth, south of Rafah.

== Attacks and other activities ==
The group has killed thousands of Egyptian security personnel.

Anecdotal evidence suggests that the group finances its activities by smuggling goods between the Sinai and Gaza. The group has also smuggled weapons from Libya into Sinai.

- On 1 July 2015, the group launched a large scale assault in and around the Sinai town of Sheikh Zuweid, eventually being driven back by Egyptian security forces after at least 100 militants and 17 soldiers were killed in the fighting. According to Brian Fishman of the New America Foundation, the tactics used by the attackers - suicide bombers backed up by direct and indirect fire, mortar fire in combination with small arms, and simultaneous assaults in multiple locations — suggested a transfer of knowledge from IS fighters in Iraq and Syria.
- The group claimed to have shot three Grad rockets on 3 July 2015 from Sinai to southern Israel near the Gaza Strip. Two rocket hits were confirmed in Eshkol, which did not result in any injury or property damage. Israel did not respond to the attack.
- On 16 July 2015, the group claimed responsibility for a rocket attack on an Egyptian Navy patrol boat on the north coast of Sinai, close to the Gaza Strip.
- On 12 August 2015, Croatian citizen Tomislav Salopek was abducted in Egypt by the group. Sinai Province published a still image purporting to show Salopek's decapitated body. Croatian and Egyptian authorities condemned the abduction, with Sinai Province accusing the Croatian Armed Forces of "war against the Islamic State." In November 2015, Egyptian authorities proclaimed that they eliminated a suspect of Salopek's murder Ashraf Ali al-Gharabali.
- The group claimed responsibility for bringing down Russian aircraft Metrojet Flight 9268, carrying 224 passengers. It was flying to Saint Petersburg from Sharm el-Sheikh on 31 October 2015, when it broke up over Hasna (Egypt), killing all on board. Data obtained from the airplane black boxes gives credence to the theory that there was a bomb attack. On 17 November 2015, Russian President Vladimir Putin confirmed that a bomb attack brought down the aircraft.
- One of the group's leaders, Ashraf Ali Hassanein Gharabali, was shot and killed in a shoot-out with Egyptian security forces in Cairo on 10 November 2015. The Egyptian Interior Ministry linked Gharabali to a string of attacks including an assassination attempt on the Interior Minister.
- The group claimed responsibility for an attack on the Arab gas pipeline on 7 January 2016.
- In December 2016, the group revealed the name of its governor or wali (leader) to be Abu Hajar al-Hashemi.
- In February 2017, IS-linked operatives launched four Grad rockets from Egyptian territory in Sinai peninsula on the Israeli southernmost city of Eilat, prompting the Israeli Iron Dome system to intercept three of the rockets, with no physical casualties or damage reported, though 11 civilians were brought to hospital to be treated for shock.
- In March 2017, the group released a video titled "The Light of the Islamic Law", in which they were shown blowing up Egyptian patrols, destroying TV sets, desecrating and detonating graves, executing prisoners and captured Egyptian soldiers, and beheading two old men (one an elder who voiced opposition to IS, and the other a street magician performer).
- It was reported on 21 April 2017 that an Egyptian air raid killed 19 IS fighters, including three unnamed leaders.
- On July 7, 2017 IS-Sinai Province militants encircled and ambushed an Egyptian military base in Rafah known as el Barth, 20 Egyptian troops were killed (including colonel Ahmed Mansi) and 3 others wounded. 46 IS-Sinai province militants were killed with the loss of 6 vehicles. Most of the base was demolished after a suicidal car bomb.
- On 24 November 2017, In the Bir al-Abed attack jihadists killed 311 people and injured at least 122.
- On 19 December 2017, one officer was killed and two were injured in a failed assassination attempt on the Minister of Interior Magdi Abdel-Ghaffar and the minister of defense Sedki Sobhy.
- On 29 December 2017, 11 were killed in the attack on Saint Menas church in Helwan (south of Cairo).
- In January 2018, IS-Sinai released a video which showed the execution of an accused Hamas smuggler for smuggling weapons to Hamas’ Izz al-Din al‑Qassam Brigades.
- From 2018 to 2020, 840 militants were killed by Egyptian Security Forces who lost 67 soldiers in return. In March 2020, Egyptian forces managed to kill Abu Fares Al-Ansari, a commander of Ansar Bait al-Maqdis, in Al Ajra' area south of Rafah.
- On 1 May 2020, IS claimed responsibility via its Amaq News Agency for a bombing that killed and wounded several Egyptian Army personnel near the city of Bir al-Abd in North Sinai Governorate. In retaliation, Egyptian police managed to kill 18 extremist militants in a raid in northern Sinai Peninsula.
- On 21 July 2020, IS captured five villages in Sinai west of Bir al-Abd.
- On 8 May 2022, ten soldiers and one officer were killed during an attack at a checkpoint at a water pumping station in El Qantara.
- In August 2022, videos and photographs were circulated over social media, showing how the army-affiliated militias executed three shackled or wounded men in custody. The executions were extrajudicial. Human Rights Watch called for the Egyptian authorities to immediately open a “transparent and impartial investigation” into the violations.
- On November 18, 2022, dozens of IS fighters clashed with the Egyptian army on a government building in Al-Ismailia, which resulted in killing and wounding 6 members of the Egyptian army and an airstrike on IS fighters.
- On December 1, 2022, IS soldiers killed and wounded 6 members of the Egyptian police in Al-Ismailia governorate.
- On December 31, 2022, two gunmen killed and wounded 15 of the Egyptian police in Al-Ismailia governorate.

== See also ==
- Sinai insurgency
- Ansar Bait al-Maqdis
