= Magdy Abdel Ghaffar =

Egyptian politician

- مجدي عبد الغفار
- Born: 14 August 1952 (age 73); Monufia Governorate, Egypt
- Title: Minister of Interior

Magdy Abdel Ghaffar (Arabic: مجدي عبد الغفار) is the former Interior Minister of Egypt who was in office from March 6, 2015 until June 14, 2018.
