= Ashraf Ibrahim Atwa =

Egyptian rear admiral

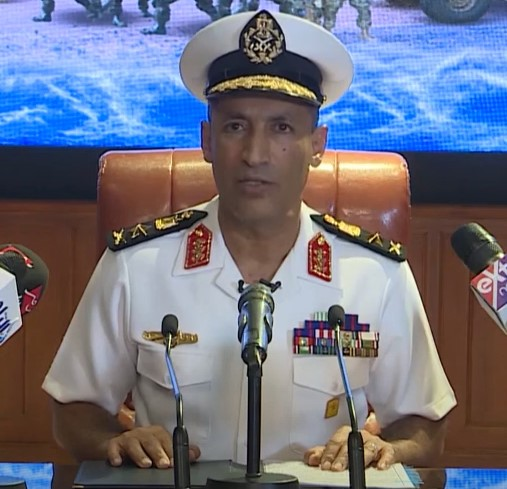
- Born: 1961 (age 64–65); United Arab Republic (present-day Egypt)
- Military career
- Allegiance: Egypt
- Branch: Navy
- Rank: Rear admiral
- Commands: Southern Fleet; Port Said Base; Red Sea Base

Ashraf Ibrahim Atwa Megahed (born 1961) is an Egyptian Vice admiral and the current commander of the Egyptian Navy. Before he assumed the office in December 2021, he served as chief of staff of the Navy.

Megahed obtained his graduation in 1983 with a bachelor's degree in maritime studies and master's in military studies.

His previous assignments includes commander of the Southern Fleet, in addition to serving as commander of the naval bases stationed at the Port Said and the Red Sea.

== Awards and distinctions ==
- Medal of Military Duty
- Medal of Long Service
- Medal of Good Example
- Medal of Distinguished Service
- Medal of 25 January
- Medal of 30 June
