= Ansar Bait al-Maqdis =

Defunct Egyptian jihadist militant group (2011–2014)

Ansar Beit al-Maqdis (ABM)
- أنصار بيت المقدس
- Flag of Ansar Bait al-Maqdis Logo of Ansar Bait al-Maqdis
- Leaders: Waleed Waked (POW); Ibrahim Mohamed Freg †; Shadi el-Manaei
- Dates active: 2011–10 November 2014
- Headquarters: Sinai Peninsula
- Active regions: Egypt; Gaza Strip
- Ideology: Islamic Statism (since 2014): Islamism; Islamic extremism; Islamic fundamentalism; Takfirism; Qutbism; Wahabism; Salafism; Salafist jihadism; Anti-Christian sentiment; Anti-Zionism; Antisemitism
- Size: 1,000–2,000 (before merger with IS)
- Wars: the Sinai insurgency and Gaza–Israel conflict

Ansar Bait al-Maqdis (ABM; Arabic: أنصار بيت المقدس, romanized: Anṣār Bayt al-Maqdis, lit. 'Supporters of the Holy House'), or Ansar Al-Quds (Arabic: أنصار القدس, romanized: Anṣār al-Quds, lit. 'Supporters of Jerusalem'), was an Islamist jihadist, extremist militant group operating in the Sinai Peninsula from 2011 to 2014.

Ansar Bait al-Maqdis was linked with al-Qaeda. It operated in Sinai, focusing its efforts on Egypt and the gas pipeline to Jordan, with a handful attacks directed at Israel. In mid-2013, it began a campaign of attacks on Egyptian security forces, and in November 2014 pledged allegiance to the Islamic State (IS). Most of the group became a branch of IS, renaming itself Islamic State - Sinai Province.

== Overview ==
ABM emerged from a number of indigenous Salafi jihadist groups in the Sinai Peninsula. Some of these groups had ties to Salafi jihadis in Gaza.

ABM rose from the chaos in Sinai that began with the uprising in January 2011. Its operations increased in the wake of the 2013 Egyptian coup d'état, shifting its main target from Israel to Egyptian security forces, declaring the Egyptian army and police apostates that can be killed.

ABM was believed to have been the main group behind terrorist activity in the Sinai. From September 2013 to late January 2014, ABM claimed responsibility for a rapid succession of mass scale attacks throughout Egypt, including the attempted assassination of the Egyptian interior minister Mohamed Ibrahim. ABM recruited Bedouins as well as other Egyptians and people of other nationalities. Ten leaders from the group were reported to have escaped from the Sinai to Gaza and Marsa Matrouh in late 2013.

During 2014, ABM sent emissaries to IS in Syria to seek financial support, weapons and tactical advice. On 10 November 2014, many members of ABM took an oath of allegiance to Abu Bakr al-Baghdadi, the leader of IS. Following this pledge, IS supporters within ABM formed an official branch of IS in the region, known as Wilayat Sinai, the Sinai Province of the Islamic State (or IS-SP).

== Designation as a terrorist organization ==
ABM or IS-SP was designated a terrorist organization by Egypt, the UAE, the United Kingdom, and the United States.

== Attacks ==
Attacks claimed by or attributed to ABM include:

- bombing of the gas pipelines Egypt to Israel and Jordan multiple times.
- September 2012 southern Israel cross-border attack.
- September 2013 assassination attempt on the minister of interior Mohamed Ibrahim Moustafa.
- October 2013 attack on a military intelligence building in Ismailia.
- November 2013, assassination of Mohamed Mabrouk, a security officer involved in the trial against Mohamed Morsi, who was shot dead outside his home in Nasr City.
- 24 December 2013 bombing of a police compound in Mansoura, killing at least 16 people, including 14 police officers.
- 31 January 2014, a rocket was launched from the Sinai Peninsula aimed at Eilat, Israel. The Iron Dome system intercepted the rocket.
- 20 January 2014 attack in Eilat. No damage or injuries were reported.
- 23 January 2014 attack on a police checkpoint in Beni Suef that killed 5 people.
- January 2014 Cairo bombings that took place in late January 2014, though it later indicated that the Soldiers of Egypt group was behind one of the bombings.
- 25 January 2014 shooting down of a military helicopter in the Sinai.
- 28 January 2014 assassination of Mohamed Al-Saied (who was a member of Egypt's Interior Ministry).
- 31 January 2014 attempted attack on Eilat. The rocket was intercepted by the Iron Dome system.
- 16 February 2014 Taba bus bombing that killed four people, including three Korean tourists and an Egyptian bus driver. The group warned all tourists to leave Egypt before 20 February 2014.
- 2 May 2014 attacks that killed 3 people in the Sinai.
- on 19 July 2014 Ansar Bait al-Maqdis ambushed Egyptian army soldiers; this event is known as the 2014 Farafra ambush.
- on 28 August 2014 ABM released a video showing the beheading of 4 Egyptians accused of being Mossad spies and providing Israel with intelligence.
- late September 2014 killing of 6 security personnel.
- On 8 October 2014, a faction of ABM in the Gaza Strip, calling itself the Islamic State of Gaza, launched a bomb attack on the French Cultural Center in the city of Gaza, only to issue a statement several hours later denying any responsibility for the attack.
- ABM released a graphic propaganda video claiming responsibility for the 24 October 2014 Sinai attacks that killed 28 soldiers northwest of the town of Arish. The group was also responsible for a drive-by shooting several hours later at a checkpoint in Arish that killed three soldiers.

After November 2014, attacks by the group were claimed as those of ISIL-SP.

== See also ==
- Sinai insurgency
- Timeline of the Sinai insurgency
- Islamist anti-Hamas groups in the Gaza Strip
