= List of massacres in Egypt =

The following is a list of massacres that have occurred in Egypt (numbers may be approximate):

Name	Date	Location	Deaths	Notes
Alexandria riot (66)	66 CE	Alexandria, Roman Egypt	50,000 (estimated)	An extensive pogrom organized by Roman governor Tiberius Julius Alexander began after the First Jewish–Roman War broke out. Roman troops were responsible for the wholesale slaughter of the city's Jewish population.
Caracalla's massacre in Alexandria	215 CE	Alexandria, Roman Egypt	Unknown	After citizens started mocking emperor Caracalla, he ordered Alexandria's population to be massacred. According to the historian Herodian, Roman soldiers gathered all young men of military age they could find into a nearby plain where they were hacked to death and thrown inside mass graves.
Damanhur massacre	10 May 1799	Damanhur	1,500	The city rebelled against the French, when the French led by General Lanusse recaptured, most of the city inhabitants and rebels were killed and the place was torched.
Mamluke massacre	1 March 1811	Cairo	470	Heads sent to Istanbul; part of Muhammad Ali's seizure of power
1948 Cairo bombings	June–September, 1948	Cairo	70	200 injured. Muslim Brotherhood in Egypt targeted Jewish areas, killing 70 Jews and wounding nearly 200. Members of the Society were charged with carrying out all the bombings against the Jews of Cairo from June to November 1948.
Israeli bombing of Cairo	15 July 1948	Cairo	30	The Israeli Air Force bombarded a residential neighborhood near Qasr al-Qubba in Cairo killed 30 civilians and destroyed many homes
Cairo fire	26 January 1952	Cairo	26	anti-British riots, 552 injured
Tora Prison massacre	1 June 1957	Cairo	21	21 members of the Muslim Brotherhood in Egypt were extrajudicially executed in Tora Prison.
Ras Sedr massacre	8 June 1967	Sinai Peninsula, Ras Sedr	52	An Israeli paratrooper unit extrajudicially executed several Egyptian prisoners of war during the Six-Day War.
1967 El Arish massacre	8 June 1967	Sinai Peninsula: Arish, the International Airport, and the mountains of the Sinai.	400	Massacre of Egyptian prisoners of war by the Israel Defense Forces during the Six Day War. According to the Egyptian Organization for Human Rights, the Israel Defense Forces massacred "hundreds” of Egyptian prisoners of war and wounded soldiers in the Sinai peninsula, on 8 June 1967. Survivors alleged that approximately 400 wounded Egyptians were buried alive outside the captured El Arish International Airport, and that 150 prisoners in the mountains of the Sinai were run over by Israeli tanks. Conservative Israeli media denies the massacre.
Bahr El-Baqar primary school bombing	8 April 1970	Bahr el-Baqar	46	The Bahr El-Baqar primary school is bombed by the Israeli Air Force, killing 46 children.
1973 War massacres	1973	Suez Canal and Cairo	66	After a contingent of 19 IDF soldiers surrendered, Egyptian troops summarily executed 11 of them as the prisoners of war raised their hands in the air. Further IDF prisoners were executed in Cairo
Ras Burqa massacre	5 October 1985	Ras Burqa	8	An Egyptian soldier opened fire on Israeli vacationers, killing 3 adults and 4 children, as well as another Egyptian soldier.
1986 Egyptian conscripts riot	25 February 1986	Cairo	107	A three-day riot begins in Cairo, when around 25,000 conscripts of the Central Security Forces (CSF), staged protests in and around the city. Three luxury hotels, several nightclubs, restaurants and cars were looted and burned in the tourist districts near the Pyramids over several days. An estimated 107 people, mostly conscripts, were killed in total.
Luxor massacre	17 November 1997	Luxor	64	killing of mostly tourists, on 17 November 1997, at Deir el-Bahari, an archaeological site and major tourist attraction across the Nile from Luxor, Egypt.
Kosheh massacres	2 January 2000	Kosheh	21	Over 40 injured; Muslim mob attacked Coptic Christians.
2004 Sinai bombings	7 October 2004	Sinai Peninsula	34	171 injured; a terrorist group killed 18 Egyptians, 12 Israelis, 2 Italians, 1 Russian, and 1 American.
2005 Sharm el-Sheikh attacks	23 July 2005	Sharm el-Sheikh	64–88	~150 injured; multiple bombs targeting tourist hotels and the bazaar in the resort city on the southern tip of the Sinai Peninsula.
2006 Dahab bombings	24 April 2006	Dahab	23	~80 injured; three nails bombs exploded targeting the central tourist area of Dahab on the southern tip of the Sinai Peninsula.
Nag Hammadi massacre	7 January 2010	Nag Hammadi	11	11 injured; Muslim gunmen opened fire on Coptic Christians as they were leaving church.
2011 Alexandria bombing	1 January 2011	Alexandria	23	A homemade nail bomb attack on Coptic Christians in Alexandria on Saturday, 1 January 2011. 23 people died and another 97 were injured, which occurred as Christian worshipers were leaving a New Year service.
2011 Imbaba church attacks	7 May 2011	Imbaba	15	A series of attacks that took place in Egypt on 7 May 2011 against Coptic Christian churches in the poor working-class neighborhood of Imbaba in Giza, near Cairo. The attacks were blamed on Salafi Muslims, the attacks began when Muslims attacked the Coptic Orthodox church of Saint Mina. 232 injured.
Maspero demonstrations	9 October 2011	Cairo	24	The Maspero massacre initially started as demonstrations by a group of Egyptian Christians, in reaction to the demolition of a church in Upper Egypt. The peaceful protesters who intended to stage a sit-in in front of the Maspiro television building were attacked by security forces and the army, resulting in 24 deaths and 212 injuries, most of which were sustained by Coptic Christians.
Port Said Stadium riot	1 February 2012	Port Said	74	After a football match, thugs and hooligans of the local team attacked visiting fans of El Ahly from Cairo with clubs, stones, knives and swords. Policemen refused to open the stadium gates, so the crowd could not escape.
August 2013 Rabaa massacre	14 August 2013	al-Nahda Square and Rabaa al-Adawiya Square, Cairo, Egypt	1000+ (Note: Human Rights Watch's estimate.)	1000+ killed; police and military opened fire on demonstrators opposing the military's ouster of Mohammad Morsi, the first elected president of Egypt who was removed from power following the 2013 Egyptian coup d'état. In addition to thousands of protester casualties, 8 police officers were killed.
Kerdasa massacre	14 August 2013	Kerdasa, Giza Governorate	14	12 policemen and two civilians were killed by an angry mob in return for the August 2013 Rabaa massacre.
2015 Wahat convoy incident	12 September 2015	Western Desert	12	Egyptian security forces kills eight Mexican tourists and four Egyptian guides in the Western Desert after allegedly mistaking them for terrorists.
Metrojet Flight 9268	31 October 2015	Sinai Peninsula	224	A Metrojet A321 aircraft carrying mainly Russian tourists was destroyed by a bomb above the northern Sinai following its departure from Sharm El Sheikh International Airport, Egypt, en route to Pulkovo Airport, Saint Petersburg, Russia. All 224 passengers and crew on board were killed. The cause of the crash was an onboard explosive device concealed within a can of soda in passenger luggage. Islamic State claimed responsibility.
Palm Sunday church bombings	9 April 2017	Tanta & Alexandria	45	On Palm Sunday, 9 April 2017, twin suicide bombings took place at St. George's Church in the northern Egyptian city of Tanta on the Nile delta, and Saint Mark's Coptic Orthodox Cathedral, the principal church in Alexandria, seat of the Coptic papacy. At least 45 people were reported killed and 126 injured. Amaq News Agency said the attacks were carried out by a security detachment of the ISIS.
2017 Minya bus attack	26 May 2017	Minya	33	Islamic State gunman opened fire on a bus of Egyptian Christians; a similar attack happened near the same place in 2018
2017 Sinai mosque attack	24 November 2017	Al-Rawda	311	40 gunmen attacked the al-Rawda mosque during Friday prayers.
2018 Minya bus attack	2 November 2018	Minya	7	Islamic State gunman opened fire on a bus of Egyptian Christians; a similar attack happened near the same place in 2017
