= Saint Menas church attack =

2017 terrorist attack in Cairo, Egypt

Attack on Saint Mena church
- Saint Menas church attack (Egypt) Saint Menas church attack (Middle East)
- Location: 29.8503894°N 31.3218585°E; Helwan, Cairo, Egypt
- Date: 29 December 2017 (UTC+02:00; EGY)
- Target: Coptic Christians
- Attack type: Mass shooting; mass murder
- Weapon: Gun
- Deaths: 11
- Injuries: 10
- Perpetrator: ISIS

On 29 December 2017, in Helwan, Cairo, Egypt, a gunman opened fire at the Coptic Orthodox Church of Saint Menas and a nearby shop owned by a Coptic man, killing ten citizens and a police officer and injuring around ten people. The gunman was wounded by police and arrested. Investigators said he had carried out several attacks in the last year. Later, Amaq News Agency attributed it to the Islamic State group.

== See also ==
- Persecution of Copts
- 2011 Alexandria bombing
- 2011 Imbaba church attacks
- Botroseya Church bombing
- Christianity in Egypt
- Coptic Orthodox Church
- Kosheh massacres
- Nag Hammadi massacre
- 2017 Minya attack
