= 2018 Minya bus attack =

Mass shooting in Egypt

Coordinates: 28.7395°N 30.6205°E

- Part of the Insurgency in Egypt (2013–present)
- 2018 Minya bus attack (Egypt) 2018 Minya bus attack (Middle East)
- Location: Minya, Egypt
- Date: November 2, 2018; 8 years ago
- Target: Coptic Christians
- Deaths: 7
- Injuries: 12
- Perpetrator: Islamic State
- Assailants: 19 militants (all killed two days later by police)

On 2 November 2018, masked gunmen opened fire on a group of Egyptian Christians travelling by bus through Minya. There was a convoy of three vehicles and two of them managed to escape. The vehicles were carrying Copts traveling from Sohag Governorate and Minya Governorate in Egypt to the Monastery of Saint Samuel the Confessor. At least 7 people from Minya were killed while 12 others were injured. A similar attack near the same place had happened in 2017.

== Background ==
Copts have faced growing persecution and sectarian violence in Egypt since the early 2010s, including several in the last two years, all claimed by the Islamic State.

A similar attack happened on 26 May 2017, when masked gunman opened fire on a convoy carrying Copts in the same route of this attack, killing 29 people and wounding 22 others.

On 29 December 2017, a gunman killed at least 11 people in attacks on a Coptic Orthodox church and a Christian-owned shop near Cairo before he was wounded and arrested.

On 9 April 2017, Palm Sunday, terrorists bombed two Coptic churches — St. George's Church in the northern Egyptian city of Tanta on the Nile Delta, and Saint Mark's Coptic Orthodox Cathedral, the principal church in Alexandria — killing 47 people and injuring at least 126 others.

On 11 December 2016, a suicide bomber killed 29 people and injured 47 others at St. Peter and St. Paul's Church (commonly known as El-Botroseya Church)

== Attack ==
On 2 November 2018, three buses left Monastery of Saint Samuel the Confessor carrying Coptic Christians on their way to Minya. The Buses were ambushed by Islamic state fighters around Minya. During the ambush, the first two buses managed to escape with 12 injured passengers however the third bus was unable to escape the ambush and was forced to come to a stop. Seven civilians on board the bus were killed.

== Response and reactions ==
Two days later, 19 militants involved in the attack were killed in a shoot-out with the police.

Pope Francis prayed for the victims in his Sunday Angelus Address, subsequent to the killings.

== See also ==
- 2011 Alexandria bombing
- 2011 Imbaba church attacks
- Botroseya Church bombing
- Christianity in Egypt
- Coptic Orthodox Church
- Kosheh massacres
- Nag Hammadi massacre
- 2017 Minya attack
- Persecution of Copts
