= Palm Sunday church bombings =

2017 suicide bombings at Coptic churches in Egypt

2017 Palm Sunday church bombings
- Part of Insurgency in Egypt (2013–present)
- Palm Sunday church bombings (Egypt)
- Location: 30.792838°N 31.005390°E (Tanta), 31.198363°N 29.899601°E (Alexandria); Tanta and Alexandria, Egypt
- Date: 9 April 2017, Palm Sunday
- Target: Coptic Christians
- Attack type: Suicide bombings
- Weapon: Explosive vests
- Deaths: 43
- Injuries: 136
- Perpetrator: ISIS
- No. of participants: 3
- Motive: Anti-Christian sentiment fueled by radical Islamic extremism

On Palm Sunday, 9 April 2017, twin suicide bombings took place at St. George's Church in the northern Egyptian city of Tanta on the Nile Delta, and Saint Mark's Coptic Orthodox Cathedral, the principal church in Alexandria, seat of the Coptic papacy. At least 43 people were reported killed and 789 injured. The attacks were carried out by a security detachment of ISIS.

== Background ==
In February 2017, ISIS called for attacks on Christians, and during the Sinai insurgency, hundreds of Christians fled their homes in the North Sinai after a "concerted campaign of assassination and intimidation". The bombings occurred under President (and former general) Abdel Fattah el-Sisi who has emphasized national security during his rule, and who recently returned from a trip to the United States to visit President Donald Trump, a trip widely regarded as successful and as a confirmation of the US administration's support for Sisi's fight against ISIS.

== Bombing ==
After bombing in Alexandria

On Palm Sunday, 9 April 2017, an explosive device was detonated inside St. George's Church in the Nile Delta city of Tanta. According to eyewitnesses, as they were attending the Divine Liturgy, a man in a brown jacket rapidly charged toward the altar before detonating an explosive belt. This man, Mahmoud Mohamed Ali Hussein, is believed to have been in charge of both church bombings in Tanta and Alexandria. Video footage showed people assembled at the church, chanting the liturgy. The video rapidly changed to bars, as screams of terror and crying were heard in the background. A preliminary report by the prosecution determined that the bomb contained TNT, as well as large amounts of metallic screws and highly flammable substances.

Later at Saint Mark's Coptic Orthodox Cathedral in Alexandria, historical seat of the Coptic papacy, another device exploded near the cathedral's gates. The incident occurred minutes after Pope Tawadros II left the church to follow the developments of the Tanta bombing. The pope escaped unharmed. Conflicting reports emerged over the identity of the perpetrator. Egyptian television published a photo of a man who was stopped and interrogated near the entrance. The suspect reportedly detonated a suicide belt when members of the security force, assigned to this church, tried to arrest him. Other camera footage, however, showed a different man trying to pass through the metal detectors at the entrance, a few seconds before the bomb went off.

== Casualties ==
The two bombings killed at least 43 people and injured hundreds more.

== Aftermath ==
In Tanta, security forces sealed off all the streets leading to the church and set up emergency checkpoints, allowing bomb disposal experts to examine the church and cars parked in its surroundings for any remaining explosives. Egypt's interior minister, Magdy Abdel Ghaffar, Prosecutor-General, Nabil Sadek, and other government officials arrived at the scene shortly after the bombing. Forensic experts identified an unknown severed head as a possible suspect in the attack. Tanta's residents, who were demonstrating nearby, physically assaulted Major General Hossam el-Din Khalifa, head of the Gharbia's Security Directorate. Khalifa, along with other heads of security, were dismissed later that day by Abdel Ghaffar.

Three other explosive devices were dismantled by police. Two of them were left by an unknown individual in front of Sidi Abdel Rahim Mosque in Tanta, which contains a Sufi shrine. The other was in Alexandria's Collège Saint Marc.

=== State of emergency ===
On the same day, Egyptian President Abdel Fattah el-Sisi declared a three-month state of emergency. The attack was seen as underscoring the failure of Egypt's intelligence agencies to "anticipate a coordinated wave of attacks" and the difficulty of stopping suicide attacks, despite the "largely unfettered powers" of Sisi and his imprisonment and exiling of "thousands of political opponents".

The state of emergency declaration required approval from the Parliament of Egypt, after which Sisi would have the authority to increase the powers of the police in arrests, surveillance, and seizures. The state of emergency was continuously extended every three months since its inception until October 2021.

== Responsibility ==
An online statement via the Amaq News Agency said, "A security detachment of the Islamic State carried out the attacks against the two churches in the cities of Tanta and Alexandria". The two Egyptian suicide bombers were named Abu Ishaq Al-Masri and Abu Al-Baraa Al-Masri.

The group previously said the Islamic State was responsible for the December 2016 Botroseya Church bombing at St. Peter and St. Paul's Church in Cairo, which killed 29 people and injured 47 others.

=== Identification ===
On 12 April 2017, Egyptian Interior Ministry identified Mahmud Hassan Mubarak Abdullah, born in 1986 in Qena Governorate, as the bomber who had carried out the attack outside Saint Mark's church in Alexandria by comparing the DNA of remains found at the site of the bombing with the DNA of runaway suspects. A day later, Egyptian authorities identified the second bomber as Mamduh Amin Mohammed Baghdadi, born in 1977 in Qena Governorate.

== Reactions ==
=== Domestic ===
Egyptian President Abdel Fattah el-Sisi summoned the national security council, and said that those wounded could receive medical care at military hospitals. The following day, president el-Sisi declared a three-month state of emergency across the country.

The Egyptian Council of Churches, through its secretary-general, priest Rifaat Fathy, expressed its condolences to the victims' relatives and to Pope Tawadros II, and announced its support to Sisi's swift response to the events and to the counter-terrorism efforts of the country's security apparatus.

The head of Al-Azhar, Egypt's leading center for the study of Sunni Islam, Sheikh Ahmed el-Tayeb, denounced the deadly attacks, calling them a "despicable terrorist bombing that targeted the lives of innocents." Following the attacks, Muslims gathering inside mosques to donate blood for victims. Egyptians also showed solidarity with the victims by using a hashtag on social media that translates to "your terrorism brings us together."

=== From a Coptic Orthodox Priest ===
Father Boules George, a Coptic Orthodox priest in Cairo, delivered a Holy Week sermon the night of the attacks, addressing the attack, and the attackers. In it, he expresses his gratitude and love to those who oppress the church.

=== International ===
Representatives of the governments of Armenia, Australia, Canada, China, Colombia, Cyprus, France, Germany, Greece, Hungary, India, Indonesia, Iran, Iraq, Israel, Japan, Jordan, Lebanon, Malaysia, Morocco, Pakistan, Poland, Romania, Russia, Saudi Arabia, Singapore, Switzerland, Syria, Turkey, and the United States condemned the attacks and expressed condolences, as did the United Nations Security Council and United Nations Secretary-General António Guterres.

The Holy See received news of the attacks while Pope Francis was holding the Palm Sunday mass in front of thousands in St. Peter's Square. The Pope, who was due to visit Egypt on 28 April, offered his condolences to his "brother" Tawadros II and to "all of the dear Egyptian nation" during his speech, while praying for the dead and the wounded. The World Council of Churches and the Archbishop of Canterbury, Justin Welby, also spoke out against the attacks. Despite the events, the Pope's visit to Egypt proceeded as planned.

Saudi Arabia's highest religious body, the Council of Senior Scholars (also known as the Senior Council of Ulema), condemned the attacks, saying the bombings represented a "criminal act considered forbidden by Islamic consensus...these bombings have violated several tenants [sic] of Islam; from treachery to sin and aggression."

The international Muslim Brotherhood condemned the attack as "painfully tragic" and that "the blood of the innocent will be a curse on the oppressors" whilst stating blame was due to the government which took power after the 2013 coup in Egypt.

After the attacks, Israel closed the Taba Border Crossing with Egypt.

== See also ==
- 2017 Minya attack
- Kosheh massacres
- Nag Hammadi massacre
- 2011 Alexandria bombing
- 2011 Imbaba church attacks
- Botroseya Church bombing
- Christianity in Egypt
- Coptic Orthodox Church
- Persecution of Copts
- 2025 Mar Elias Church suicide bombing
