= Egypt church bombing =

Egypt church bombing may refer to:

- 2011 Alexandria bombing
- 2016 Botroseya Church bombing
- 2017 Palm Sunday church bombings
