= 2017 Minya bus attack =

Attack in Egypt

Coordinates: 28.7395°N 30.6205°E

- Part of the Insurgency in Egypt (2013–present)
- 2017 Minya bus attack (Egypt) 2017 Minya bus attack (Middle East)
- Location: Minya, Egypt
- Date: 26 May 2017; 9 years ago
- Target: Coptic Christians
- Deaths: 33
- Injuries: 22
- Perpetrator: ISIS

Martyrs of the monastery of Saint Samuel the Confessor

Martyrs
- Died: 26 May 2017; Minya, Egypt
- Venerated in: Coptic Orthodox Church
- Feast: 15 February (Amshir 8)

On 26 May 2017, masked gunmen opened fire on a convoy carrying Copts from Maghagha in Egypt's Minya Governorate to the Monastery of Saint Samuel the Confessor, killing at least 33 people and injuring 22 others.

== Background ==
Copts have faced growing persecution and sectarian violence in Egypt since the early 2010s. In February 2017, the Islamic State of Iraq and the Levant's Sinai chapter called for attacks on Christians, causing hundreds of Christians in the North Sinai region to flee their homes and avoid celebrating the Easter holiday. On 9 April 2017, Palm Sunday, ISIS-SP bombed two Coptic churches—St. George's Church in the northern Egyptian city of Tanta on the Nile Delta, and Saint Mark's Coptic Orthodox Cathedral, the principal church in Alexandria—killing 45 people and injuring at least 125 others. In response to the Palm Sunday attacks, President Abdel Fattah el-Sisi announced a nationwide three-month-long state of emergency.

== Attack ==
The three-vehicle convoy was near the village of Adwa in northern Minya Governorate, near the border with Beni Suef Governorate, when it was ambushed on a road to the monastery by 8-10 Arab tribesmen with guns reportedly in military-style uniforms. Attackers shot at a mini-bus containing children, killing at least six, including a four-year-old and two-year-old. Gunmen also entered a bus in the convoy, stealing phones and jewelry from female riders and killing the men, "leaving Islamist leaflets among the bodies." Some men and boys were also removed from the bus and asked to recite the Shahada, and they were shot dead when they refused to do so. A pickup truck in the convoy with workmen headed to the monastery was also targeted, and at least eight workers were killed. After the attack, the gunmen drove off in three four-wheel drive vehicles.

No group took immediate responsibility for the attack, although analysts suspected that ISIS was responsible. Amaq News Agency attributed it to "(a) group that belongs to Islamic State". ISIS later released an official statement claiming credit. Others have argued, however, that al-Qaeda loyalist Hesham Ashmawy and his al-Mourabitoun network were responsible for the Minya attack.

== Response ==
After the attack, Egyptian President Abdel Fattah el-Sisi organized an emergency meeting with top security officials. Security forces in Minya sent out patrols and set up checkpoints along roads in the area in an attempt to find the attackers. In the evening of the day of the attacks, the president appeared on television to address the nation and announced he had ordered retaliatory attacks against terrorist training camps in neighboring Libya. State media said fighter jets had conducted six strikes against sites in the vicinity of the port city of Derna where the militants responsible for the attack are believed to have trained.

A second wave of airstrikes was launched the following day, 27 May. On 29 May 2017, a spokesperson for the Libyan National Army (LNA) confirmed that Egypt and the LNA had cooperated in targeting locations in Derna as well as Jufra with 15 airstrikes launched.

== Reactions ==
Grand Imam of al-Azhar Ahmed el-Tayeb said from Germany, "I call on Egyptians to unite in the face of this brutal terrorism."

Cardinal Secretary of State Pietro Parolin stated in a telegram to President Abdel Fattah el-Sisi that Pope Francis was "deeply saddened to learn of the barbaric attack" and that he expressed his "heartfelt solidarity with all those affected by this violent outrage." He also stated that "Pope Francis assures all who have been injured of his ardent prayers, and he pledges his continued intercession for peace and reconciliation throughout the nation."

Russian President Vladimir Putin expressed his condolences and said Russia remains a reliable ally of Egypt in the fight against terrorism.

U.S. President Donald Trump blamed the attack on "evil organizations of terror" and "thuggish ideology", calling it a "merciless slaughter" that "grieves our hearts and tears at our souls."

In Israel, Tel Aviv-Yafo municipality building displayed red, white, black and golden hues on Saturday night as it was lit up in solidarity with Egypt.

In Dubai, the UAE commemorated the attacks by lighting up the Burj Khalifa in Egyptian flag colors and the Eagle of Saladin.

In Paris, the Eiffel Tower's lights were turned off on 27 May as a sign of solidarity, at the request of Mayor Anne Hidalgo.

The Ministry of Foreign Affairs of Guatemala, reaffirms its strong condemnation of any act contrary to respect for life, peaceful coexistence and human rights and reiterates its commitment and support to the Arab Republic of Egypt in the fight against intolerance and terrorism in all its forms. The Government of the Republic of Guatemala expresses its solidarity with the People and Government of the Arab Republic of Egypt, especially the families of the victims and expresses its hope for the prompt recovery of the wounded.

== See also ==
- 2018 Minya bus attack
- 2011 Alexandria bombing
- 2011 Imbaba church attacks
- Botroseya Church bombing
- Christianity in Egypt
- Coptic Orthodox Church
- Kosheh massacres
- Nag Hammadi massacre
- Persecution of Copts
