= Minya bus attack =

Minya bus attack may refer to:

- 2017 Minya bus attack
- 2018 Minya bus attack
