= Islamic State – Egypt Province =

Branch of the Islamic State

- الدولة الإسلامية – ولاية مصر
- Other name: Islamic State – Misr Province
- Dates active: 2015 – present
- Active regions: Mainland Egypt
- Ideology: Islamic Statism
- Size: Unknown
- Part of: Islamic State

The Islamic State – Egypt Province (Arabic: الدولة الإسلامية – ولاية مصر, romanized: ad-Dawla al-Islāmiyya – Wilāyat Miṣr) is one of the two Islamic State (IS) branches in Egypt, the other being Islamic State – Sinai Province. It is located in mainland (African) Egypt, while the Sinai Province operates in the Sinai Peninsula.

== Background ==
Since 2013, violence in mainland Egypt has escalated and developed into a low-level Islamist insurgency against the Egyptian government.

== Attacks ==
On 20 August 2015, the Islamic State claimed responsibility for the bombings in Cairo and Giza, injuring thirty people.

On 11 December 2016, a suicide bomber killed 29 people and injured 47 others at St. Peter and St. Paul's Church, a chapel next to Saint Mark's Coptic Orthodox Cathedral, seat of the Coptic Orthodox Pope, in Cairo's Abbasia district. IS claimed responsibility for the attack.

On 29 February 2017, the group released a propaganda video that targets Coptic Christians.

On 29 December 2017, in Helwan, Egypt, a gunman opened fire at the Coptic Orthodox Church of Saint Menas and a nearby shop owned by a Coptic man, killing ten citizens and a police officer and injuring around ten people. The gunman was wounded by police and arrested. Investigators said he had carried out several attacks in the last year. Later, Amaq News Agency attributed it to the Islamic State group.

On 2 November 2018, three buses left Monastery of Saint Samuel the Confessor carrying Coptic Christians on their way to Minya. The buses were ambushed by IS fighters around Minya. During the ambush, the first two buses managed to escape with 12 injured passengers, however the third bus was unable to escape the ambush and was forced to come to a stop. Seven civilians on board the bus were killed.
