= Maspero demonstrations =

Demonstrations against the destruction of a church in Egypt

Maspero demonstration
- Part of the Egyptian Crisis under the SCAF
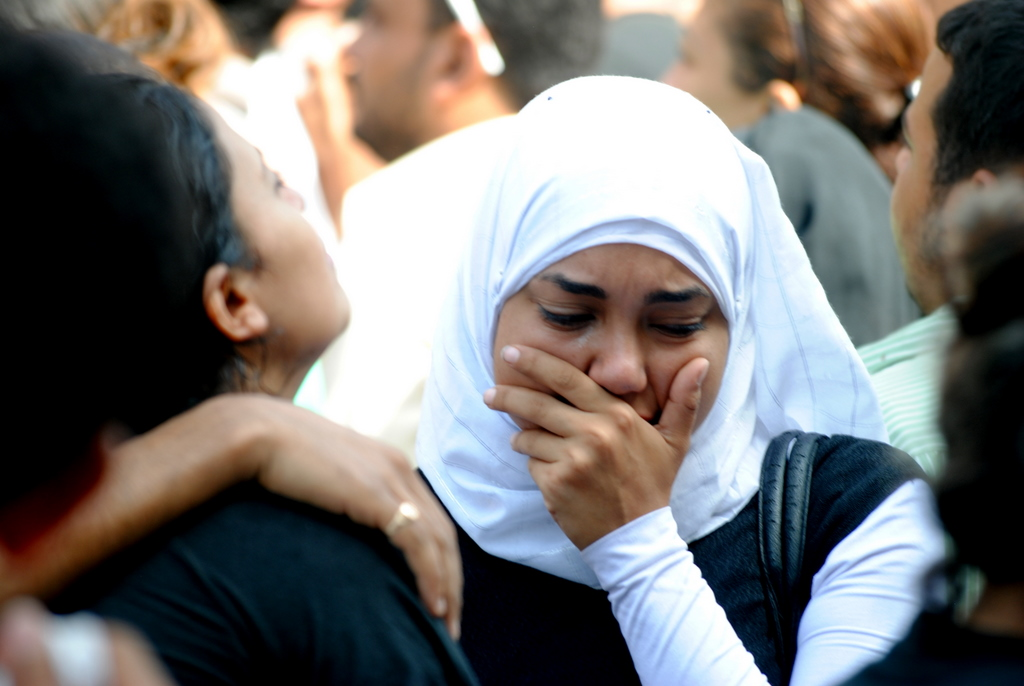
- Location: Maspiro, Cairo, Egypt
- Date: 9–10 October 2011
- Target: Coptic Christians
- Deaths: 24
- Injuries: 212
- Perpetrators: Supreme Council of the Armed Forces, Egyptian Armed Forces

The Maspero demonstrations began in October 2011 by a group dominated by Egyptian Copts in reaction to the demolition of a church in Upper Egypt claimed to be built without the appropriate license. The peaceful protesters who intended to stage a sit-in in front of the Maspiro television building were attacked by security forces and the army, resulting in 24 deaths, mostly among the Coptic protestors, and 212 injuries, most of which were sustained by Copts.

== Demonstration ==
The peaceful protesters gathered in peaceful chants, angered by a statement made publicly by Aswan's governor, Mustafa Kamel el-Sayyed, who, after the destruction of the church in Aswan, denied the existence of the church, and then later retracted his statements, and claimed instead that the construction of the church was illegal. It was later revealed that extremist followers of the Salafist Islamic sect had pronounced threats and made demands for Aswan's Christian congregation not to have any loudspeakers in the church and to limit the visibility of any Christian symbols such as crosses on the church structure. In order to defuse tensions, the Aswan governorate organized a meeting between Salafist and Coptic leaders, wherein the Copts refused the latter demand of eliminating crosses and steeples. The threats eventually escalated to actual destruction of the church by the extremists, and to the subsequent statements by the Aswan governor. It was this incident that led to the protest, which is presented in the following details based on a number of credible sources.

The march set out towards Maspiro from the downtown poverty-stricken neighborhood of Shubra, densely populated by both Muslims and Christians. Reporters agree that it was a sizeable demonstration comparable to the numbers at the 28 January protest, the day when Mubarak sent army vehicles to confront protesters. Protesters were also angry about an injury sustained by a Christian priest during the violent confrontation by army and police at Wednesday's demonstration at Maspiro, when a smaller group had been demonstrating against the situation in Aswan.

When the protests started, Egyptian state television anchor Rasha Magdy, urged "honorable" citizens to go "protect" the military.

== Clashes ==
Reports suggest that the army began using violence even before the protesters reached Maspiro. Gunshots were heard from the end of Shubra Street and rocks were thrown from a nearby bridge. The protesters responded in chants against the Field Commander. The attacks suddenly stopped as the protesters proceeded on Galaa Street. As they crossed the Al Ahram headquarters, one rock was thrown at the building. Reports suggest this was in response to Al Ahram's poor coverage of violence against Copts in a recent issue.

Army attacks resumed when the protesters turned the corner at Ramsis Hotel and reached Maspiro. Witnesses saw two armored personnel carriers crushing protesters to death, and soldiers firing wildly at the congregation, followed by riot police throwing tear gas. These incidents have been documented by video and later broadcast on CNN. Reports count between 24 and 27 deaths, mostly Coptic civilians, and over 300 injured.

State television within minutes of violence first reported the death of three soldiers and requested that all noble Egyptian patriots protect the military against the "violent crowd of Copts," also alluding to "foreign infiltrators" inciting violence. That evening, state television continued to broadcast a manipulated version of the story claiming the protesters were armed and that a "conflict" had broken out between civilians and military personnel with riot police, leaving deaths and injuries on both sides. Later, the Department of Health released another statement indicating that there were no military deaths and associating all bodies with deceased civilian protesters.

== Response ==
According to an official statement by the Egyptian military, it was the protesters who first attacked the army resulting in the death of three police officers. They claim to have responded by firing blank cartridges, and that military personnel were being pulled out of their armoured vehicles and attacked by rioters, which they claim caused other military personnel to panic and "mow down" some protesters "accidentally" as they drove off. Human rights organisations have dismissed the Army's response as partial.

Several international media outlets, including BBC and CNN, picked up this version of the events. Egyptian state television later retracted the claims when it broadcast a mild report on the events the following day but continued to exhibit a reluctance to condemn the actions of the army. Egypt's Minister of Information Osama Heikal blamed the reports on the "emotional distress" the states news anchors went through over reports of Copts attacking the Egyptian army.

Public figures, including prominent Muslim and Coptic leaders, demanded the prosecution of army generals. The military council then called for the civilian Prime Minister to investigate the incident and identified 15 suspects to be tried in military courts. The military council and state television remain targets of heated criticism from prominent activists and journalists. The representatives at the state television have not issued any statements, but a newscaster has publicly expressed feeling "ashamed" to be working for an institution that proved "itself to be a slave for whoever rules Egypt". Activists also blame state television for provoking sectarian tensions.

Governor Mustafa Kamel El Sayyed reportedly said that the demolition of the Church was agreed to by the local Coptic community and absolved himself of any responsibility in the tragic events at Maspiro. The Ministerial Cabinet announced it will amend laws pertaining to the construction of houses of worship and toughen the anti-discrimination laws, but local human rights activists doubt the effectiveness or follow-through of the Cabinet's approach.

Identical promises have been made following other similar incidents (recently and in the more distant past) without any amend the archaic laws that require only non-Muslims to receive permission to build houses of worship. In addition, the Egyptian military, which is responsible for these deaths, has taken over the investigation, prompting Human Rights Watch to issue a statement which concluded that "official denials suggest investigation will be flawed".

== See also ==
- 2011 Alexandria bombing
- 2011 Imbaba Church Attacks
- Human rights in Egypt under the Supreme Council of the Armed Forces
- List of massacres in Egypt
