= 1948 Cairo bombings =

Anti-Jewish attacks in Cairo, Egypt

- Part of 1948 Arab-Israeli War
- Location: Cairo, Kingdom of Egypt
- Date: June–September, 1948
- Target: Egyptian Jews
- Attack type: Bombings
- Deaths: 70 Jews killed
- Injuries: 200 wounded

The 1948 bombings in Cairo, which targeted Jewish areas, took place during the 1948 Arab–Israeli War, between June and September, and killed 70 Jews and wounded nearly 200. Riots claimed many more lives.

In a meeting with the American Jewish Committee in New York in October 1948, the president of Cairo's Sephardi Jewish community, Salvator Cicurel, stated his belief that "the recent anti-Jewish outbreaks...[were] connected with the existence of Israel and the defeats of the Egyptian Army there."

== The bombings ==
The first bomb was planted on June 20, 1948, in Harat Al-Yahud Al-Qara’In, the Karaite quarter of Cairo. 22 Jews were killed and 41 wounded. The bombing took place during the first truce phase of the 1948 Arab–Israeli War, and the authorities initially blamed the explosion on fireworks stored in Jewish homes and fighting between Karaite Jews and Rabbinic Jews.

=== Israeli bombing of Cairo ===
Four weeks later on July 15, three Israeli B-17s smuggled by the Mahal bombed a residential neighbourhood in Cairo during the Ramadan Iftar, killing many civilians and destroying many homes. A spontaneous demonstration march to the Jewish quarter took place following the attacks. Two days later the Egyptian authorities reported a potential Israeli bombing attack on Cairo, although it was a false alarm.

=== Further attacks on Jews in Cairo ===
A further two days after, on July 19, bombs exploded in the Jewish-owned Cicurel and Oreco department stores, and on July 28 and August 1 the Adès and Gattegno department stores were bombed.

On September 22, five days after the assassination of United Nations mediator Bernadotte in Jerusalem, 19 Jews were killed and 62 injured in an explosion in the Jewish quarter in Cairo.

On November 12, shortly after the Egyptian defeat in Operation Shmone a bomb destroyed the premises of the Société Orientale de Publicité, a large publishing and advertising firm.

== Aftermath ==
The government's response was muted due to the growing influence and strength of the Muslim Brotherhood in Egypt. In November 1948, following several bombings and assassination attempts, the government arrested 32 leaders of the Brotherhood's "secret apparatus" and banned the Brotherhood. At this time, the Brotherhood was estimated to have 2000 branches and 500,000 members or sympathisers. On December 8, 1948, Prime Minister Mahmoud an-Nukrashi Pasha officially dissolved the Society, and the state sequestered its considerable assets. In succeeding months Egypt's prime minister was assassinated by Brotherhood member, and following that Al-Banna himself was assassinated in what is thought to be a cycle of retaliation.

In a 1950 trial, members of the Society were charged with carrying out all the bombings against the Jews of Cairo from June to November 1948. The prosecution argued that the bombings were part of a strategy to exploit the issue of Palestine to destabilise and undermine the regime.

== See also ==
- 1945 Anti-Jewish riots in Egypt
- Helwan Riots
- 1948 Anti-Jewish riots in Tripolitania
- List of massacres in Egypt
