= August 2015 Egypt bombings =

Terrorist incident in Cairo and Giza, Egypt

- Location: Cairo and Giza, Egypt
- Date: 20 August 2015 early morning
- Injuries: 30
- Perpetrators: Islamic State; Egypt Province

The August 2015 Egypt bombings were a series of blasts on 20 August 2015 in Cairo and Giza, Egypt, possibly targeting state infrastructure.

== Details ==
In Cairo, reports suggest that some of the blasts occurred near a courthouse and a state security building. The building was partially destroyed and 20 nearby homes were damaged. Responsibility for the attack was claimed by the Islamic State of Iraq and the Levant. Islamic State of Iraq and Syria (ISIS) send out a bombing in August 2015 they found 29 people injured, not only were their citizens of Cairo injured but also six officers were wounded by the bombing, ISIS did take recognition for what they did.
