= Hamayouni Decree =

The Hamayouni Decree (also "Hamayonic", "Hamayoni") (Arabic: الخط الهمايونى) or "Hamayony Khat" is a clause in Egyptian law that placed protections for religious minorities, particularly the Copts. It included equality in employment, enlisting in the military, freedom to worship and allowing churches to address their own finances and several matters with their followers. The decree was part of the Ottoman Reform Edict of 1856 which sought to address inequalities between Muslim and non-Muslim citizens, mainly affecting the Coptic Christian minority. The law mandated that the Ottoman Sultan must issue permits for any construction or maintenance of churches, and the Coptic Pope had to apply for all such permits. After the end of Ottoman rule, only the king, and then the President of Egypt could issue these permits, although in 1999, under the administration of Hosni Mubarak, the law was changed to also allow Egyptian Governors to grant permits. The decree is often confused with the 1934 Ten Conditions of Al-Ezabi, which enlarged the restrictions and added ten limiting conditions. Although the original decree amended a ban on the construction of Coptic churches, today it is the subject of controversies over religious freedom.

== History and revisions ==
While ostensibly part of the Tanzimat reforms of the Ottoman Empire in the 1800s, the special restrictions on churches trace back to the Pact of Umar in the 7th century. This treaty included a provision against the building of new churches or other religious buildings, and became the jurisprudential basis for subsequent interactions between Muslim leaders and non-Muslim citizens.

== See also ==
- Hatt-ı Hümayun
- Tanzimat
- Ten Conditions of Al-Ezabi
- Copts
