= 2015 Wahat convoy incident =

The 2015 Wahat convoy incident was an incident which occurred on September 13, 2015, in which Egyptian security forces killed eight Mexican tourists and four Egyptian guides in the Western Desert after allegedly mistaking them for terrorists.

== Background ==
The incident occurred as the group was spotted near an oasis in the Western Desert, when a joint police and army unit fired upon them. Ten injuries occurred in addition to the twelve deaths, after the group was confused to be part of terrorist activity in the region. The incident occurred the same day that the Islamic State of Iraq and the Levant stated that they were now active in the region, which has become lawless following multiple government overthrows in the region.
