= Imbaba =

Imbaba إمبابة
- Neighborhood
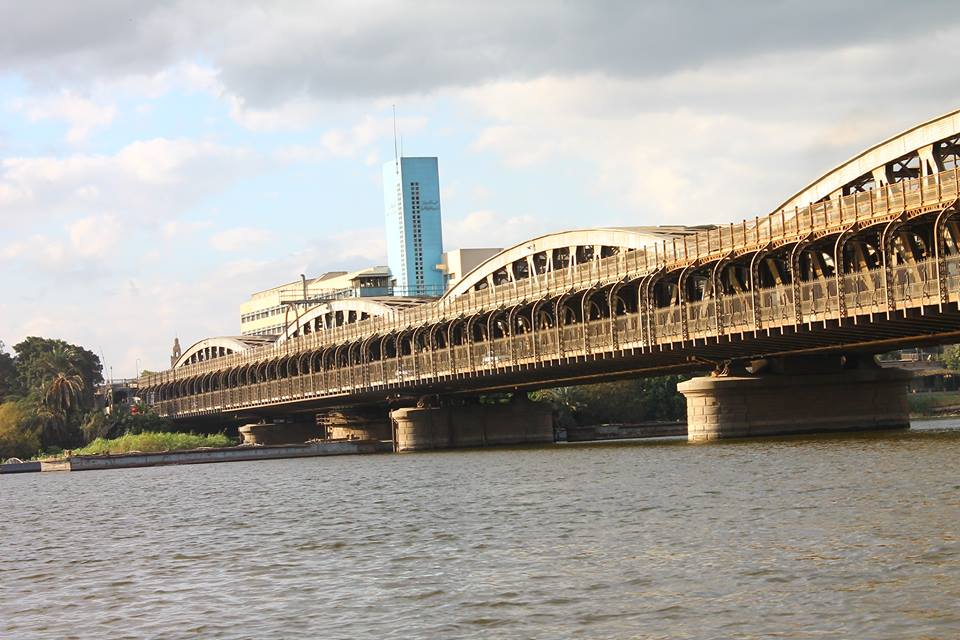
- Imbaba bridge in 2015

- Location in Egypt
- Coordinates: 30°5′33″N 31°12′2″E
- Country: Egypt
- Governorate: Giza Governorate

Area
  - Total: 8.28 km^{2} (3.20 sq mi)

Population
  - Total: 1,465,875
  - Density: 177,000/km^{2} (459,000/sq mi)
- approximately
- Time zone: UTC+2 (EET)
  - Summer (DST): UTC+3 (EEST)
- Postal code: 12651

Imbaba (Arabic: إمبابة Imbāba, IPA: [emˈbæːbæ]) is a working-class neighbourhood in northern Giza, Egypt, located west of the Nile and northwest of and near Gezira Island and downtown Cairo, within the Giza Governorate. The district is located in the historic upper Nile Delta, and is part of the Greater Cairo metropolitan area. Imbaba is the most densely populated city subdivision in the world.

Imbaba is also the name of an adjacent administrative centre (مركز) in rural Giza Governorate, which has 18 villages in its jurisdiction.

== Etymology ==
The origin of the name Imbaba is not certain. Imbaba (ዕምባባ) pronounced exactly as it is in Egypt, is also a word in the Tigrinya language spoken in Eritrea and the Tigray province in northern Ethiopia and means flower. Some sources claim that it comes from the Amharic word for African fan palm (Amharic: ዘምባባ, romanized: zembaba) and that the area was called so by Ethiopian camel merchants and herders to describe the place where they met to do business.

However, the fan palm does not grow in Egypt and older versions of the name that do not correspond to the Amharic word are attested – Nababa (Arabic: نبابة) and Ambuba (Arabic: امبوبه).

== History ==
For centuries Imbaba was the final destination for camels brought from as far as Sudan and the Horn of Africa, to be sold in the village's Friday market. The market still exists, but is no longer as important as it was up to the turn of the 20th century due to increasing urbanisation.

A map created by the General Authority for Physical Planning in 2012, shows details of areas within Imbaba which were unplanned, and that at the time, were considered unsafe. Imbaba is densely populated.

Pigeon breeding is a favorite activity of some of the neighborhood residents with access to rooftops.

=== Battle of the Pyramids ===
The Battle of the Pyramids, also known as the Battle of Embabeh, was a battle fought on July 21, 1798, between the French army in Egypt under Napoleon Bonaparte, and local Mamluk forces. It occurred during France's Egyptian Campaign and was the battle where Napoleon put into use one of his significant contributions to tactics, the massive divisional square. Napoleon named the battle after the Egyptian pyramids, although they were only faintly visible on the horizon when the battle took place.

=== Siege of Imbaba ===
In late 1992, the "Islamic Group" (al-Gama'a al-Islamiyya) expanded its influence in parts of Imbaba. In November, the group purportedly announced the establishment of the "Emirate of Imbaba" (some accounts claim that foreign news media coined the term, not the group itself). This challenge to the sovereignty of the Egyptian state triggered the siege of Imbaba, beginning on December 8. In its course, the government deployed over 12,000 police and state Security forces, along with one hundred personnel carriers and bulldozers, all of which put an end to the Emirate.

== Imbaba's districts ==
- Madinat Al-Umal
- Bashtil
- Madinat Al-Tahrir
- Al-Muniera
- Ard Al-Gameya

== Notable people ==
- Ali El Haggar – singer
- Mohamed Henedi – actor
- Ibrahim Youssef – soccer player
- Ismail Youssef – soccer player
- Mohamed Esmat – aviation industry

== See also ==
- 2011 Imbaba church attacks
