= Helwan riots (1945) =

- Date: 1945
- Location: Helwan, Egypt

The Helwan riots were protests by South African soldiers in Helwan, Egypt over their housing conditions and treatment while being repatriated at the conclusion of the Second World War. Property damage in the range of millions of Pounds sterling was caused to local businesses, but after placating the unhappy soldiers, they were repatriated to South Africa.

== History ==
=== Background ===
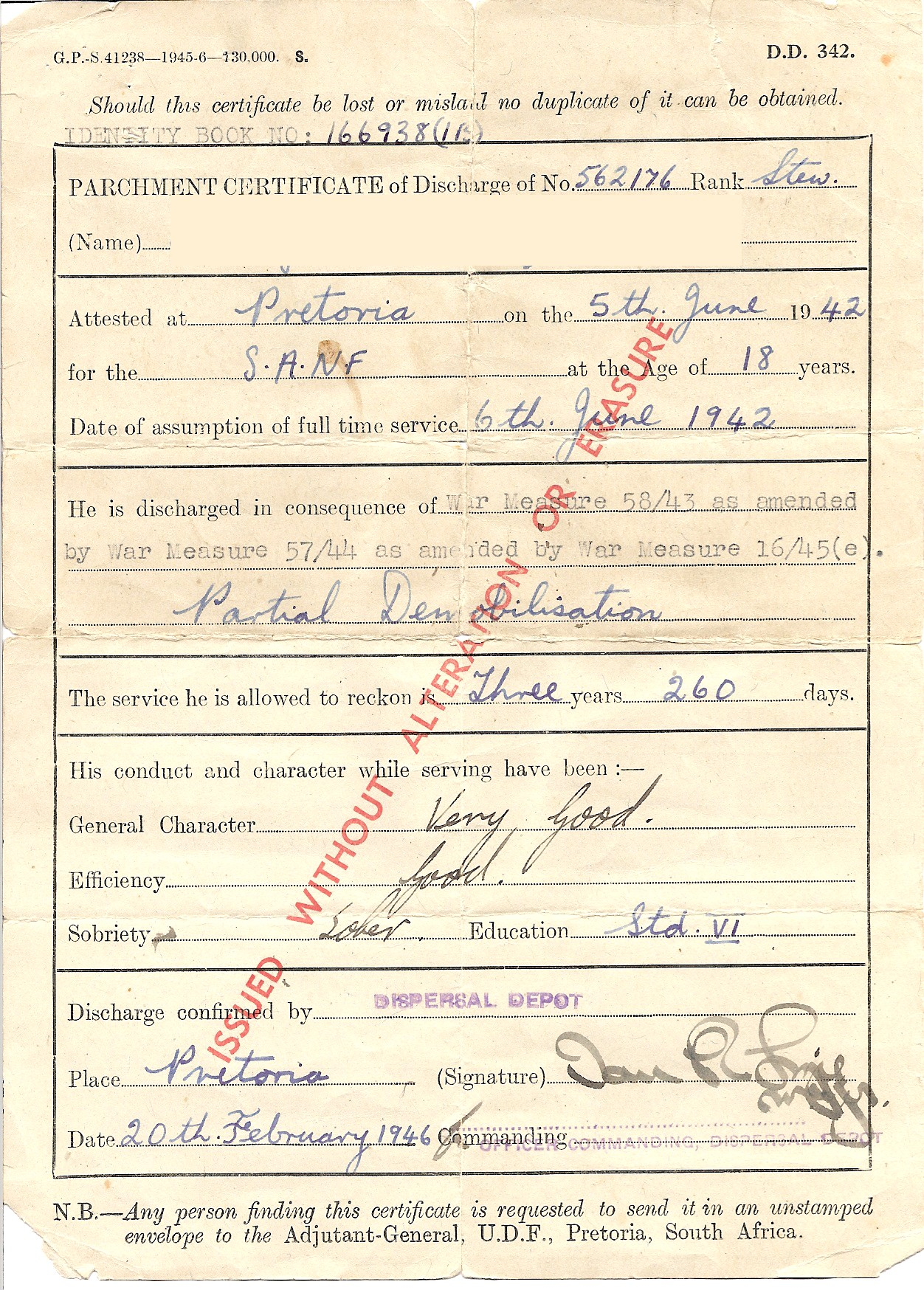
South African demobilisation certificate

By the beginning of April 1945, it had become obvious that the war was coming to a close and that the 6th South African Armoured Division as well as many other South African troops serving as divisional, corps and army troops would require transportation back to South Africa for demobilisation. On 1 May, the Union Defence Force realised that no plans had yet been made to get all men back and instructions were prepared, whereby No. 1 and 5 Wings of the South African Air Force (SAAF) were to be merged to form No. 4 Group. This Group was to be used in an Intensified Transport Service/Shuttle Service to move 5,000 troops per month by air commencing 1 July 1945.

A further 15,000 men were to be transported home by sea during the second half of the year, resulting in the repatriation of 45,000 soldiers by the end of the year. In addition to the 6th South African Armoured Division and other troops in Italy, there were thousands of recently released South African prisoners of war who had been held in Italy. These men were from the 2nd South African Infantry Division and had been captured at the Sidi Rezegh and Tobruk battles in the western desert. Their numbers had not been factored into the demobilisation plans.

The staging depot at Helwan north of Cairo was soon overcrowded and by 20 August 1945, the depot, designed to hold 5,000 men was holding 9,000. An official announcement on 9 August stated that 3,000 to 5,000 men were expected to be repatriated by sea at the end of the month, but less than a week later it was announced that the expected shipping had been delayed, and that further announcements would be made later. Food was in short supply and the lack of adequate numbers of chefs caused extended queues and delays at meal times.

The standard of discipline deteriorated further as the men arriving at the depot were split up alphabetically by surname, and then according to their demobilisation categories (A, B, C, etc., based on their initial date of volunteering for service abroad). This meant that men were grouped together with fellow soldiers and NCOs whom they did not know and unit structures were lost.

Morale declined even further when it was decided that 500 volunteers would go home as a top priority to assist in the demobilisation process back in South Africa, their return home irrespective of their demobilisation category. In addition, all trading rights except those of the NAAFI were controlled by Egyptians; the men felt that they were being exploited by inflated prices charged by these traders. There was also unhappiness over the two cinemas, when men who had bought tickets frequently found that they were unable to get in due to a lack of space.

=== Trouble ===
A protest meeting was held on 20 August where a crowd of 1,500 men was addressed by various individuals. As the size of the crowd increased, the meeting became violent. The usually disciplined soldiers became a mob bent on trashing, looting and burning and their first objectives were the two Egyptian-owned cinemas which were set alight. The mob then split up and further Egyptian premises, blocks of shops, motor cars, bungalows and book stalls were set alight. They also set fire to one of their own messes and broke down and looted the NAAFI store.

Major General Evered Poole of the 6th Armoured Division, flew in from Italy to address the troops, promising that immediate steps were to be taken to speed up the rate of repatriation. To tighten up on discipline and improve morale at Helwan, the housing of troops on a unit basis was instituted and a brigadier was appointed to command the depot. A public address system was installed to keep everybody in camp up to date on the latest news and free outdoor film shows were implemented.

On 26 August, the Director General Officer - Administration (DGQ-A Italy & Egypt), appointed a court of enquiry to investigate; their report detailed the frustration and despondency related to overcrowding which had been one major contributing factor, as had the failure of the airlift to repatriate the published number of troops per day. The first official statements on 24 and 31 May declared that the repatriation rate by air would be 500 a day.

From 1 July, this figure was amended to 300 a day. The average daily number of men repatriated during the first twenty days of July was only 108. The court assessed the total cost of the damage at £22,768,431. By 25 January 1946, 101,676 men had been ferried back to South Africa. The last aircraft left Egypt on 26 February 1946 including Major General Poole; it arrived in Durban on 2 March 1946.

There were reports that the South African Government suppressed the news of these events and that they were prohibited from being published in local press reports.
