= Nag Hammadi massacre =

Massacre of Coptic Christians in Egypt in 2010

Nag Hammadi Massacre
- Location: 26°3′12.3″N 32°14′36.7″E; Nag Hammadi, Egypt
- Date: 6 January 2010
- Target: Coptic Christians
- Attack type: Shooting
- Deaths: 7
- Injuries: 9
- Perpetrator: Mohamed Ahmed Hussein

The Nag Hammadi massacre was a massacre of Coptic Christians carried out on the eve of 7 January 2010, in the Egyptian city of Nag Hammadi. The massacre occurred when Mohamed Hussein started shooting in front of the Nag Hammadi Cathedral, as Coptic Christians were leaving the church after celebrating the midnight Christmas Divine Liturgy. The massacre resulted in the murder of six Coptic Christians and one (1) police officer. Nine other Copts were confirmed to be wounded, and two Muslims were reportedly wounded in the attack. Egypt's Interior Ministry said it suspected the attack was motivated by the alleged rape by a Christian of a Muslim girl.

The Nag Hammadi massacre gained widespread international attention, and was condemned by Pope Benedict XVI, Lebanese MP Nadim Gemayel, Italian Foreign Minister Franco Frattini, and Canadian Foreign Minister Lawrence Cannon. The massacre was one of the most serious outbreaks of anti-Christian violence in Egypt, and the worst since the murder of 21 Coptic Christians in Kosheh in January 2000.

== Background ==
Coptic Christians form the largest religious minority in Egypt, and represent between 15% and 20% of a population of over 100 million Egyptians. Estimates of the size of Egypt's Christian population vary from the low government figures of 6 to 7 million to the 15 to 19 million reported by Christian leaders, though estimates vary (see Religion in Egypt). The Coptic community has been targeted by terrorism throughout the past by Islamic extremists, and has faced varying degrees of discriminatory government policies, such as restrictions on building churches and a school curriculum focused on Islam. Since the 1970s, the rise of Islamist movements in Egypt has led to sectarian violence. Disputes over land and inter-faith relationships have sometimes split communities along religious lines, and civil rights groups have criticized local authorities' handling of such cases. Police have been accused of delaying their response to reports of fighting and then simply arresting more Christians than Muslims. Criminal investigations are occasionally discontinued in favor of informal reconciliation meetings. Other forms of anti-Christian discrimination in Egypt include discrimination in hiring in the public sector and staff appointments to public universities and barring from certain jobs such as Arabic language teachers.

== Events ==
Bishop Kyrillos (Cyril), the Coptic Orthodox bishop of Nag Hammadi, had warned the Egyptian police that there had been threats in the days leading up to the Christmas Eve liturgy. For this reason, he decided to end his liturgy one hour earlier than normal. He told the Associated Press that, for days, he had expected something to happen on Christmas Eve. He said he left the church minutes before the attack, and had to take the back door when a suspiciously driven car swerved near him. Seconds later he heard the mayhem and machine-gun fire.

As the Christian worshipers were leaving the Nag Hammadi Cathedral after the Christmas Eve Divine Liturgy, a car pulled up and gunfire was sprayed into the crowd. As a result, eight Copts, all aged between 15 and 23, were killed. Six died immediately, while two more died the following day from severe wounds. One Muslim bystander was also killed in the attack. Nine other Copts were confirmed wounded, and two Muslims were reportedly wounded in the attack.

== Aftermath ==
On 8 January 2010, three men from the Berber tribe of Al-Hawara were arrested and charged with premeditated murder in association with the Nag Hammadi massacre. The three accused were Mohamed Ahmed Hassanein, more commonly known as Hamam el-Kamouny, Qurshi Abul Haggag and Hendawi Sayyed. The trial opened on 13 February 2010. Despite initially confessing to the police, they pleaded not guilty to the charges of premeditated murder, putting lives of citizens at risk, and damaging property. The Supreme State Security Court adjourned the trial until 20 March 2010, and the trial was subsequently delayed twelve times. The accused men appeared in court for the final verdict on 16 January 2011. El-Kamouny received a death sentence for the "premeditated murder" of seven people, as well as for the "attempted murder" of the nine others who were wounded. The other two defendants were sentenced on 20 February 2011.

== Motives ==
Egyptian officials suspected that the shooting may have been "in revenge for the alleged rape of a 12-year-old girl from the Berber tribe of Al-Hawara by a Coptic man" in the nearby town of Farshout in November, which at the time led to five days of riots and attacks on Christian businesses and properties in Upper Egypt. A man was arrested and charged with the alleged rape on 21 November 2009.

== Egyptian reaction ==
Following the Nag Hammadi massacre and the associated attacks, the Egyptian police raided the homes of Coptic Christian families in Nag Hammadi on 10 January 2010, and arrested 22 young Copts, most of whom were teenagers. These Copts were detained at the Nag Hammadi police station for a few days, then transferred to jail in the isolated New Valley Governorate. None of the arrested Copts was ever formally charged with any crime.

It was not until two weeks after the massacre that President Hosni Mubarak made his first remarks directly condemning what happened. He stated that "The criminal act in Nag Hammadi has made the hearts of Egyptians bleed, whether Copts or Muslims".

The Egyptian Initiative for Personal Rights (EIPR) condemned the attack, stating that despite warnings by local church authorities of possible violence during the Coptic holiday, police had not increased security for Christmas.

On 9 January 2010, hundreds of people in Cairo demonstrated, carrying placards condemning "the shocking silence of the authorities" and stating "We are All Copts". On the same day, Egyptian police arrested 20 people who demonstrated in the town of Bahgura against the Nag Hammadi massacre.

On 15 January, 29 Egyptian human rights activists, bloggers, and members of political parties visited Nag Hammadi in order to show solidarity with the Coptic community against the recent attacks on Coptic civilians. All 29 activists were arrested by Egyptian police while on their way to pay their condolences to the families of the victims. The group included prominent activists such as Wael Abbas, members of 6 April Youth Movement, and members of the Democratic Front Party. The group included eight women, one of whom was a French citizen. The activists were detained and interrogated by the prosecutor of the Qena Governorate. A number of them were charged with demonstrating illegally, chanting slogans against the state, and causing disorder. Group members denied these allegations, stating that Egyptian police arrested them when they arrived at the train station, and that the group had not had time to engage in any activities.

== International reaction ==
The Nag Hammadi massacre gained widespread international attention, and was condemned by Pope Benedict XVI, Lebanese MP Nadim Gemayel, Italian foreign minister Franco Frattini, and Canadian foreign minister Lawrence Cannon.

The actions of the Egyptian government in the aftermath of the crime were also strongly condemned by Sarah Leah Whitson, the Middle East director of Human Rights Watch. "The Egyptian authorities should be focusing on the causes of the tragic shooting of six Coptic Christians," she stated. "Instead, they're arresting activists whose efforts to express their condolences is an important step toward healing sectarian fractures."

== See also ==
- List of massacres in Egypt
- Persecution of Copts
- Christianity in Egypt
- 2011 Alexandria bombing
- 2011 Imbaba Church Attacks
