= Ten Conditions of Al-Ezabi =

The legal foundation for the Egyptian state's control of church property was the Ottoman Hamayouni Decree of 1856. This decree sought to eliminate discrimination between citizens of different ethnicities and religions. Amongst other things, it gave Christians the right to construct places of worship by requiring them to submit a request to the Sultan.

After Egypt gained its independence, the Hamayouni Decree was modified in 1934 by the Deputy Minister of the Interior, Al-Ezabi Pacha in the Al-Ezabi Decree. This comprised a set of 10 conditions which had to be met before any application was presented to the President for approval. These vague criteria include taking into account objections from local Muslims, the distance between the proposed church and the nearest mosque, the number of Christians in the area and whether or not the proposed church is near the Nile, public utility or railway. Human rights monitors have stated that the conditions of the decree are in contradiction with the 1971 constitution. The Al-Ezabi "amplification" has, in reality, served to hinder Christians and other religious minorities from maintaining and building places of worship.

Regarding repairs to church property, progress has been made over the past few years following considerable national and international criticism of the decree. In January 1998, an amendment was made which delegated presidential authority to issue permits for church renovation to the country's 26 provincial governors. On December 28, 1999, President Mubarak decreed that church repairs no longer required a presidential, governor's or federal ministry permit. Instead, the repair of all places of worship was to be subject to a 1976 civil construction code, symbolically placing the repair of mosques and churches on equal footing before the law.
