= St. Peter and St. Paul's Church, Cairo =

St. Peter and St. Paul's Church
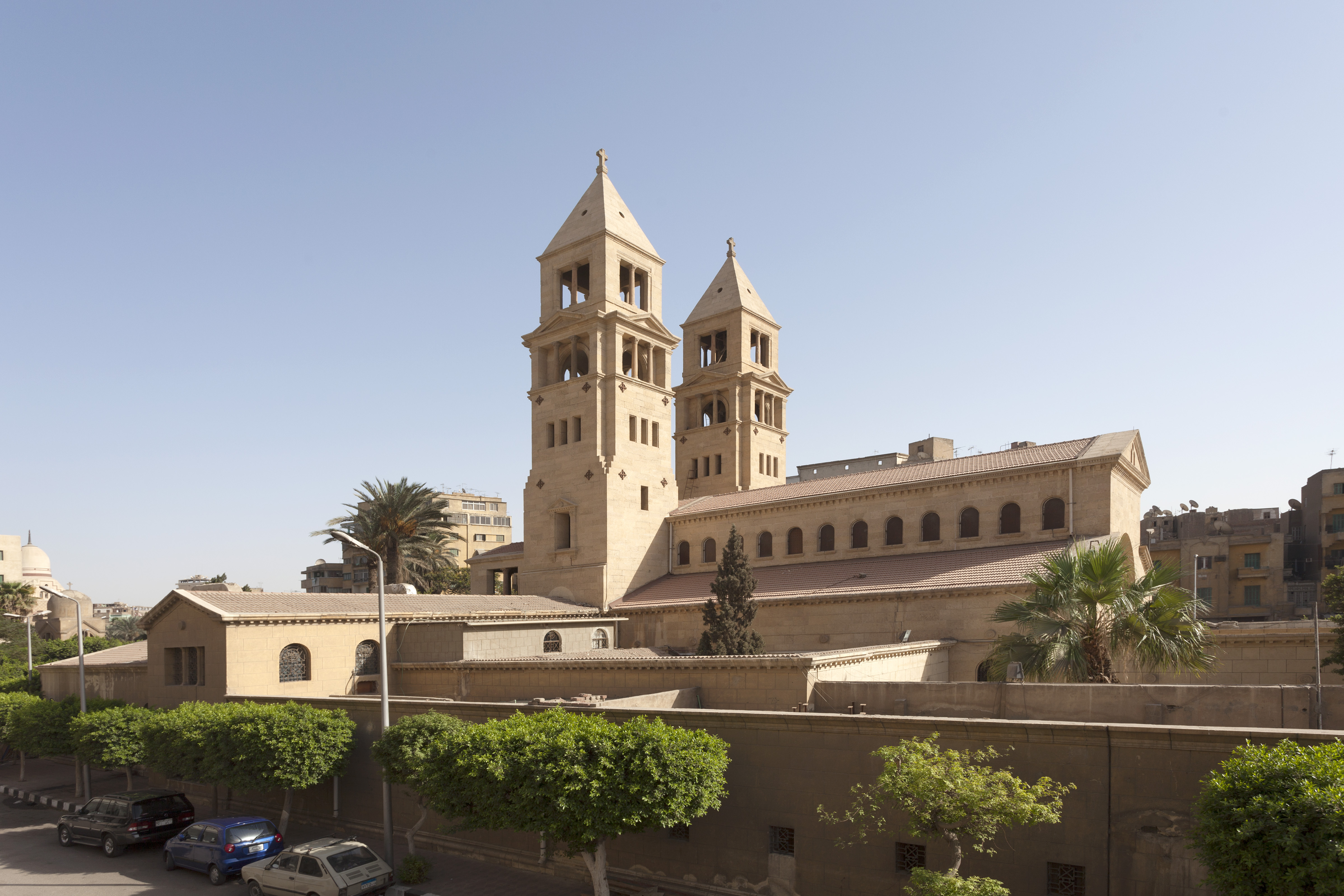
- St. Peter and St. Paul's Church
- 30.0722°N 31.2756°E
- Location: Cairo
- Country: Egypt
- Denomination: Coptic Orthodox
- Tradition: Alexandrian Rite

History
- Dedication: Saint Peter and Saint Paul
- Consecrated: 1911

Architecture
- Architect: Antonio Lasciac
- Style: Basilica
- Completed: 1911

St. Peter and St. Paul's Church (Arabic: الكنيسة البطرسية, romanized: al-Kanīsa al-Buṭrusiyya), commonly known as El-Botroseya and also known as the Petrine Church, is a small Coptic church located in the vicinity of Saint Mark's Coptic Orthodox Cathedral, the seat of the Pope of the Coptic Orthodox Church of Alexandria, in Cairo's Abbassia district. It was built in 1911 over Egyptian prime minister Boutros Ghali's tomb.

== History ==
The church was built in 1911 over the tomb of Boutros Ghali, Egypt's prime minister from 1908 until his assassination in 1910. Its building process was supervised by Ghali's family. His grandson, Boutros Boutros Ghali, sixth Secretary-General of the United Nations and former Egyptian minister of foreign affairs, was also buried in the crypt beneath the altar in February 2016. Originally named Saint Peter and Saint Paul's Church, it became known over the years as the Botroseya Church, the first church to be named after a political family.

On 11 December 2016, a suicide bomber blew himself up at the church, killing 29 people, mostly women and children, and injuring many others.

== Design ==
The church is considered by local historians to be of high religious and artistic value. It was designed in the basilica style by Italo-Slovene architect Antonio Lasciac, Khedive Isma'il Pasha's designated chief architect, with 28 meters in length and 17 meters in width. The central nave is separated from the aisles by a row of marbled columns on each side, above which are a series of Italian paintings depicting the life of Jesus, his apostles and a number of saints. At the end of the central aisle is a two-step plate of black marble containing Boutros Ghali's supposed final words. Venetian mosaics can be found on the walls, including one depicting the baptism of Jesus on the Jordan River, and another one behind the sanctuary showing Jesus above a dome, with the Virgin Mary to his right and Mark the Evangelist to his left.

== Gallery ==
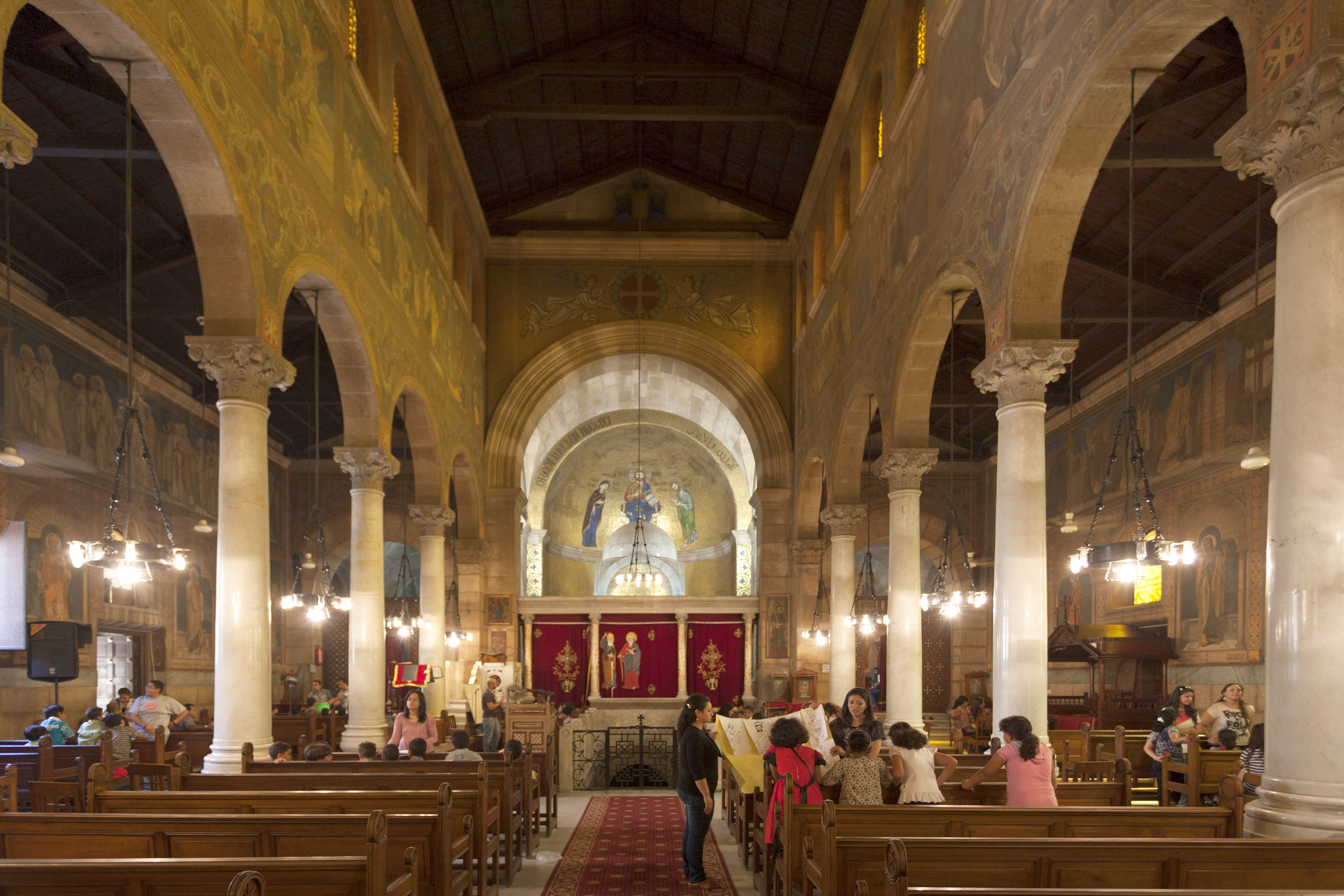
Nave of the church

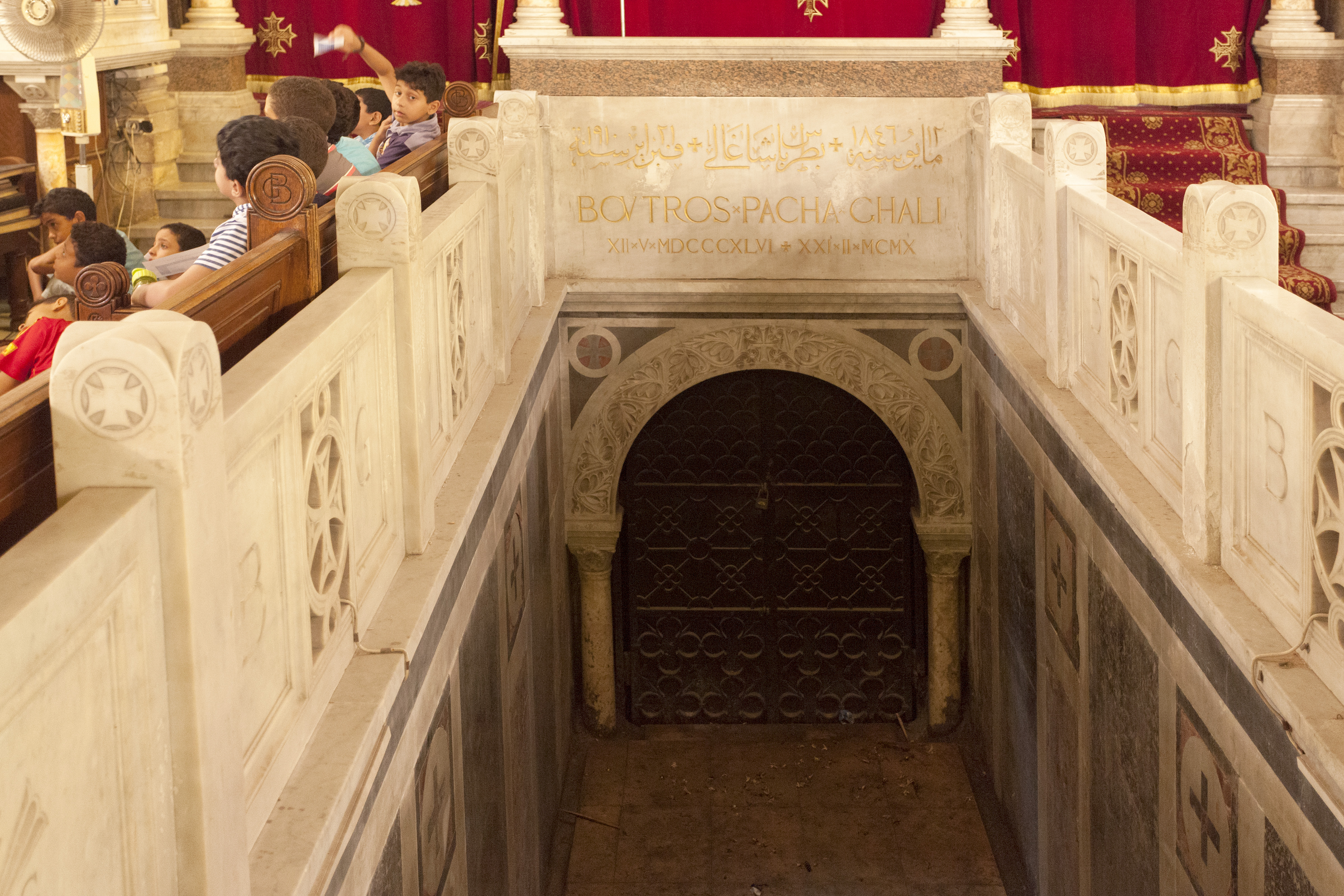
entrance to the crypt where Boutros Ghali's tomb is located
