= Botroseya Church bombing =

Suicide bombing on 11 December 2016 inside a Coptic church in Cairo, Egypt

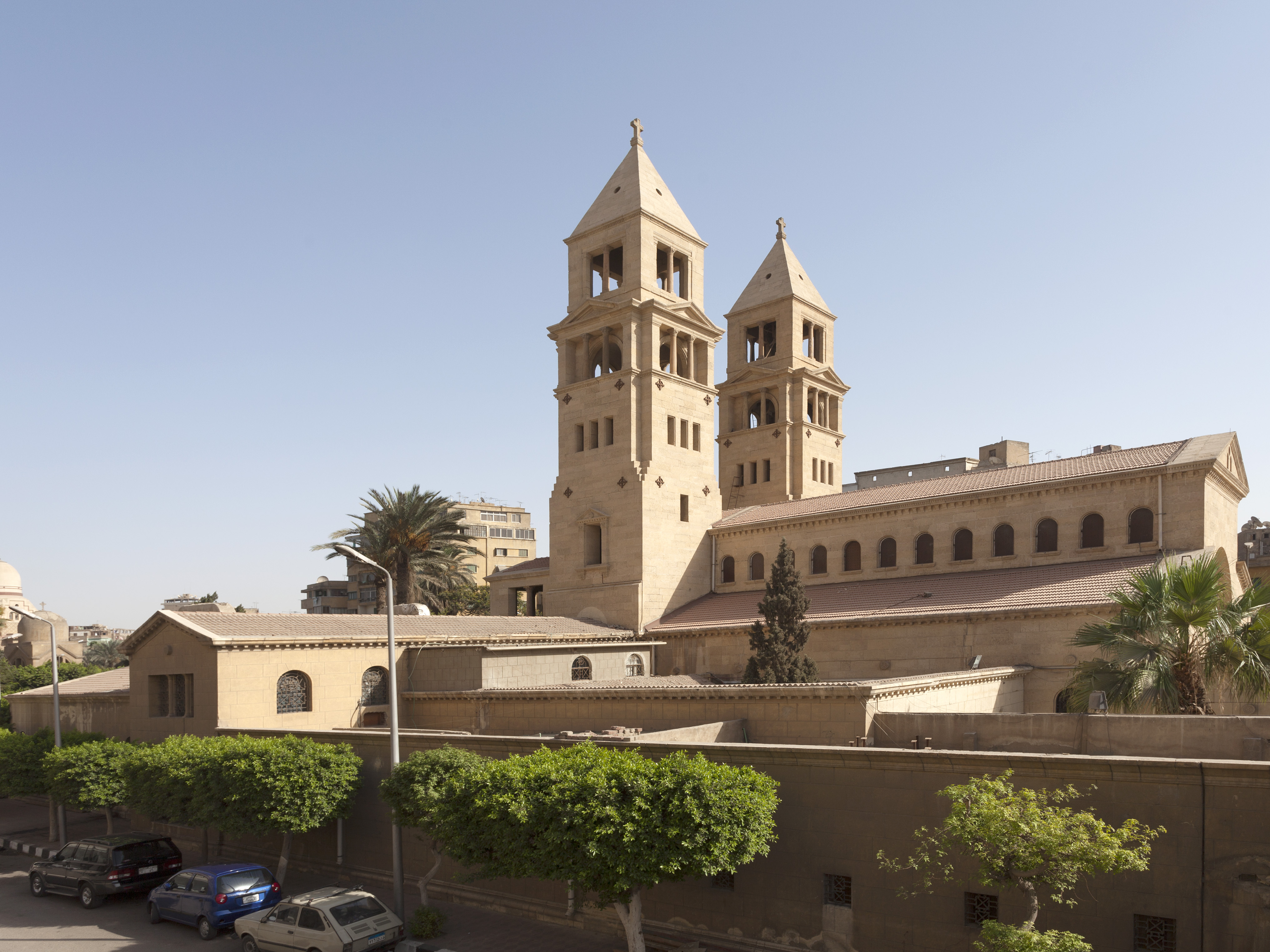
- Church of SS. Peter and Paul in September 2010
- Location: Abbassia, Cairo, Egypt
- Date: 11 December 2016; 9 years ago 10:00 (UTC+02:00)
- Target: Coptic Christians
- Attack type: Bombing
- Weapon: Suicide vest
- Deaths: 29
- Injuries: 47
- Perpetrators: Islamic State; Egypt Province
- Assailant: Mahmoud Shafiq Mohammed Mustafa

Martyrs of Botroseya Church

Martyrs
- Died: 11 December 2016
- Venerated in: Coptic Orthodox Church
- Feast: February 15 (Amshir 8)

On 11 December 2016, a suicide bomber killed 29 people and injured 47 others at St. Peter and St. Paul's Church (commonly known as El-Botroseya Church), a chapel next to Saint Mark's Coptic Orthodox Cathedral, seat of the Coptic Orthodox Pope, in Cairo's Abbasia district. Egypt's president, Abdel Fattah el-Sisi identified the bomber as 22-year-old Mahmoud Shafiq Mohammed Mustafa, who had worn a suicide vest. el-Sisi reported that three men and a woman have been arrested in connection with the attack; two others are being sought. ISIS claimed responsibility for the attack.

== Bombing ==
The explosion occurred at around 10:00 am on 11 December 2016 in Cairo's Abbassia district. The MENA news agency initially reported that an assailant had planted a device in a chapel near the church compound's premises. Security officials did not know at that time whether it was a suicide bombing or a remotely activated device, which they believed would have been a large one.

The device reportedly contained 12 kilograms (26 lb) of TNT. An unnamed church source told a Nile TV reporter that the bomb was thrown inside the cathedral's hall, adjacent to the entrance of the building.

St Mark's Cathedral is constantly patrolled by security personnel. While security officials did not know the bomber's gender, some media organizations speculated that the assailant was a woman since most victims were women and children.

== Aftermath ==
Roads leading to the site were blocked after security forces arrived. They cordoned off the area and started inspecting the church compound and its security cameras. The health ministry sent fourteen ambulances to the scene to assist the injured.

The casualties were taken to the nearby Demerdash and Dar al-Shifa hospitals. The government placed Cairo International Airport and the city's transport system on alert, a measure which included a state of emergency in Cairo's subway network, tightening security protocols at each station's gates. Prime Minister Sherif Ismail and Cairo's security chief, General Khaled Abdel-Aal, visited the scene. The prosecutor general, Nabil Ahmed Sadeq, ordered the Homeland Security department to carry out an investigation.

Cabinet spokesman Ashraf Sultan described the incident as a "terrorist" attack, and denied certain media reports about Interior Minister Magdy Abdel Ghaffar's alleged resignation, stating that Ghaffar had just attended a ministerial meeting to discuss the incident. Sultan also stressed the need for media figures to exercise caution while covering the events. The Interior Ministry said that it was investigating members of the police unit that was assigned to the church complex.

On 26 December 2016 Egypt's Army Corps of Engineers stated they had completed 80% of the renovations at the church and were hoping to have the church ready for 7 January, when Coptic Christians celebrate the Nativity.

== Perpetrators ==
President Abdel Fattah el-Sisi on 12 December, identified the bomber as 22-year-old Mahmoud Shafiq Mohammed Mustafa. el-Sisi reported that three men and a woman have been arrested in connection with the attack; two others are being sought. On 13 December, the Islamic State of Iraq and the Levant claimed responsibility in Amaq News Agency. However, an Interior Ministry official, police Maj. Gen. Tarek Attia, said that the suicide bomber had been arrested in 2014 in Fayoum province, southwest of Cairo, on charges of being a member of the outlawed Muslim Brotherhood.

Mahmoud Shafiq Mohamed Mostafa, the man identified by Egyptian authorities as the perpetrator of the St. Peter and St. Paul church bombing was reportedly arrested in 2014 in Hawatem Square in Fayoum along with a colleague, according to lawyer Yasmine Hossam al-Din, who represented him at the time.

President Abdel Fattah al-Sisi announced that Mostafa bombed the Cairo church on Sunday using an explosive belt, in his speech at the official state funeral for the victims of the explosion on Monday afternoon.

Hossam al-Din, who represented Mostafa during his trial in 2014, said he happened to be in the vicinity of a Muslim Brotherhood protest in Fayoum when he was arrested and subsequently charged with protesting without a permit, arms possession and joining a banned group.

Mostafa was reportedly subjected to severe torture during his interrogations, resulting in a broken nose, according to Hossam al-Din.

A year after his arrest, in May 2015, the prosecution dropped charges of arms possession and joining a banned organization, but upheld accusations of protesting without a permit, meaning the case was categorized as a misdemeanor rather than a felony. Fayoum Criminal Court, headed by Atef Rizk, ordered his release in 2015, after Mostafa exceeded the maximum 6-month pretrial detention period for misdemeanors.

Security forces later arrested Mostafa's colleague, according to Hossam al-Din, and detained him pending investigations into another case in Beni Suef.

The Egyptian Interior Ministry produced a statement asserting that the Cairo attack was organized and carried out by terrorists led by Mohab Mostafa El-Sayed Kassem, which the Ministry said had links to Ansar Bait al-Maqdis, also known as Islamic State of Iraq and the Levant – Sinai Province. The ministry claimed that Egyptian Muslim Brotherhood fugitives in Qatar had provided financing and logistical support. However, both the Muslim Brotherhood and the government of Qatar have denied that they had any role in the bombing.

Mustafa once visited Qatar on 3 December 2015 but headed back to Cairo on 1 February 2016. He had never been detained by Qatari authorities.

By early 2017 eight suspects had been arrested for the bombing.

== Reactions ==
=== Egyptian ===
Abdel Fattah el-Sisi, the Egyptian President, said "Vicious terrorism is being waged against the country's Copts and Muslims. Egypt will emerge stronger and more united from this situation." Sisi also declared a national period of mourning for three days.

Pope Tawadros II of the Coptic Orthodox Church of Alexandria sought to heal any sectarian friction caused by the attack, saying it "is not just a disaster for the Church but a disaster for the whole nation." Tawadros cut short his trip to Greece and arrived in Cairo that evening.

Bishop Youssef of the Coptic Orthodox Diocese of the Southern United States issued a press release saying the church would be fasting and praying "not for the martyrs" but for the healing of the Egyptian people and for Muslims and Christians to live peacefully together.

On 12 December President Sisi and Coptic Pope Tawadros led the funeral procession, after the Coptic Pope officiated over the funeral.

Egyptian journalist and talk show host, Amr Adib, interviewed survivors and interviewed the doctors who reconstructed the bomber's face from the pieces that were left at the scene. Doctors described and showed the bomber's head, in graphic detail, even lifting it and opening and closing his mouth, and showed how they had to stuff his head with cotton because it was empty. They explained to the On Ent channel TV audience what can be accomplished through DNA analysis.

Azza Radwan Sedky, an Egyptian academic who wrote Cairo Rewind about the Egyptian Revolution, wrote "An Open Letter to a Suicide Bomber" saying:

I hope you understand the consequences of your atrocious act. Your kind will never be able to command any country in the world because every country and every human being wishes you ill, hoping that the likes of you disappear from the face of the earth.

and it was published in Ahram Online on 19 December 2016.

=== International ===
- United Nations – The UN Security Council strongly condemned the terrorist attack. The Council reiterated that "any acts of terrorism are criminal and unjustifiable, regardless of their motivation, wherever, whenever and by whomsoever committed" and underscored the need to bring perpetrators, organizers, financiers and sponsors of these reprehensible acts to justice.
- Human Rights Watch and Amnesty International made statements which were rebuked by the Egyptian Ministry of Foreign Affairs.

=== Countries ===
- Algeria - Abdul Aziz bin Ali Al-Sharif, official spokesman of the Algerian Foreign Ministry, has strongly condemned the terrorist explosion.
- Bangladesh – Foreign Minister Abul Hassan Mahmud Ali wrote to his counterpart Sameh Shoukry and expressed his "profound shock and deep sorrow" on behalf of Bangladesh, the foreign ministry said. "We strongly condemn such heinous and mindless acts of violence and pray for the salvation of the departed souls", Mahmood Ali wrote in a statement.
- Jordan - Jordanian Minister of State for Media Affairs Mohammad Al Momany said that Jordan condemned the terrorist attack and support Egyptian effort in fighting terrorism.
- Gaza Strip – Hamas released a statement condemning the bombing saying, "The purpose of crimes like these, which harm innocents, is to wreak havoc and cause an exchange of accusations between parties who live in the area in a way that only helps enemies of Arab and Islamic nation".
- Israel – "Israel condemns the reprehensible terrorist attack at the Coptic cathedral in Cairo", a statement from Prime Minister Benjamin Netanyahu's office said. "Israel shares in the grief of the families of the victims and of the Egyptian people. We must unite forces and fight terrorism together."
- Malaysia - "The Government of Malaysia expresses its deepest condolences to the Government and people of the Arab Republic of Egypt and to the families and victims affected by the attack," said the Malaysian Foreign Ministry in a statement.
- Malta - On X (then known as Twitter), foreign affairs minister, George William Vella wrote "Condemn without reservations the heineous attack on the Coptic church in Cairo. Full support to the Egyptian authorities."
- Poland – In a letter to Egypt's President Abdel Fattah al-Sisi, Andrzej Duda wrote: "Please accept my expressions of the deepest sorrow and sympathy, on behalf of myself and the Polish nation."
- Philippines - Philippine Department of Foreign Affairs said in a statement that it "condemns in the strongest terms" the terrorist attacks, emphasizing that "such heinous acts of violence in a place of worship have no place in society." "We continue to stand with Egypt and the international community against terrorism in all its forms," it also added.
- Russia – Russian President Vladimir Putin denounced the "brutal attack" and expressed his "shock and grief" in his statement, particularly because of the high number of women and children who were among the victims.
- Saudi Arabia - "Such cowardly act is deplorable by Islam and all religions, as it contravenes the human values and principles and international conventions," an official source at the Ministry of Foreign Affairs said while offering condolences to the families of the victims, as well as to the Egyptian government and people, the Saudi Press Agency reported.
- Spain – Prime Minister Mariano Rajoy condemned the attack on his Twitter account.
- Turkey – "We convey our condolences to the bereaved families of those who lost their lives in this heinous attack and wish a speedy recovery to the wounded", according to a statement released by the foreign ministry.
- United States – "We strongly condemn this hateful act of violence, which targeted Egypt's Christian community. We stand with Egypt in opposing all acts of terrorism as we support a stable, secure, prosperous future for all Egyptians", the US Embassy in Cairo said in a press statement.
- Vatican City - Pope Francis expresses condolences to Pope Tawadros II of Alexandria following Botroseya Church bombing, and he said "I would like to express a special closeness to my dear brother Pope Tawadros II and to his community, and I am praying for the dead and the wounded".

== See also ==
- 2011 Alexandria bombing
- Persecution of Copts
- Qatar and state-sponsored terrorism
- 2017 Palm Sunday church bombings
- 2025 Mar Elias Church suicide bombing
