= 2011 Imbaba church attacks =

Series of attacks in Giza, Egypt on 7 May 2011

- Location: 30.07615°N 31.208882°E; Imbaba, Giza, Egypt
- Date: 7 May 2011; 16:00 local time (UTC+2)
- Target: Coptic Christians
- Attack type: Shooting and arson
- Deaths: 15
- Injuries: 232
- Perpetrator: Salafi Muslims

The 2011 Imbaba church attacks were a series of attacks that took place in Egypt on 7 May 2011 against Coptic Christian churches in the poor working-class neighborhood of Imbaba in Giza, near Cairo. The attacks were blamed on Salafi Muslims, and the attacks began when the Muslims attacked the Coptic Orthodox church of Saint Mina, where they alleged a Christian woman was being held against her will because she wanted to convert to Islam. The attacks resulted in the burning of 3 Coptic Orthodox churches, and the destruction of many Christian-owned houses and businesses. In addition, 15 people were killed in the attacks, and about 232 injured. Among those killed were four Christians and six Muslims, while two other bodies were still unidentified. Imbaba has been known to be a stronghold of Muslim fundamentalists since the 1970s, but also comprises a significant number of Coptic Christians.

== Events ==
The attack began when a mob estimated at 500 "hard-line" Salafi Muslims attacked the Coptic Orthodox church of Saint Mina in Imababa, claiming that a Christian convert to Islam was held hostage there. Christians denied that anybody was being held hostage, and police search of the church did not reveal anything. Yet, Muslims insisted on attacking the church. When the Christians protected their church and refused that the Muslims raid it, the Muslims opened gunfire at them, and threw firebombs and molotov cocktails. There were no guns with the Christians, and no gunshots were shot from within the church. During the attacks, the two sides also exchanged the throwing of stones. Apartments and shops belonging to the Christians were also torched and destroyed.

After torching the Coptic Orthodox church of Saint Mina, Salafis went ahead and burned another church, the Coptic Orthodox church of the Virgin Mary, also in Imbaba.

Military soldiers later arrived to repel the Muslim protesters. Copts also scuffled with the soldiers, blaming them for not doing enough to protect them. Nearby, firefighters also fought to control a blaze started at the Coptic Orthodox church of the Virgin Mary.

The Copts then took to the streets to protest the attacks, chanting "Oh God! Oh Jesus!", and "We sacrifice our souls and blood for the Holy Cross". They also clashed with army soldiers, blaming them for not doing enough to protect the Christians and their churches. On the other hand, Salafi Muslims demonstrated shouting "We sacrifice our souls and blood for Islam" While other Muslims, especially residents of the area shouted "Muslims and Christians are one hand", with both Muslim and Christian residents of Imbaba attempting to protect the churches and stop the fires and violence. Many blamed the police and army forces for remaining as bystanders without intervening while the two groups were clashing together. In addition, many injured victims could not be transported to hospitals because the ambulance cars were prevented from entering the area of clashes.

== Background ==
The year 2011 was marked by an increased violence against Egypt's Coptic Christian minority by Muslim radicals. The year began with the bombing of a Coptic church in Alexandria, which left 23 dead. Claims that Coptic Christian women who had converted to Islam have been kidnapped by Coptic authorities and held in churches or monasteries has exacerbated the tension. Such claims were adopted by an al-Qaeda-linked group in Iraq responsible for the 2010 Baghdad church attack on 31 October 2010. The group, the Islamic State of Iraq, vowed further attacks against Christians until two Coptic women, who they allege converted to Islam and were being held against their will, were freed. On 29 April, some 2,000 Muslims protested outside the Coptic Church's headquarters in Cairo, demanding the release of the two alleged imprisoned converts.

None of these claims was founded. In fact, the Imbaba church attacks took place on the same day a video was broadcast featuring Kamilia Shehata, one of these two Christian woman whom the Muslims claimed had converted to Islam and was being held hostage by the Coptic Church. In that video, Kamilia Shehata affirmed that she was Christian and had never converted to Islam. She also mentioned that everything the Salafis said about her were "lies" and "completely wrong facts". Kamilia Shehata had been a major focus of Salafi activism since 2010. They had organized several marches in Alexandria calling for her release and attacking Pope Shenouda III. They also threatened to attack churches in order to free her. On 29 April 2011, about 2,000 Salafi Muslims protested outside the headquarters of the Coptic Orthodox Church in Saint Mark's Coptic Orthodox Cathedral to demand the release of Kamilia Shehata. These claims of the Coptic Church holding Kamilia Shehata hostage were picked up by Al Qaida linked Islamic State of Iraq to justify their 2010 Baghdad church attack, which resulted in the massacre of 58 Christians in Iraq. The group also vowed more attacks until Kamilia was released. Two months later, on New Year's Eve 2011, a suicide bomber killed 23 Coptic Christians in the 2011 Alexandria bombing.

== Responsibility ==
According to the investigatory commission charged with investigating the events that took place in Imbaba, the attacks were initiated by Salafi Muslims with collaboration from some Muslim thugs who live in the neighborhood. According to the commission, the aggressors organized themselves into two groups; the first firing gunshots to prevent the Christians from protecting the church, while the second group broke into the church and completely torched it. Egypt's human rights council also blamed the Salafi Muslims for the attack. The human rights council also blamed the Salafis for "the intensification of extremist religious interpretations that propose rearranging Egyptian society to exclude Christians."

== Reaction ==
The Christian Copts who were injured in the attacks strongly criticized the Muslim Salafis and accused them of instigating and staging the attacks. One particular prominent Salafi figure, Mohamed Hassan, took much of the blame. The Christian victims also expressed their concerns about being the targets of systematic attacks, and about the hesitancy of the police and the military to protect them.

Immediately following the attacks, a few Copts demonstrated in front of the American Embassy in Cairo, calling for international protection of Egypt's Christian community, and criticizing the Egyptian government for not doing enough to protect them.

On the day following the attack, thousands of Christians protested in Tahrir Square and in front of Maspiro television building against the government's leniency towards the aggressors and to call for immediate investigation into the clashes and the torching of churches. The Christian protesters were met with stones and bricks thrown from rooftops, and various clashes erupted between Christians and Muslims, which resulted in the injury of 42 people. Christians also demonstrated in Alexandria to denounce the attack on their churches in Imbaba.

== Consequences ==
The attacks had profound impact on the relationship between Muslims and Christians in Egypt. For the first time, Coptic Christians decided to form self-defense militias to protect Christian churches, homes and businesses. Essam Sharaf, the Egyptian prime minister, promised to implement within 30 days a new legislation that lifted the restrictions facing the construction of new Christian churches in Egypt, and standardized the requirements needed for building houses of worship belonging to all faiths. The Egyptian government also passed a new law criminalizing discrimination based on religion, and another banning demonstrations and gatherings outside places of worship.

Following the attacks, the Egyptian army declared it had arrested 190 people in connection with the clashes.

== See also ==
- Persecution of Copts
- Christianity in Egypt
- 2011 Alexandria bombing
- 2010 Baghdad church attack
- Nag Hammadi massacre
- Maspero demonstrations
- 2015 kidnapping and beheading of Copts in Libya - video claims that Copts kidnap Muslim women.
