= Kosheh massacres =

2000 massacre of Coptic Christians in Egypt

Kosheh massacre
- Kosheh massacres (Egypt)
- Location: 26°14′03″N 32°05′07″E; Kosheh, Egypt
- Date: 31 December 1999 – 2 January 2000 (riots); 2 January 2000 (massacre)
- Target: Coptic Christians
- Attack type: Massacre
- Deaths: 21
- Injuries: 40

Twenty-one Coptic Christians were the victims of a massacre in Kosheh, Upper Egypt, located 450 kilometres south of Cairo, on Sunday, 2 January 2000. The Coptic Christians killed in this incident were considered martyrs of the Coptic Orthodox Church by Pope Shenouda III.

A book entitled Massacre at the Millennium was published in 2001 by Freedom House documenting the events.

== About Kosheh ==
Kosheh is located on the eastern bank of the Nile in Sohag Governorate, a few miles east of Balyana. The population of Kosheh is about 35,000, with 70% being Christian Copts. Kosheh is the trading center for a number of villages in the area. There is little farmland in Kosheh; it serves rather as the shopping nexus for the rural areas around it. Most of the shopkeepers are Copts, while most of the farmers in the surrounding villages are Muslims.

== First Kosheh Massacre ==
Tensions between Christians and Muslims had started a few years earlier, in August 1998, in what is known as the First Kosheh Massacre. In this incident, two Copts were murdered by Muslims. The Muslims in turn were allegedly seeking revenge for the "poisoning" of a brother. In response, the Egyptian police rounded up about 1,200 Christians for investigation into the murder. When Metropolitan Wissa of El Balyana (Abydos), whose diocese includes el-Kosheh, criticised the arrests, he was himself arrested with two of his priests, and was charged with inciting strife and damaging national unity between Christians and Muslims.

In October 1998, an article by Christina Lamb in London's Daily Telegraph reported that some of the arrested Copts had undergone mock crucifixions and that Metropolitan Wissa faced possible execution. The Egyptian government was outraged at the negative publicity, and arrested the head of the Egyptian Organization for Human Rights (EOHR), whom it accused of having given the story to the Daily Telegraph. The head of the EOHR and Metropolitan Wissa were eventually released. Although the government promised to punish any police officers who had acted improperly, some of the police officers involved in the human rights violations against the Copts in el-Kosheh were in fact promoted. Thus, the First Kosheh Massacre turned into an international incident. As a result, Coptic groups in the West began to push for the US Congress to include Egypt among nations that discriminate against Christians.

== Second Kosheh Massacre ==
The Second Kosheh Massacre took place about one year later, on Friday, 31 December 1999. The incidence stemmed from a quarrel between a Christian merchant and a Muslim customer. The misunderstanding strained Muslim-Christian relations in the community. Relatives of the Muslim customer targeted Christian-owned shops and homes, which were looted, destroyed, and burned. Initially, the police was able to contain the situation. However, two days later on Sunday 2 January 2000, riots spread violence into neighbouring villages and lead to the murders of 20 Christians. One Muslim was also accidentally shot dead by a fellow Muslim. More than 40 people were injured in the two-day incident. 260 shops, houses and kiosks were also deliberately burnt or damaged. Most of the killings took place in the outskirts of Kosheh, especially in the agriculture fields. This event was one of Egypt's bloodiest massacres.

The local authorities during the incident did little to control the situation. There were some cases where these officers participated in the killings. Following the massacre, the entire Coptic community felt that these events epitomised the criminal negligence of the Egyptian administration, represented in its police force, when it comes to protecting Coptic lives and property. Since local police units are often drawn from the local community, local feuds including Muslim resentment of Christian families can very well influence police behaviour.

On 1 December 2000, a criminal court in Sohag Governorate released without bail all 89 defendants charged in the New Year's massacre in Kosheh. It was unprecedented in Egypt that several dozen murder suspects would be released without bail a month before their verdict was determined. All suspects that were initially arrested in connection to this massacre were eventually acquitted had their charges dropped. The only person convicted in the massacre was a Muslim charged with accidental killing of another Muslim, and sentenced to 13 years in prison. No one was ever convicted for the murder of the 21 Christian victims. This led to outrage in the Coptic community who felt that these suspects should be in custody. The Pope of Alexandria Shenouda III rejected the verdict openly, and told reporters "We want to challenge this ruling. We don't accept it." Metropolitan Wissa of el-Balyana (Abydos), whose diocese includes Kosheh, called the ruling "A shame that defames the reputation of Egypt and an invitation for more violence". Egypt's Prosecutor General Maher Abdel-Wahid appealed the acquittal verdict of the defendants, stating that "there is no doubt that 21 people were killed, and the killers must be brought to justice," "We never imagined that they would release the killers, but this is Egypt", a Copt from Kosheh admitted by telephone.

Six days following the acquittal of the defendants, the homes of four Christian families in Kosheh were set to fire and completely destroyed. One of the homeowners who reported the arson to the Egyptian police was tortured and forced to sign a statement prepared by a public prosecutor charging him with perpetrating the whole incident. He was subsequently forced to post bail for his own release.

== See also ==
- Persecution of Copts
- List of massacres in Egypt
