= 2011 Alexandria bombing =

Attack on Coptic Christians in Egypt

- Part of the persecution of Copts
- Location: 31°15′47″N 29°59′31″E; Alexandria, Egypt
- Date: 1 January 2011; 00:20 (UTC+02:00)
- Target: Coptic Christians
- Attack type: Suicide bombing
- Deaths: 23
- Injuries: 97
- Motive: Anti-Christian Sentiment and Islamic Extremism

Twenty-three people were killed and another ninety-seven were injured in a bombing attack targeting Coptic Christians in Alexandria, Egypt, on New Year's Day, 1 January 2011. The attack occurred as the Christian worshipers were leaving a church. The attack was the deadliest act of violence against Egypt's Coptic Christians in a decade, since the Kosheh massacre in 2000 left 20 Copts dead. The target of the bombing was the Saints Church, a Coptic church located across the street from the Masjid Sharq El-Madina mosque.

== Background ==
Copts in Egypt complain of increasing persecution, from attacks by Muslim extremists and what they see as official discrimination by the state. Copts celebrate Christmas on 7 January. This was the second consecutive Christmas with violence. On Christmas Eve in 2010, a Muslim gunman fired on worshipers leaving a church in Upper Egypt, killing 7 people.

In the months before the incident, the religious ambiance in Egypt had been clouded by anti-Church sentiment, in particular regarding the public allegation made by Mohammad Salim Al-Awa that the Coptic Orthodox Church was storing weapons in churches and monasteries.

In November, a group calling itself Al-Qaeda in Iraq announced that all Christians in the Middle East would be "legitimate targets." The Alexandria bombing occurred almost two months to the day after the attack on Our Lady of Salvation church in central Baghdad in what militants called a response to the mistreatment of Muslim converts by Egyptian Copts. Al-Qaeda's Iraqi affiliate claimed responsibility for that attack and made new threats against Christians. The group threatened to attack Egyptian Copts if their church did not free two Christians, it said had been "imprisoned in their monasteries" for having converted to Islam. The two women were Camilia Chehata and Wafa Constantine, the wives of Coptic priests whose claimed conversion caused a stir in Egypt.

Two weeks before the bombing an Islamist website called for attacks on a list of Egypt's churches, and included the church that was hit.

== Bombing ==
An explosive device detonated in front of the Coptic Orthodox church of Saint Mark and Pope Peter in the Sidi Bishr neighbourhood in Alexandria. Initial reports stated that it was a car explosion, however an Interior Ministry statement later declared that it was a suicide attack, through the Egyptian official news agency.

At the time of the blast, several thousand Coptic Christians were attending midnight prayer service at the church at the occasion of the new year. The explosion resulted in scattered body parts, destroyed cars and smashed windows. 21 Coptic Christians were killed and about 97 people – most of them Christians – were injured. The remains were covered with newspapers until they were brought inside the church. Two more Copts died in the hospital over the few days following the attack, raising the total number to 23, all of whom were Coptic Christians. According to one eyewitness report, the first victim was a Muslim salesperson who sold Quran books across the street from the Saints Church.

Forensic testing confirmed that the explosive device used was homemade and contained nails and ball-bearings. The Interior Ministry stated that the bomb was filled with small pieces of metal to serve as shrapnel, and that a foreign-backed suicide bomber may have been responsible.

== Responsibility ==
Egypt's former Interior Minister Habib Ibrahim el-Adly said on 23 January that evidence proved that the Salafi jihadist group Army of Islam planned and executed the attack. The group, based in Gaza, quickly denied the charge, while also reportedly expressing support for the bombing. Hamas, the governing authority of Gaza, condemned the attack, while expressing concern with the accusations against the Army of Islam and calling on Egypt to share its information regarding their involvement.

Following el-Adly's dismissal from the Interior Ministry on 31 January, Attorney General Abdel Meguid Mahmoud opened a probe into his alleged involvement in the bombing. Coptic lawyer Ramzi Mamdouh, who originally presented the proclamation against el-Adly to the Prosecutor's Office, alleged that the attack had been orchestrated by the Interior Ministry's security apparatus with the intent to blame it on Islamists, escalate the government crackdown on them, and increase Western support for the government.

By July 2011, nobody had yet been brought to trial, and the Coptic Church threatened to sue the Interior Ministry.

== Reactions ==
=== Coptic community in Egypt ===
Copts were deeply aggrieved by this attack, many believing that the Egyptian state security's failure to deal firmly with past attacks on Christians in Egypt contributed to this attack, while others went as far as to directly blame the State Security for the bombings. One member of the Coptic community declared, "The government is the reason this happened. They are the terrorists who attack us every day."

Following the bombing, several thousand Copts took to the streets in protest. Furious Christians clashed with Egyptian police and Egyptian security forces. Christians and Muslims pelted each other with rocks, and cars were torched. After these overnight protests, more than 100 Christians protested the following morning near the church that was attacked, chanting "We sacrifice our souls and blood for the Holy Cross" and "O Mubarak, the heart of the Copts is on fire". The Egyptian police reacted by firing rubber bullets and tear gas at the Christians.

In Cairo, about 4,000 Christians and Muslims demonstrated against terrorism in the predominantly Christian neighborhood of Shubra. The demonstration lasted for six hours and was joined by both government and opposition members of the Egyptian parliament and a number of political figures, including a former minister and Tomorrow Party founder Ayman Nour. In the same neighborhood of Shubra, thousands of Coptic Christians clashed with riot police for three consecutive days, resulting in injuries to both Coptic civilians and riot police soldiers.

Thousands of Copts demonstrated at the Monastery of Saint Simon the Tanner in Cairo. The demonstrators called for the resignation of the Egyptian government. They chanted, "With our souls and blood we redeem our Cross". They then clashed with the Egyptian security forces, resulting in injuries to 12 of the Coptic demonstrators.

In addition, thousands of Coptic Christians demonstrated outside the Egyptian ministry of foreign affairs and the state television buildings for two consecutive days.

Pope Shenouda III strongly condemned the "criminal assault", blaming it on "forces that wish no good for Egypt". The Pope also called upon the government to "speedily arrest and prosecute the perpetrator of this criminal act." His personal secretary said the incident had "severely grieved us, because it is very alien to the love and harmony in which the nation lives".

The top cleric in Alexandria, the Patriarchal Vicar Hegumen Ruweis Marcos, said that the Egyptian government and security forces wanted to blame the bombing on a suicide bomber instead of a car bomb in order to write off the crime as something carried out by a lone attacker. He also denounced the lack of protection in front of the church, stating he was surprised to find only three soldiers and one officer guarding the church at such a sensitive time in spite of the recent numerous threats against Copts.

The Synod of priests in Alexandria unanimously criticized the lax attitude of the Egyptian authorities towards the public expression of hatred against Coptic Christians. In a statement issued by the Synod, the priests said that the attack on the church was "the result of anti-Christian mobilization and the lies recently propagated against the Coptic Orthodox Church."

On the Sunday following the bombings, Coptic parishioners at the bombed church of Saint Mark and Pope Peter expressed anger, and protested discrimination that Christians in Egypt are facing. One of the parishioners declared "in this country, we cannot even pray in churches." Another blamed the anti-Coptic sentiments spread by the Islamic mosques. The priest of the church blamed "Islamic fanaticism" and "Islamic extremism". He called upon the Egyptian government to ensure the rights of the Christians in "life, prayer and work".

Officials of the Coptic Orthodox Church announced that prayers for Eastern Christmas would still be held, but that celebrations would be canceled.

=== Coptic community in the diaspora ===
Memorial services were held in Coptic churches across Europe in memory of the victims of the bombing.

The Coptic Orthodox Church in Britain issued an official statement condemning the massacre, and expressing concern that incidents of violence and terror against Christians in Egypt were increasingly spiraling out of control. The statement also criticized the fact that crimes against the Copts in Egypt were going unchecked and unresolved, and their perpetrators were not brought to justice.

In Montreal, Quebec, Canada, all five Coptic churches in the city decided to proceed under tightened security with the Eastern Christmas Eve mass on the eve of Eastern Christmas but decided not to hold any celebrations. The celebrations were canceled in honor of the victims of the Alexandria massacre, and money that was to be spent on the celebrations was sent to the families of the victims in Alexandria. About 4,000 Coptics and some Muslim supporters marched on 19 January in central Sydney, calling on Prime Minister Julia Gillard and Foreign Minister Kevin Rudd to address the issue of persecution of Copts in Egypt.

=== Domestic ===
The Egyptian government issued a statement immediately following the bombing blaming "foreign elements" for the planning and execution of the bombing.

President Hosni Mubarak promised in a televised address that terrorists would not destabilize Egypt or divide Christians and Muslims. He said the attack "carries evidence of the involvement of foreign fingers" and vowed to pursue the perpetrators. Many doubt that the perpetrators will be pursued, citing the Mubarak regime's preference for handling violence against the country's Christian minority through a reconciliation process between the perpetrators and the victims, rather than prosecution of the perpetrators.

The governor of Alexandria, Adel Labib, accused Al-Qaeda of planning the bombing, without giving any further details.

Many Egyptians expressed their disappointment regarding the government's claims that Al-Qaeda and foreign elements were behind the massacre, seeing those claims as a way for the government to evade the issue of growing sectarian divisions in the country.

In a message to Pope Shenouda III, Patriarch Theodore II of the Greek Orthodox Church of Alexandria strongly condemned the "brutal criminal attack" against a church "where prayers were being recited for the peace of Egypt, for the peace of those in power, and for the peace of the world." Patriarch Theodore II also described the victims as "Martyrs of the Church".

Refaa al-Tahtawi, spokesman for Al-Azhar, Sunni Islam's main institution based in Cairo, appeared on television to denounce the attack, which he said targeted "Egyptian national unity". He also appealed to Christians and Muslims for calm.

The attack was also condemned by the Muslim Brotherhood, who also called upon Muslims to protect Christian churches. On the eve of the Coptic Christmas on 6 January 2011, Egyptian Muslims showed up at churches during mass service offering to serve as a "human shield" against any possible further attacks.

Both government and independent newspapers warned that civil war could break out in Egypt unless Muslims and Christians close ranks. Newspapers also urged the Egyptian government to focus on the situation of the Copts, who often complain of discrimination.

In an interview that aired on Al-Fareen TV (Egypt) on 3 January 2011 (as translated by MEMRI), Former Egyptian Deputy Minister Abdallah Al-Ash'al stated that:

Today, many young people in Egypt are unhappy. They flee the country and prefer to die on the shores of the Mediterranean, because they have no job opportunities here...The Mossad has exploited this. The people who carried out this attack are Egyptians, but the Mossad exploited them...Are these nothing but theories? No. When Israeli military intelligence chief Amos Yadlin submitted a report about the past four and a half years, he stated clearly that Israel was exploiting the peace treaty in order to infiltrate Egypt.

=== International community ===
- In the days following the attack, Pope Shenouda III met with the ambassadors of the US, the UK and Bosnia and Herzegovina, who expressed the condolences of their respective countries to the Pope and to the Coptic Church.
- Vatican City: Pope Benedict XVI of the Roman Catholic Church denounced the attacks in his New Year address. He also appealed for religious freedom and religious tolerance in the Middle East, and urged world leaders to defend Christians against discrimination, abuse and religious intolerance which are today striking Christians in particular.
- United Kingdom: Archbishop of Canterbury Dr. Rowan Williams condemned the bombing, declaring that "The New Year's Eve attack on Christians in Alexandria is yet another dreadful reminder of the pressure Christian minorities are under in the Middle East, echoing the atrocities we have seen in recent weeks", in reference to the attack on the church of Our Lady of Salvation in Iraq, carried out by the Islamic State of Iraq.
- United States: U.S. President Barack Obama condemned the bombing, stating that: "The perpetrators of this attack were clearly targeting Christian worshipers, and have no respect for human life and dignity. They must be brought to justice for this barbaric and heinous act." Obama also offered assistance to the Egyptian government in responding to the "terrible event."
- Canada: Canadian Prime Minister Stephen Harper met with Coptic Christian leaders to condemn the Alexandria massacre and to confirm that Canada stands behind the right of the Copts to safely practice their faith. He also declared that the international community must stay vigilant against such violence against Coptic Christians. Canadian Minister of Foreign Affairs Lawrence Cannon issued a statement stating that "Canada condemns this latest vicious attack by extremists against Egypt's Coptic community," and offering his sympathy with the families and friends of the victims. The statement also called upon Egypt's President Hosni Mubarak to close ranks and confront the terrorists who were behind this deplorable attack.
- France: On the day of the bombing, French Prime Minister François Fillon, who was vacationing in the Upper Egyptian city of Aswan, visited the Coptic Orthodox cathedral in Aswan to pray for the souls of the victims, to express solidarity with the Coptic community and to express France's commitment to defending religious freedom in Egypt and the world. French President Nicolas Sarkozy denounced the "blind and cowardly crime" against Christians in Egypt and expressed his "shock and great sadness". Sarkozy also called upon Egyptian president Hosni Mubarak to "find and punish the perpetrators and sponsors of this indiscriminate and cowardly crime." In a written statement, MEP Marine Le Pen lent her support to the Coptic Christians.
- Italy: The Italian foreign ministry issued a statement "firmly condemning" the attack and confirming that Italy would "continue to make its voice heard to ensure the full protection of religious freedom in all the circumstances".
- Germany: German Chancellor Angela Merkel expressed her condolences for "this barbaric act of terror"., However, Stefan Mueller, parliamentary leader of the junior coalition party, the Christian Social Union (CSU), called on Angela Merkel to go further, by linking development aid to the treatment of Christians in relevant countries.
- European Union: The High Representative for Foreign Affairs and Security Policy of the European Union Catherine Ashton condemned "unreservedly the attack against innocent Copt worshipers", stating that "there cannot be any justification for this attack" and that "the right of Christian Copts to gather and worship freely must be protected."
- Russia: The Russian Foreign Ministry condemned the attack in the Egyptian city of Alexandria by issuing the following statement on the day of the terrorist attack: "Moscow strongly condemns this criminal attack of extremists. Such bloody acts, resulting in the death and suffering of innocent people and provoking interconfessional strife are unjustifiable" On the same day, Russian President Dmitry Medvedev sent his condolences to Egyptian President Hosni Mubarak saying: "It was with a deep sorrow that I learned about the criminal blast near the Christian church in the city of Alexandria on the night of 1 January 2011. Please convey my sincere condolences to the relatives of the victims and my wishes for a fastest recovery to the injured. Strongly condemning the bloody attack of extremists, I wish to assure you that Russia was and will be on the side of Egypt and its people in the uncompromising fight that ensues against the violent challenges of terrorism."
- Lebanon: In Lebanon, Amine Gemayel former President of Lebanon and leader of the Kataeb Party called the crime a "massacre" and a "genocide", stating that: "massacres are taking place for no reason and without any justification against Christians. It is only because they are Christians. What is happening to Christians is a genocide." Walid Jumblatt, leader of the Progressive Socialist Party, condemned the attack, calling on Egypt to boost the political participation of Christians in state institutions in a bid to counter attempts to spark strife and tamper with civil peace. A spokesman of the Movement of the Future condemned the massacre as a delegation from the movement visited the Coptic church in Beirut to offer their condolences to members of the Coptic community. Maronite Archbishop of Byblos, Bchara al-Raii, condemned the massacre, and called for a Muslim summit to condemn attacks carried out by radical movements against Christians under the guise of Islam. He also urged the Egyptian government to protect Christians and ensure equal treatment for them. Separate condemnations came from the Sunni Mufti of the Republic Mohammad Qabbani and Deputy Head of the Shiite Supreme Council Abdul Amir Qabalan.
- Israel: In Israel, Prime Minister Benjamin Netanyahu expressed his "great shock" and reaffirmed his conviction of "the need for a common front by all countries that believe in freedom in the face of terrorism."
- Syria: In Syria, an official source spoke against "such terrorist crimes" and expressed "condolences to Egypt and the families of the innocent victims". Condemnation came as well from the Eastern Orthodox Patriarch of Antioch and the Orient Ignatius IV Hazim.
- Palestine: PLO chairman Mahmoud Abbas condemned the attacks calling them a "work of the criminal and inhumane, which aims to destabilize security and stability in our sister country Egypt, and to cause tensions between Muslims and Christians". Hamas condemned the bombing in Alexandria, assigning the blame to hidden hands that do not wish well for Egypt and its Muslim and Christian people and seek to inflame sectarian strife. Hamas in its statement sent condolences to Egypt and the victims' families, and hoped that facts would be disclosed the soonest and that those responsible would be brought to justice.
- The Latin Patriarch of Jerusalem Fouad Twal called on Christians to show courage in the face of the attack, declaring that "This latest massacre must lead us to reflect on our vocation as Christians in this region, which cannot be allowed to turn its back on the Cross."
- The attacks were also condemned by the UK, Iraq, Jordan, Bahrain, Poland, Kuwait, the GCC, Saudi Arabia, Qatar, and Iran.

== Funeral ==
The funeral of the victims was held in the Monastery of Saint Mina, about 30 km west of Alexandria. Between 5,000 and 10,000 people attended the funeral, all of whom adamantly rejected the condolences of president Hosni Mubarak, shouting "No! No! No!" as bishop Youanis attempted to thank Mubarak for his condolences and his statement regarding the bombing.

In addition to Bishop Youanis, Pope Shenouda III delegated Metropolitan Bakhomios to preside over the funeral of those killed in Alexandria.

== Further threats ==
In Europe, Coptic churches have been threatened with further attacks. Coptic bishops and priests in France and Germany filed complaints and called for governmental protection. In the UK, officials reported that threats were outlined against two Coptic churches in the country.

In Canada, Coptic churches were on high alert following threats by Al-Qaeda against Copts in Canada. All five Coptic churches in Montreal decided to proceed under tightened security with the Eastern Christmas Eve mass on the eve of Eastern Christmas. Following Coptic Christmas, Canadian prime minister Stephen Harper met with Coptic Christian leaders to condemn the Alexandria massacre and to confirm that Canada stands behind the right of the Copts to safely practice their faith. He also declared that the international community must stay vigilant against such violence against Coptic Christians.

The bombing also raised fears that jihadists would increase violence against Christians worldwide. Radical Islamic hostility to the Copts has been an ongoing problem. A "death list" of the names and personal information of more than a hundred Copts, many of whom live in Egypt, Europe and North America, was published in 2010 on an Al-Qaeda-affiliated website. The website called for the murder of all those whose names appear on the list, accusing them of defaming Islam and converting Muslims to Christianity.

== See also ==
- Persecution of Copts
- Nag Hammadi massacre
- Kosheh massacres
- 2011 Imbaba Church Attacks
- 2016 Cairo Cathedral bombing
- Christianity in Egypt
