= Persecution of Copts =

The persecution of Copts and broader patterns of discrimination against Christians in Egypt are reflected in a range of documented incidents throughout the country's history, including cases of forced conversion, as well as other forms of systemic marginalization. These experiences align with broader challenges facing Christian communities across the Middle East.

Copts, who constitute the Christian population of Egypt and primarily belong to the Oriental Orthodox tradition (specifically the Coptic Orthodox church), make up an estimated 10% of Egypt's total population. They represent the largest religious minority in the country.

Throughout modern Egyptian history, Copts have reported instances of discrimination, sectarian violence, and social marginalization. Human Rights Watch has documented increasing religious intolerance and attacks against Christian communities in recent decades, and has criticized the Egyptian government for its repeatedly to adequately investigate or prosecute such incidents. In some cases, commentators and religious leaders have argued that incidents targeting Christians may be influenced by political or socio-economic tensions rather than religious motives alone.

Human rights organizations and community advocacy groups have also raised ongoing concerns regarding the abduction and forced disappearance of Christian women and girls. These incidents are frequently cited in the context of broader patterns of sectarian discrimination.

Recent reports indicate some improvement in the situation of Christians in Egypt, particularly in the area of church construction. Christians have gained greater freedom to build and renovate churches in several regions, marking a shift from earlier restrictive policies. This follows the 2016 Church Construction Law, which, despite early criticism, has resulted in the legalization of thousands of churches. Increased cooperation from government authorities has been reported, and in some areas, communities have built new places of worship without obstruction. Observers view these developments as signs of reduced overt persecution, though social discrimination and bureaucratic obstacles remain.

Following the 2011 revolution and during the rule of the Muslim Brotherhood in 2013, the Christian nonprofit organization Open Doors ranked Egypt 25th out of 50 countries on its World Watch List of nations where Christians face the highest levels of persecution. By 2025, Egypt had dropped to 40th place out of 50, indicating a measurable decline in reported persecution. Although challenges remain, Egypt ranked among the least dangerous countries in the region for Christians, behind Jordan, Turkey, and Qatar.

== History ==
=== Roman Egypt ===
According to tradition, St. Mark the Evangelist founded the See of Alexandria and became its first Patriarch. By the late first century, Christian writings had appeared in Oxyrhynchus, suggesting that Christianity had spread beyond Alexandria in its early stages. During the mid-third century, Christians in Egypt faced systematic persecution under Roman imperial policies, beginning with the Edict of Decius. Under Emperor Diocletian (r. 284–305), persecution intensified, and large numbers of Egyptian Christians were executed. This period, remembered in the Coptic calendar as the "Era of the Martyrs," marked a significant point in the development of a distinct Egyptian Christian tradition.

In response to persecution, many Christians retreated to the desert, where the ascetic lifestyle gave rise to the monastic movement. Egypt became a center of early Christian monasticism, led by figures such as Anthony the Great, Pachomius, Saint Shenouda the Archimandrite, and Saint Amun. By the end of the 4th century, Christianity had become the dominant religion in Egypt.

In 451 CE, the Council of Chalcedon led to a schism within the Church of Alexandria. Supporters of the council, known as Chalcedonians or Melkites, diverged from those who rejected its Christological definition, often referred to (by their opponents) as Monophysites. The latter preferred the term Miaphysite, which they regarded as more theologically accurate. The majority of Egyptian Christians adhered to the Miaphysite doctrine, leading to conflict with the Byzantine Empire, particularly under emperors Marcian and Leo I the Thracian. Persecution continued under Cyrus of Alexandria, especially during the period of Monothelitism, until the Muslim conquest of Egypt.

=== Under Muslim rule ===
==== Middle Ages ====
The Muslim conquest of Egypt occurred between 639 and 641 CE, during the reign of Emperor Heraclius, at a time when the Byzantine authorities continued to suppress non-Chalcedonian Christians. Under Muslim rule, Christians were classified as dhimmi, a protected class under Islamic law. This status allowed them to practice their religion publicly and exempted them from military service in exchange for paying the jizya tax. (Note: See:)

While initial policies granted religious freedom, over time discriminatory practices increased. Historical accounts suggest that pressure to convert, including social and economic incentives, contributed to a gradual Islamization of the population.

Some accounts from the early Islamic period illustrate the imbalance in power between Muslim rulers and Christian subjects. A notable example attributed to Amr ibn al-As describes the limited ability of Copts to invoke treaties and their subjection to arbitrary authority.

Under the Fatimid Caliphate, especially during the reign of Al-Hakim bi-Amr Allah, policies toward non-Muslims fluctuated sharply. Al-Hakim issued a series of decrees prohibiting Christian festivals, restricting religious symbols, and imposing dress codes to distinguish Jews and Christians. In 1009, he ordered the destruction of the Church of the Holy Sepulchre in Jerusalem, an act that had significant repercussions for interreligious relations. Emile Maher Ishaq, a noted Coptologist, writes in the Coptic Encyclopedia that Al-Hakim bi-Amr Allah issued strict orders completely prohibiting the use of Coptic anywhere, whether in schools, public streets, and even homes. Those who did not comply were liable to have their tongues cut off. Oral traditions of the Coptic Church tell of removed tongues left on the street or in a public square to intimidate and warn against speaking Coptic.

Although Coptic Christianity remained widespread in Egypt for several centuries, it began to lose its majority status after the 14th century. Under Saladin, discriminatory laws were reinstated, and by the Mamluk period, the legal enforcement of non-Muslim identification through clothing had become standard.

Widespread violence against Christians occurred in the 14th century. Riots in 1321, described by historian Donald P. Little as coordinated attacks, destroyed numerous churches and monasteries across Egypt. In 1354, mobs reportedly targeted Christians and Jews, coercing them to convert to Islam or face death. Accounts from contemporary chroniclers like Al-Maqrizi suggest this period marked a sharp decline in the Christian population. Some sources estimate that as many as 300,000 Christians may have been killed during the Mamluk era.

In certain cases, individuals who had converted to Islam but later sought to return to Christianity faced execution, highlighting the risks associated with apostasy.

In 1389, a great procession of Copts who had accepted Muhammad under fear of death, marched through Cairo. Repenting of their apostasy, they now wished to atone for it by the inevitable consequence of returning to Christianity. So as they marched, they announced that they believed in Christ and renounced Muhammad. They were seized and all the men were beheaded one after another in an open square before the women. But this did not terrify the women; so they, too, were all martyred.

Anti-Christian violence was further exacerbated by resentment toward the administrative prominence of Copts in the state bureaucracy.

==== Ottoman Egypt ====
Edward William Lane, an Arabist who traveled around Egypt in the 1820s disguised as a Muslim, was one of the first modern Europeans to witness the execution of an apostate—in this case, a female convert to Christianity who was exposed by her Coptic cross tattoo. Lane recounts:

Apostasy from the faith of Islam is considered a most heinous sin, and must be punished with death, unless the apostate will recant on being thrice warned. I once saw a woman paraded through the streets of Cairo, and afterwards taken down to the Nile to be drowned, for having apostatized from the faith of Muhammad, and having married a Christian. Unfortunately, she tattooed a blue cross on her arm, which led to her detection by one of her former friends in a bath. She was mounted upon a high-saddled ass, such as ladies in Egypt usually ride, and very respectably dressed, attended by soldiers, and surrounded by a rabble, who, instead of commiserating, uttered loud imprecations against her. The Kadee [or qadi, a Muslim judge] who passed sentence upon her, exhorted her, in vain, to return to her former faith. She was taken in a boat into the midst of the river, stripped nearly naked, strangled and then thrown into the stream.

Legal restrictions on church construction were codified in the Hamayouni Decree of 1856, which required imperial approval for new churches and renovations. These limitations persisted under the Ten Conditions of Al-Ezabi until their revocation in 1999. However, they were partially reinstated by Decree 291 in 2005.

The Ottoman administration imposed heavy taxation on the Copts and, at times, subjected them to arbitrary violence, including extrajudicial killings. Ottoman soldiers would inflict punishments on Copts more violent than what was due by law. There is a record of Ottoman janissaries enacting the death penalty on two Copts for slandering a qadi judge, when the qadi himself decreed a lighter sentence. Acts of violence like this one would be used to scare other Copts into conversion. Febe Armanios references a record from a Muslim source regarding the execution of a Christian in Mamluk Egypt:

There was a Christian person who was called ‘Abd al-Salib. He was from the area of Dalja in the southern regions. It was said about him that he insulted the Prophet, peace be upon him, with vulgar words... When they brought the Christian before the sultan and he confessed to what he said against the Prophet, peace be upon him, they offered him conversion to Islam, but he refused... He pledged not to change his religion, so the judges condemned him to death. Representatives of the ruler bore witness to this [confession]. So they mounted him on a camel while he was nailed, and they displayed him in Cairo until they brought him to al-Madrasa al-Salihiyya. They beheaded him under the windows of the school. The public then brought fire and wood and burned his body in the midst of the market [sūq]. When nighttime fell, the dogs came and ate his bones, and his matter ended.

— Ibn Iyas, Badā’i‘, 4:286.

Armanios claims that Salib's desire for martyrdom "likely echoed [Ottoman Copts'] daily frustrations of being part of a marginalized community bound by various legal and social limitations."

During this persecution, the Roman Catholic Church took the opportunity to offer the Copts socioeconomic support in exchange for conversion from Non-Chalcedonian Christianity to Catholic Chalcedonian Christianity. "The Copts, as Iris Habib al-Misri presented it, faced two challenges under Turkish rule: “the home front against the Turks and their nefarious malevolence, and the foreign front against the incursions of the Roman Church.”" These advances by the Church of Rome were seen by the Coptic faithful as a source of "friction" during an already tumultuous period. At one point, a delegation sent by Pope Youannis XI had verbally agreed to the acceptance of Chalcedon, however the agreement was never followed through with. These Roman pressures also caused Coptic notables to brush against Coptic clergy, and at one point even had the patriarch deposed and imprisoned by the Ottoman state. The increasing influence of Rome caused Coptic clergymen, such as Bishop Yousab and Pope Yoannis XVIII, to publish works against Chalcedon intend for the Coptic laity.

=== Late 19th - 20th Century ===
==== British Egypt ====
Leading up to the 20th Century, Copts held a particular role in the economic organization of Egypt, however, when the British consul arrived, they began to replace Copts in government positions with Muslims. The Coptic community had even sent representatives to London in 1908 to push for their request of equal allocation of government positions, recognition of Sunday as a holiday, and Christian religious instruction in state schools, which were by and large focused on Islamic teaching.

As English rule grew increasingly unpopular around the general Egyptian population, several Islamic parties arose, including Mustafa Kamil's Nationalist Party, referring to the previous Ottoman Islamic state as an ideal government rather than the British government. These comparisons were seen by Copts and other Christian groups as threatening, as only a decade prior, there was a violent attack against Egyptian Armenians. Kamil, however, insisted that the borderless Islamic identity would not impact the national unity of Muslims and Copts as Egyptians. This sentiment would fall through with the assassination of the Coptic Prime Minister, Boutros Ghali, by a member of the Nationalist Party in 1910: only 2 years after Kamil's own death. As tensions increased, the Copts called the First Coptic Congress of Assiut, which only served to anger Muslim Egyptians, who called their own counter-conference in response. Both congresses, however opposed, did both express a want to end British occupation, which would serve as a basis for moderates to work together against a common enemy.

Flag used in Egypt's 1919 revolution, featuring the Islamic crescent, and the Christian cross.

This mission for unity would culminate in the founding of Wafd Party, which used the slogan, "Religion belongs to God, and the fatherland belongs to all citizens." The Wafd would lead Egypt into revolution against the British, and promote Christian-Muslim unity with a flag featuring the Islamic crescent and the Christian cross.

==== Independent Egypt ====
The rise of socialism under Gamal Abdel Nasser's government, however, would lead to the rise of a new Islamic party known as the Muslim Brotherhood. The Muslim Brotherhood intended to return to the origin of Islam in Egyptian government. While Nasser, himself was friendly to Copts, especially the patriarch, Kyrillos VI, under his government, mobs mobilized by the Muslim Brotherhood would attack Copts and destroy churches, which would be difficult to repair or replace because of the Hamayouni Decree. The founder of the Brotherhood, Hassan Al-Banna, did oppose the use of violence to further the cause, however for him it was a matter of "timing" rather than principle. Due to their opposition to socialism, however, Nasser imprisoned their more prominent members. During Sadat's reign, though, members of the Muslim Brotherhood was released. To accommodate the Brotherhood, Sadat stepped away from Nasser's secularist government, and amended Egypt's constitution in April 1980, adding that "Islam is the religion of the State" and the Egypt's legislature is based on Sharia. During their time in prison, many splinter groups emerged, which would enact several violent attacks on Copts and government buildings to spread awareness to their cause, one such incident being an attack on the Technical Military College in 1974. Ahmed Gomaa says about this period that:

The situation in Egypt during the late 1970s in particular was not one in which compromises and half-solutions could be accepted. It had all the ingredients needed for a violent eruption. The pacifist approach of the Brothers was therefore sidetracked, and Qutb's militant alternative won the day.

— Ahmed Gomaa, Islam, Nationalism, and Radicalism in Egypt and the Sudan, Islamic Fundamentalism in Egypt during the 1930s and 1970s: Comparative Notes

During this time, violence from members of the Brotherhood against Copts would greatly increase.

In a series of arrests in 1981 by the standing President Anwar Sadat, Egyptian military forces surrounded the Monastery of Saint Pishoy, where the Coptic patriarch was visiting, and placed him under house arrest at the monastery.

== Contemporary ==
Observers have noted a gap between the legal rights afforded to Coptic Christians and other minorities in Egypt and the reality of their implementation. While the Egyptian parliament passed a law in 2016 aimed at simplifying the process for Christians to obtain government approval to build churches, reports indicate that security authorities have obstructed actual construction in some cases. Egypt also does not officially recognize conversions from Islam to Christianity.

Government regulations require permits for constructing or renovating churches, and these are often delayed or denied. Article 235 of Egypt's 2013 draft constitution mandates that the first post-constitution parliament pass a law regulating church construction in a manner intended to ease restrictions.

Critics have also pointed to the use of informal "reconciliation councils" to resolve disputes involving Christians and Muslims. These councils, often dominated by local authorities or community leaders, have been criticized for favoring Muslim parties and for operating outside the formal judicial system. There are also allegations of police inaction in response to crimes targeting Christians. Representation of Christians in state institutions remains limited, contributing to perceptions of political marginalization.

Egyptian officials and commentators often attribute communal violence in rural areas to tribal customs and long-standing local rivalries rather than systemic religious discrimination. (Note: See:)

Claims of discrimination have extended to the realm of sports, where Christians are reportedly underrepresented in national athletic delegations, including the national football team. In 2018, Pope Tawadros II remarked that "it is extraordinary that all of Egypt’s football teams do not have a single Copt who played football in his youth". Former national team player Ahmed Hossam, known as Mido, stated in an interview that "regrettably, there's a lot of people in Egypt who are bigoted over colour, religion and ethnicity... In the history of football in Egypt, only five Christians have played at the top level."

=== List of incidents ===
| Date | Location | Description | Casualties | Source(s) |
|---|---|---|---|---|
| 20 June 1981 | Zawya Hamra, Egypt | Clashes between members of the Muslim Brotherhood and Christians result in the deaths of many, including Hegumen Fr. Maximus Guirguis, who was beheaded for not denying his faith in Christ. | More than 81 dead, more than 112 injured | |
| 9 March 1992 | Dairut, Egypt | Badr Abdullah Massoud, a Christian farmer's son, is shot after refusing to pay an extortion demand. His body is later mutilated. | 1 dead | |
| 4 May 1992 | Dairut, Egypt | An armed assailant kills 13 Christians in separate incidents, including farmers in the fields, a doctor, and a schoolteacher. | 13 dead | |
| 12 February 1997 | Abu Qirqas, Egypt | Three masked gunmen enter a church and open fire during a youth meeting, killing eight Christians. A ninth is killed while the attackers flee. | 9 dead | |
| 13 March 1997 | Bahgoura, Egypt | Armed assailants fire indiscriminately in the village, killing 13 and injuring 15. A fleeing group also opens fire on a train, killing one additional person. | 14 dead, 15 injured | |
| January 2000 | Kosheh, Egypt | Rioting following a dispute between a Muslim customer and a Christian shopkeeper leads to the deaths of 20 Christians and one Muslim. | 21 dead | |
| February 2001 | Egypt | A church and 35 Christian homes are set on fire in February. | - | |
| April 2001 | Egypt | A 14-year-old Christian girl was abducted after her family was suspected of harboring a convert from Islam. | - | |
| 19 April 2009 | Hegaza, Egypt | Armed individuals open fire during Easter Eve, resulting in two Christian deaths and one injury. | 2 dead, 1 injured | |
| 7 January 2010 | Naga Hammadi, Egypt | Gunmen open fire on Christian worshippers leaving a Christmas service. Six Christians and one Muslim police officer are killed. | 7 dead | |
| 1 January 2011 | Alexandria, Egypt | A car bomb detonates outside a Christian church shortly after a New Year’s Eve service concludes. One week later, thousands of Muslims stood as human shields outside churches during Christmas Mass on 6–7 January 2011. | 21 dead, 79 injured | |
| 11 January 2011 | Samalut, Egypt | A police officer opens fire on a train, killing a 71-year-old Christian man and injuring five others. | 1 dead, 5 injured | |
| 30 January 2011 | Egypt | Following political unrest, attackers enter Christian homes and kill 11 people. | 11 dead, 4 injured | |
| 5 March 2011 | Cairo, Egypt | A church is set on fire after a personal dispute involving an interfaith relationship. Subsequent protests occur. | 1 church destroyed | |
| 7 May 2011 | Cairo, Egypt | Multiple churches and Christian homes are attacked; 15 people are killed and over 200 injured. | 15 dead, 232 injured | |
| 18 May 2011 | Cairo, Egypt | A Christian church converted from a factory is attacked by a mob; two Christians are later sentenced. | - | |
| 18 September 2012 | Sohag, Egypt | A Christian schoolteacher is sentenced to six years in prison for posting allegedly defamatory images. | - | |
| April 2013 | Cairo, Egypt | Clashes erupt following a Christian funeral, resulting in multiple deaths. | 6 dead | |
| July 2013 | Egypt | Widespread attacks on Christian churches and individuals following the ousting of President Morsi. | At least 45 dead | |
| 6 July 2013 | El Arish, Egypt | Fr. Mina Aboud, a Christian priest, is killed. | 1 dead | |
| March 2014 | Cairo, Egypt | Mary Sameh George, a Christian woman, is killed after being identified by a cross in her car. | 1 dead | |
| December 2014 | Libya | A Christian doctor and his family are killed; the motive is determined to be religious. | 3 dead | |
| 15 February 2015 | Sirte, Libya | Video shows the beheading of 21 Christians by ISIS. | 21 dead | |
| February 2016 | Minya, Egypt | Three Christian teenagers are sentenced to five years in prison for appearing in a video allegedly mocking Islam. | - | |
| 26 May 2016 | Minya, Egypt | A Christian woman is assaulted and paraded through the streets by a mob after her son is accused of having a relationship with a Muslim woman. | - | |
| 11 December 2016 | Cairo, Egypt | A suicide bombing at a Christian church kills 29 and injures 47. | 29 dead, 47 injured | |
| February 2017 | El Arish, Egypt | Seven Christians are killed in separate incidents. | 7 dead | |
| 9 April 2017 | Tanta and Alexandria, Egypt | Bombings target churches during Palm Sunday services. | 45+ dead, 130+ injured | |
| 7 May 2017 | El Arish, Egypt | A Christian man is killed by suspected ISIL militants. | 1 dead | |
| 26 May 2017 | Minya, Egypt | Gunmen attack a bus carrying Christian pilgrims to a monastery. | 28 dead | |
| 12 October 2017 | Cairo, Egypt | A Christian priest is killed in a knife attack. | 1 dead | |
| 29 December 2017 | Cairo, Egypt | A gunman opens fire at a church and nearby shop. | 11 dead | |
| 1 January 2018 | Giza, Egypt | Two Christian brothers are shot outside a liquor store. | 2 dead | |
| 15 January 2018 | El Arish, Egypt | A Christian man is shot in the head by ISIL after being asked his religion. | 1 dead | |
| 2 November 2018 | Minya, Egypt | Gunmen ambush a bus of Christian pilgrims. | 7 dead, 7 injured | |
| 12 December 2018 | Minya, Egypt | A police officer kills a Christian man and his son. | 2 dead | |
| 5 October 2020 | Samalut, Egypt | A mob attacks Christian homes following a local altercation. | Several injured | |
| 18 April 2021 | Bir al-Abd, Egypt | ISIL releases video of a Christian man being executed after five months in captivity. | 1 dead | |
| 27 May 2021 | Egypt | A Christian monk is executed following conviction for killing an abbot; allegations of torture are raised. | 1 dead | |
| 19 July 2021 | Surrey, Canada | A Coptic Orthodox church is burned down amid a string of arsons targeting churches. | - | |
| 7 April 2022 | Alexandria, Egypt | Fr. Arsanios Wadid is fatally stabbed in the street. | 1 dead | |
| 3 November 2024 | Minya, Egypt | Christians are attacked by a group of Muslims during a local dispute. | Unknown | |
| 3 January 2026 | Egypt | Coptic YouTuber Augustinos Samaan was sentenced to five years in prison with hard labor and immediate enforcement on charges of "contempt of religion and misuse of social media". | – | |

=== Abductions and forced conversions ===
Agape Girgis, a 13-year-old Egyptian girl, was reportedly abducted from Amreya, near Alexandria, on December 23, 2012, according to the Assyrian International News Agency.

There have been documented reports of abductions of Christian women and girls in Egypt, often involving allegations of forced conversion to Islam and subsequent marriages to Muslim men.

A 2009 study by the Washington, D.C.-based organization Christian Solidarity International reported that victims often face significant legal and social barriers to returning to Christianity once converted. Allegations of organized abductions, human trafficking, and complicity by local authorities have continued into the 2010s.

In April 2010, a bipartisan group of 17 members of the U.S. Congress submitted a letter to the State Department's Office to Monitor and Combat Trafficking in Persons, citing reports of Christian women subjected to physical and sexual violence, captivity, and forced domestic servitude, often for the financial benefit of individuals facilitating conversions.

According to the Egyptian NGO Association of Victims of Abduction and Forced Disappearance, approximately 550 Christian girls were abducted between 2011 and March 2014. The group claims that a significant proportion were subjected to sexual assault and subsequently forced to marry their abductors after converting to Islam.

Reports published in 2017 and 2018 suggest that such incidents may have increased with the rise of Salafist networks under the administration of President Abdel Fattah el-Sisi. Some sources allege that financial incentives, up to $3,000 per case, have been offered to individuals for the abduction and forced conversion of Christian women.

== See also ==
- Christianity in Egypt
- Human rights in Egypt#Freedom of religion
- Human rights in the Middle East
- Human rights in Muslim-majority countries
- Persecution of Christians
- Religion in Egypt
- Christianity and Islam
- Controversies related to Islam and Muslims
- Anti-Oriental Orthodox sentiment

== Bibliography ==
- Haddad, Yvonne; Donovan, Joshua (2013). "Good Copt, Bad Copt: Competing Narratives on Coptic Identity in Egypt and the United States". Studies in World Christianity. 19 (3): 208–232. doi:10.3366/swc.2013.0058. - Print ISSN 1354-9901 Online ISSN 1750-0230
- Little, Donald P. (1976). "Coptic Conversion to Islam under the Baḥrī Mamlūks, 692-755/1293-1354". Bulletin of the School of Oriental and African Studies, University of London. 39 (3): 552–569. doi:10.1017/S0041977X00051004. ISSN 0041-977X. JSTOR 614714. S2CID 170719417.
- Meri, Josef W. (2005). Medieval Islamic Civilization. Routledge. ISBN 9780415966900.
- Meyendorff, John (1989). Imperial unity and Christian divisions: The Church 450-680 A.D. The Church in history. Vol. 2. Crestwood, NY: St. Vladimir's Seminary Press. ISBN 9780881410556.
- Ostrogorsky, George (1956). History of the Byzantine State. Oxford: Basil Blackwell.
- Stillman, Norman (8 June 2022). Arab Dress, A Short History: From the Dawn of Islam to Modern Times. BRILL. pp. 104–106. ISBN 978-90-04-49162-5.
- Thomas, David; Roggema, Barbara (2009), Christian-Muslim Relations. A Bibliographical History. Volume 1 (600-900), BRILL, ISBN 9789004169753
