= Timeline of the Sinai insurgency =

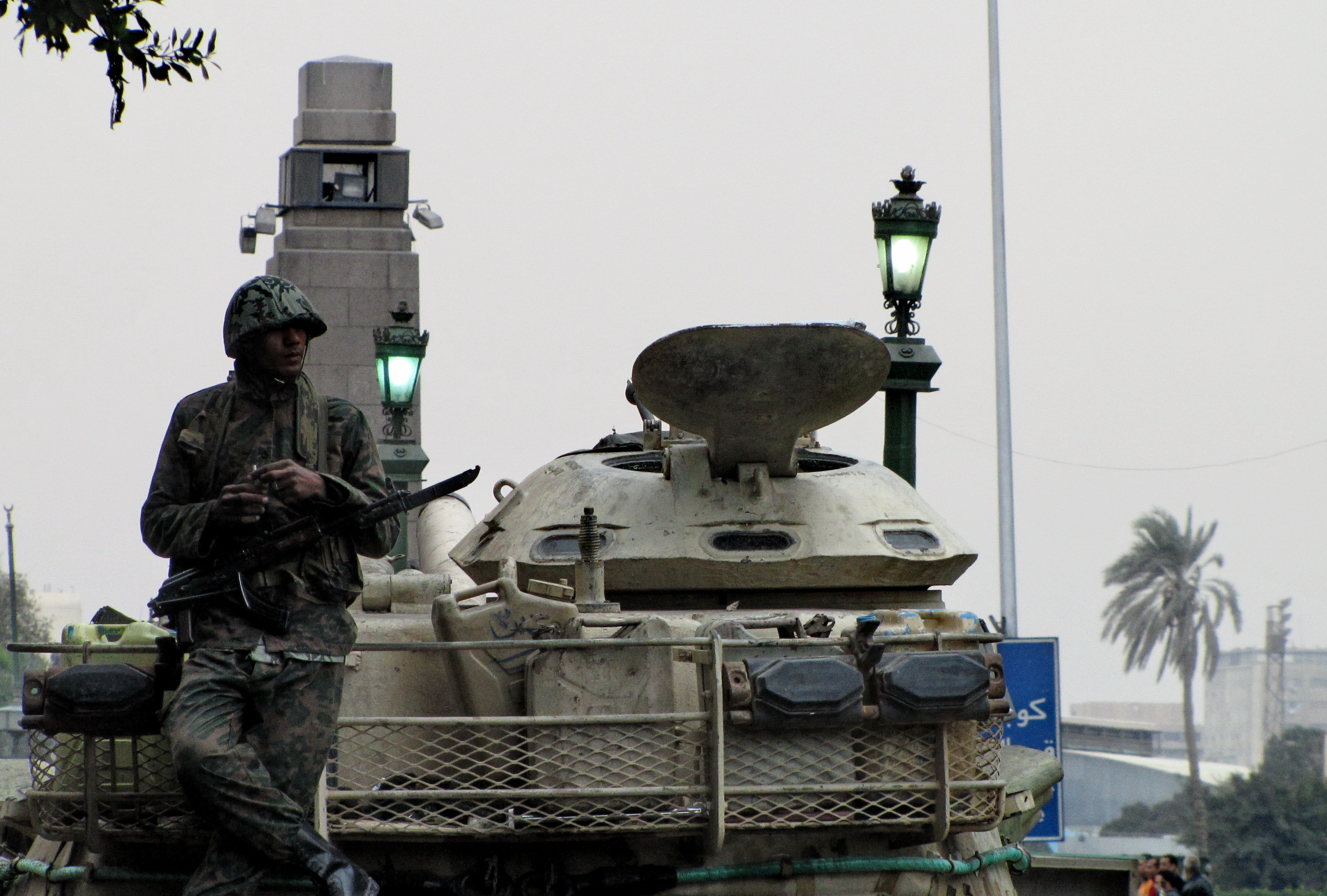
An Egyptian soldier atop a tank in Tahrir Square, during the 2011 Sinai Insurgency

The following is a chronological timeline of fatal incidents during the Sinai insurgency. The Sinai insurgency was invigorated by a period of relative instability and political turmoil in Egypt, beginning with the 2011 uprising against former autocrat Hosni Mubarak. Insurgent attacks, however, intensified significantly following the July 2013 coup that ousted Muslim Brotherhood-backed president Mohamed Morsi and subsequent crackdown on his supporters.

== 2011 ==
- 30 July 2011 - 6 Egyptian security forces killed.
- 14 August–September 2011, Operation Eagle: 1 Islamist militant and 2 civilians killed.
  - 15 August 2011 - 1 Islamist militant killed, 6 captured.
  - 17 August 2011 - 2 Bedouins killed in unclear circumstances.
- 18 August 2011 - 6 Israeli civilians and two soldiers and 5 Egyptian soldiers killed, as well as 10 attackers.

== 2012 ==
=== March ===
- 27 March 2012 - 2 smugglers killed.

=== April ===
- 15 April 2012 - 2 policemen killed.

=== May ===
- 2 May 2012 – 1 policeman killed.
- 19 May 2012 – 1 tribe chief killed.

=== June ===
- 4 June 2012 – one policeman killed.
- 18 June 2012 – one Israeli civilian killed and two wounded by an attack on Israeli-Egyptian border fence.

=== August ===
- 5 August 2012 - 16 Egyptian soldiers and 8 militants killed.
- 7 August 2012, Operation Sinai (2012) - 32 militants and suspects killed, 38 arrested; 2 civilians killed (by early September 2012).
  - 8 August 2012 – 20 militants killed in Sinai.
  - 12 August 2012 – 7 suspected militants killed.
  - 13 August 2012 – Armed men shot dead tribal leader Khalaf Al-Menahy and his son.
  - 29 August 2012 – Egyptian Army tanks and helicopters attack Jihadi cells, resulting in 11 dead militants and 23 more taken prisoner with no reported military casualties.

=== September ===
- 16 September 2012 - 1 Egyptian soldier killed.
- 21 September 2012 - 1 Israeli soldier and 3 militants killed.

=== November ===
- 3 November 2012 - 3 policemen killed.

== 2013 ==
=== April ===
- 16 April 2013 - 1 policeman killed.

=== May ===
- 7 May 2013 - 1 civilian killed.
- 21 May 2013 - 1 militant killed.

=== July ===
- June–July 2013 - 1 Egyptian soldier and 20 gunmen killed in clashes.
- 3 to 15 July 2013 - Following the ouster of President Morsi, 8 policemen, 2 Christians, one a priest, and five civilians have been killed in attacks by Islamist militants in the Sinai peninsula.
- 16–17 July 2013 - 10 militants killed.
- 17 July 2013 - 3 policemen killed.
- 18 July 2013 - 1 policeman killed.
- 19 July 2013 - 2 civilians killed.
- 21 July 2013 - 2 civilians, 2 officers, and 2 policemen killed.
- 22 July 2013 - 1 civilian killed.
- 24 July 2013 - 2 soldiers and 3 jihadists killed.
- 26 July 2013 - 1 civilian killed.
- 27–28 July 2013 - 10 militants killed.
- 28 July 2013 - 1 officer killed.
- 29 July 2013 - 4 soldiers killed.
- 30 July 2013 - 1 soldier killed.

=== August ===
- 2 August 2013 - 1 policeman killed.
- 5 August 2013 - 1 soldier killed.
- 7 August 2013 - 1 civilian killed.
- 9 August 2013 - 4 militants killed.
- 11 August 2013 - 12 militants killed.
- 14 August 2013 - 2 policemen and 1 army colonel killed.
- 15 August 2013 - 8 soldiers killed by insurgents near Arish.
- 17 August 2013 - 6 people killed.
- 18 August 2013 - 1 soldier killed.
- 19 August 2013 - 25 off service unarmed Central Security Forces soldiers were ambushed and executed by insurgents.
- 30 August 2013 - 3 militants, 2 policemen and one police chief were killed in separate attacks.

=== September ===
- 3 September 2013 - 15 militants killed.
- 4 September 2013 - 2 conscripts killed.
- 7 September 2013 - At least 31 militants killed.
- 11 September 2013 - 6 soldiers killed.
- 30 September 2013 - 3 policemen, 1 soldier, and 1 civilian killed.

=== October ===
- 7 October 2013 - A car bomb killed three police officers in southern Sinai, hours after masked gunmen shot dead six soldiers in a patrol car outside the Suez Canal city of Ismailiya.
- 10 October 2013 - A suicide bomber rammed his explosives-laden car into a checkpoint outside the city of al-Arish in Egypt's Sinai Peninsula, killing three soldiers and a policeman.
- 17 October 2013 - 6 militants killed.
- 18 October 2013 - 1 policeman killed.
- 21 October 2013 - 1 civilian killed.
- 22 October 2013 - One officer and a civilian driver killed.
- 23 October 2013 - 1 soldier killed.

=== November ===
- 6 November 2013 - 1 soldier killed and 3 Islamist militants killed.
- 7 November 2013 - 8 militants killed.
- 13 November 2013 - 2 militants killed.
- 14 November 2013 - 3 militants and two policeman killed.
- 15 November 2013 - 1 policeman killed.
- 16 November 2013 - 1 police officer shot dead in North Sinai.
- 20 November 2013 - 11 soldiers killed near el-Arish.
- 30 November 2013 - 3 militants killed.

=== December ===
- 9 December 2013 - Leading member of Ansar Bait al-Maqdis, Abu Suhaib, killed while shooting at police, 22 suspected militants captured.
- 10 December 2013 - Wanted Ansar Bait al-Maqdis militant, Abdulrahman Salama Salem Abu Eita captured.
- 13 December 2013 - Wanted Islamist militant, Ahmed Ahmeed Abu Sreig, killed.
- 15 December 2013 - Wanted Islamist militant, Nesar Sabah Robaa Saleh, killed in Al-Arish, 40 suspected captured.
- 16 December 2013 - Wanted militant named Abu Khaled was killed, 7 wanted militants and 20 suspected militants captured.
- 17 December 2013 - Wanted Islamist killed in Sinai.
- 18 December 2013 - 2 militants killed, 12 militants captured.
- 19 December 2013 - Two militants killed.
- 20 December 2013 - Two soldiers and 3 militants killed.
- 22 December 2013 - 4 militants killed and 4 suspected militants captured.
- 24 December 2013 - 14 police officers and 2 civilians killed in an attack on a major police station.

== 2014 ==
=== January ===
- 4 January 2014 - 1 soldier killed.
- 13 January 2014 - 2 militants killed by their own bomb; approximately 5 militants killed in unclear circumstances.
- 16 January 2014 - 1 militant killed.
- 17 January 2014 - 13 militants killed.
- 18 January 2014 - 3 militants killed.
- 19 January 2014 - 1 militant killed.
- 25 January 2014 - 5 soldiers killed in attack on helicopter.
- 26 January 2014 - 4 soldiers killed.
- 29 January 2014 - 10 militants killed.
- 30 January 2014 - 7 militants and one police officer killed.
- 31 January 2014 - 13 militants killed.

=== February ===
- 1 February 2014 - 2 militants killed.
- 3 February 2014 - 30 militants killed.
- 7 February 2014 - 20 militants killed.
- 9 February 2014 - 3 militants killed.
- 16 February 2014 - 4 civilians (including 3 South Koreans) killed in the 2014 Taba bus bombing.
- 20 February - 10 militants killed.
- 21–23 February - 14 militants killed.

=== March ===
- 1 March - 10 militants killed.
- 6 March - 1 policeman killed.
- 11 March - 7 militants killed.
- 17 March - 3 militants killed.
- 24 March - 3 militants killed.
- 30 March 2014 - 1 soldier killed.

=== April ===
- 1 April 2014 - 3 militants killed.
- 3 April 2014 - 1 CSF officer killed.
- 5 April 2014. - 4 militants killed.
- 11 April 2014 - 1 militant killed.
- 13 April 2014 - 3 militants killed.
- 16 April 2014 - 2 militants killed.
- 24 April 2014 - 6 militants killed.
- 27 April 2014 - 1 militant killed.
- 29 April 2014 - 3 militants killed.

=== May ===
- 1 May 2014 - 5 militants killed.
- 2 May 2014 - 2 killed in suicide bombing in El-Tor; 1 killed in suicide bombing near Sharm el-Sheikh.
- 11 May 2014 - 1 army conscript killed in shooting in Sheikh Zuweid.
- 14 May 2014 - 2 militants killed.
- 20 May 2014 - 6 militants killed.
- 22 May 2014 - 3 militants killed by suspected tribesmen.
- 23 May 2014 - 1 CSF officer killed.
- 28 May 2014 - 1 soldier killed.

=== June ===
- 5 June 2014 - 7 militants killed.
- 8 June 2014 - 1 civilian killed.
- 11 June 2014 - 1 soldier killed.
- 16 June 2014 - 8 extremists killed.
- 21 June 2014 - 8 militants killed.
- 22 June 2014 - 19 militants killed.
- 28 June 2014 - Militants killed four members of the Central Security Forces. Armed assailants shot at a police officer in his car in Al-Arish. Two men accompanying the officer were killed while he survived unscathed.

=== July ===
- 3 July 2014 - A raid carried out by the Egyptian army in North Sinai killed 17 Islamic militants.
- 9 July 2014 - 1 soldier killed.
- 14 July 2014 - 1 soldier and 7 civilians, including two children, were killed in two separate mortar attacks.
- 15 July 2014 - 7 militants and one soldier killed.
- 18 July 2014 - 1 police officer killed.
- 21 July 2014 - 2 tribal leaders killed.
- 22 July 2014 - 1 security guard killed.
- 23 July 2014 - 2 militants killed.
- 24 July 2014 - 3 militants killed including Khaled el-Manaei brother of Shadi el-Manaei.
- 25 July 2014 - 2 CSF officers killed.
- 26 July 2014 - 12 militants were killed during an Egyptian Army raid near Sheikh Zuweid, while 4 children were killed in Rafah due to a rocket attack by suspected militants.
- 27 July 2014 - 14 militants killed by Egyptian security forces during raids on their hideouts in Sheikh Zuweid and Rafah.
- 29 July 2014 - A girl was killed by a rocket.

=== August ===
- 3 August 2014 - 5 militants killed in a military operation, during which security forces managed to destroy many of the militants' vehicles. A six-year-old boy was killed when a rocket that was meant to target a security convoy hit his house, injuring four others.
- 4 August 2014 - 11 militants were killed during a military raid in several districts of North Sinai near the border with Israel. Three tunnels and a number of vehicles were destroyed in the process.
- 8 August 2014 - 11 militants killed.
- 11 August 2014 - 2 militants killed.
- 12 August 2014 - 9 alleged militants were killed by Egyptian army troops in North Sinai.
- 12 August 2014 - Two militants killed.
- 14 August 2014 - 2 militants killed.
- approximately 18 August 2014 - 4 civilians killed.
- 19 August 2014 - 2 militants killed.
- 20 August 2014 - 2 militants killed.
- 24 August 2014 - 14 militants killed.
- 31 August 2014 - 2 militants and one civilian killed. One of the militants was Fayez Abu-Sheta the key suspect in the kidnapping of a number of security personnel last year.

=== September ===
- 1 September 2014 - 6 militants killed.
- 2 September 2014 - 11 policemen and 7 militants killed.
- 3 September 2014 - 1 policeman killed.
- 5 September 2014 - 3 militants killed.
- 8 September 2014 - 1 police officer killed.
- 9 September 2014 - 2 militants and one civilian killed.
- 11 September 2014 - 1 civilian killed.
- 12 September 2014 - 1 army conscript killed.
- 13 September 2014 - 6 militants killed.
- 14 September 2014 - 4 militants killed.
- 16 September 2014 - 6 police killed.
- 19 September 2014 - A decapitated man was found in Sheikh Zuweid.
- 20 September 2014 - 1 militant killed.
- 21 September 2014 - 1 police officer killed.
- 22 September 2014 - 7 militants killed.
- 23 September 2014 - 4 militants killed.
- Approximately 26 September 2014 - 1 civilian killed.
- 27 September 2014 - 18 militants killed.

=== October ===
- 1 October 2014 - 7 militants killed.
- 2 October 2014 - 1 militant commander killed.
- 3 October 2014 - 2 militants killed.
- 5 October 2014 - Three people beheaded and one shot to death by Ansar Bait al-Maqdis.
- 6 October 2014 - A 13-year-old boy was killed by an IED.
- 7 October 2014 - 17 militants killed.
- 9 October 2014 - 15 militants killed.
- 10 October 2014 - Shehata Farhan a top member of Ansar Bait al-Maqdis was killed.
- 12 October 2014 - 3 dead bodies found south of Al Arish city.
- 16 October 2014 - 3 policemen killed in a RPG attack.
- 17 October 2014 - Ansar Bait al-Maqdis leader captured in Arish and 3 killed in an IED attack.
- 18 October 2014 - 2 militants killed. 3 officers killed while destroying a tunnel.
- 19 October 2014 - 7 army officers killed.
- 21 October 2014 - 1 civilian killed.
- 22 October 2014 - 2 Israeli soldiers injured.
- 24 October 2014 - 33 security personnel killed.
- 26 October 2014 - 7 militants killed.
- 30 October 2014 - 3 militants killed.
- 31 October 2014 - 7 military personnel injured and 1 civilian killed.

=== November ===
- 3 November 2014 - 3 militants killed.
- 6 November 2014 - 4 civilians killed.
- 7 November 2014 - 5 militants killed.
- 8 November 2014 - 8 militants killed.
- 13 November 2014 - 3 soldiers and 2 police killed.
- 14 November 2014 - 5 militants killed.
- 15 November 2014 - 3 militants killed.
- 18 November 2014 - 7 civilians and 3 militants killed.
- 21 November 2014 - 2 militants killed in an explosion, while 5 other militants were killed in security raids.
- 22 November 2014 - 10 militants killed.
- 23 November 2014 - 11 militants and 1 policeman killed.
- 25 November 2014 - 5 militants killed.
- 26 November 2014 - 3 policemen and 9 militants killed.
- 27 November 2014 - 3 civilians found dead.
- 28 November 2014 - 6 army personnel injured.

=== December ===
- 2 December 2014 - 6 civilians found dead.
- 4 December 2014 - 2 civilians found dead.
- 10 December 2014 - 5 militants killed.
- 12 December 2014 - 17 militants killed.
- 14 December 2014 - 2 police officers killed.
- 15 December 2014 - 3 militants killed.
- 17 December 2014 - 5 militants killed.
- 18 December 2014 - 9 militants killed.
- 19 December 2014 - 1 militants killed.
- 20 December 2014 - 6 militants killed.
- 21 December 2014 - 7 militants and 4 civilians killed.
- 25 December 2014 - 1 militant killed.
- 26 December 2014 - 2 army personnel killed.
- 28 December 2014 - 2 militants killed.

== 2015 ==
=== January ===
- 2 January 2015 - 1 militant killed.
- 4 January 2015 - 1 soldier killed.
- 10 January 2015 - 2 civilians found dead.
- 12 January 2015 - 7 civilians found dead.
- 13 January 2014 - Kidnapped police officer found dead. and 5 civilians killed.
- 14 January 2015 - 7 militants killed.
- 15 January 2015 - 1 army officer and 3 civilians killed.
- 16 January 2015 - 1 civilian killed.
- 19–20 January 2015 - 4 militants killed.
- 26 January 2015 - 3 militants killed and 3 civilians found dead.
- 29 January 2015 - 44 killed including 24 soldiers, 14 civilians and 6 policemen; 1 civilian found dead; 2 militants killed.
- 30 January 2015 - 2 civilians and 3 militants killed.

=== February ===
- 1 February 2015 - 3 civilians killed.
- 2 February 2015 - 1 civilian killed.
- 3 February 2015 - 8 militants killed.
- 5 February 2015 - 1 conscript killed.
- 6 February 2015 - 47 militants killed and 1 civilian killed.
- 9 February 2015 - 1 civilian killed.
- 10 February 2015 - 15 militants killed.
- 11 February 2015 - 3 militants killed.
- 13 February 2015 - 18 militants killed.
- 16 February 2015 - 6 militants killed.
- 18 February 2015 - 5 militants killed and 1 civilian killed.
- 25 February 2015 - 38 militants killed.
- 28 February 2015 - 28 militants killed and 1 civilian killed.

According to an official army spokesman statement, a total of 173 militants were killed in February 2015.

=== March ===
- 2 March 2015 - 8 militants killed.
- 3 March 2015 - 11 militants killed.
- 5 March 2015 - 15 militants killed.
- 6 March 2015 - 10 militants killed.
- 7 March 2015 - 15 militants killed.
- 9 March 2015 - 3 policemen killed.
- 10 March 2015 - 1 army officer and 1 civilian killed in two separate attacks; 9 militants killed.
- 11 March 2015 - 1 army officer killed and 11 militants killed.
- 12 March 2015 - 5 civilians found dead.
- 13 March 2015 - 19 militants killed.
- 16 March 2015 - 3 civilians found dead.
- 17 March 2015 - 9 militants killed and 1 civilian found dead.
- 19 March 2015 - 28 militants killed.
- 20 March 2015 - 8 militants killed.
- 21 March 2015 - 10 militants killed.
- 22 March 2015 - 7 militants killed.
- 24 March 2015 - 2 soldiers and a policeman killed.
- 25 March 2015 - 7 militants killed.
- 28 March 2015 - 3 militants killed.
- 30 March 2015 - 6 militants killed.
- 31 March 2015 - 3 militants killed.

=== April ===
- 2 April 2015 - 16 soldiers, 2 civilians and 15 militants killed.
- 4 April 2015 - 35 militants killed.
- 8 April 2015 - 10 militants, 2 policemen and 11 civilians killed.
- 12 April 2015 - 6 soldiers, 5 policemen and 1 civilian killed.
- 13 April 2015 - 1 conscript killed.
- 16 April 2015 - 1 soldier and 3 militants killed.
- 17 April 2015 - 10 militants killed.
- 20 April 2015 - 3 policemen, 2 civilians killed.
- 26 April 2015 - 17 militants killed.

=== May ===
According to an official army spokesman statement, a total number of 141 militants were killed in May 2015.

- 2 May 2015 - 29 militants killed.
- 6 May 2015 - 21 militants killed.
- 7 May 2015 - 2 policemen killed.
- 13 May 2015 - 4 soldiers and 3 civilians killed.
- 16 May 2015 - 4 civilians, including 3 judges, killed.
- 19 May 2015 - 5 militants killed.
- 25 May 2015 - 1 soldier killed.
- 27 May 2015 - 1 policeman killed.

=== June ===
- 10 June 2015 - 16 militants and 1 soldier killed.
- 17 June 2015 - 7 militants and 1 soldier killed.
- 22 June 2015 - 22 militants killed.

=== July ===
- On 6 July 2015, an Egyptian army statement claimed that 241 militants were killed during anti-terror operation between 1 and 5 July.
  - 1 July 2015 - 17 soldiers and 100 militants killed.
  - 2 July 2015 - 22 militants killed.
  - 3 July 2015 - The Wilayah Sinai group claimed to have shot 3 grad rockets on 3 July 2015 from Sinai to southern Israel near the Gaza Strip. Two rocket hits were confirmed in Eshkol, which did not result in any injury or property damage. Israel did not respond to the attack.
  - 4 July 2015 - 3 civilians killed.
  - 5 July 2015 - 29 militants killed.
- 15 July 2015 - 20 militants killed.
- On 16 July 2015, the group claimed responsibility for a rocket attack at an Egyptian Navy patrol boat along the northern coast of Sinai, close to the Gaza Strip.
- 18 July 2015 - 3 soldiers and 59 militants killed.
- Egypt's military announced in a statement on 2 August 2015, that 88 militants were killed between 20 and 31 July.
  - 23 July 2015 - 4 soldiers killed.
  - 24 July 2015 - 12 militants killed.
  - 31 July 2015 - 20 militants killed.

=== August ===
- 1 August 2015 - 1 militant, Selim Suleiman Al-Haram, identified by the Egyptian army as one of the top leaders of Wilayat Sinai, was killed during an exchange of fire between him and soldiers who surrounded his residence.
- 9 August - 2 police officer were killed by militant in the northeastern province of Suez.

=== September ===
- Operation Martyr's Right:
  - 11 September 2015 - 4 soldiers, 2 civilians killed.
  - 12 September 2015 - 98 militants killed.
  - 15 September 2015 - 55 militants, 2 soldiers killed
  - 17 September 2015 - 1 officer killed.
  - 26 September 2015 - 2 officers killed.

=== October ===
- 14 October 2015 - A suspected ISIL attack on a security checkpoint in North Sinai Governorate, Egypt, leaves at least 12 Egyptian military personnel and 15 terrorists dead.
- 15 October 2015 - Egyptian government airstrikes on jihadist targets in North Sinai Governorate, leave at least 100 terrorists killed and 40 others wounded.
- 31 October 2015 - The group claimed responsibility for bringing down Russian aircraft Metrojet Flight 9268, carrying 224 passengers. It was flying to Saint Petersburg from Sharm-el-Sheikh when it broke up over Hasna (Egypt), killing all on board. Data obtained from the airplane black boxes gives credence to the idea that there was a bomb attack.

=== November ===
- 10 November 2015 - one of the group's leaders, Ashraf Ali Hassanein Gharabali, was shot and killed in a shoot-out with Egyptian security forces in Cairo. The Egyptian Interior Ministry linked Gharabali to a string of attacks including an assassination attempt on the Interior Minister.
- 17 November 2015 - Russian President Vladimir Putin confirmed that a bomb attack brought down the Russian aircraft Metrojet Flight 9268.

=== December ===
- 8 December 2015 - a bomb in Rafah killed four soldiers and injured four others.
- 12 December 2015 - a bomb in Arish killed a soldier.

== 2016 ==
=== January ===
- 7 January 2016 - The group claimed responsibility for an attack on the Arab gas pipeline.

=== March ===
- 19 March 2016 - an attack on a checkpoint in Arish killed 13 policemen.

=== April ===
- 7 April 2016 - an attack killed 15 soldiers and two civilians.

=== May ===
- 30 May 2016 - 88 militants were killed and many supply caches were destroyed in an air attack on Jabal Halal.

=== June ===
- 28 June 2016 - A series of air strikes killed 33 ISIS fighters and injured 50 others.

=== August ===
- 4 August 2016 - Egyptian military spokesperson said that Abu Doaa Al-Ansari, the leader of the North Sinai-based group that is affiliated with ISIS, was killed along with 45 other militants in air strikes in the south and south-west of El-Arish.

=== September ===
- 4 September 2016 - The army reported another 40 militants killed by airstrikes in September.

=== October ===
- 1 October 2016 - 5 police conscripts killed.
- 14 October 2016 - 12 soldiers and 15 militants killed.
- 17 October 2016 - Clashes in North Sinai Governorate left 3 soldiers and 18 insurgents dead.
- 30 October 2016 - A military operation in North Sinai Governorate left 4 soldiers and 6 insurgents dead.

=== November ===
- 5 November 2016 - In North Sinai Governorate Egyptian soldiers killed at least 11 terrorist.
- 10 November 2016 - Soldiers killed at least 6 insurgents in North Sinai Governorate

== 2017 ==
=== January ===
- 16 January - Bombing left one dead and 2 injured in Arish.
- 17 January - Insurgents kills at least 8 police in New Valley governorate.
- 20 January - Terrorist shoot dead a civilian in the city of Arish.
- 23 January - Insurgents kills at least 5 Egyptian soldiers.
- 25 January - Soldiers kills at least 3 terrorists.

=== February ===
- 9 February - ISIL-linked operatives launched four Grad rockets from Egyptian territory in Sinai peninsula on the Israeli southernmost city of Eilat, prompting Israeli Iron Dome system to intercept three of the rockets, with no physical casualties or damage reported, though 11 civilians were brought to Eilat Josephtal Hospital to be treated for shock.

=== March ===
- 9 March - Two police officers were killed and four wounded after an IED exploded near a security convoy in Arish.
- 18 March - Egyptian military killed 18 militants during recent air raids in North Sinai province.
- 20 March - Three people were killed and 11 others injured in two attacks across Sinai province, according to a local security source. No group has claimed responsibility for the attacks.
- 23 March - Ten Egyptian soldiers and two policemen have been killed by two car bomb explosions in central Sinai during an operation against militants. Fifteen militants were also killed and seven others arrested, the military said in a statement.
- 26 March - Army forces thwarted an ambush by militants in Rafah city, killing eight militants.
- 27 March - An army soldier was killed when gunmen opened fire on a military checkpoint in Sheikh Zuweid. No group claimed responsibility for the attack.

=== April ===
- 3 April - A police officer was injured when he thwarted a terrorist attack on a security checkpoint in Arish.
- 18 April - A suicide bomber detonated at a checkpoint near a church in Southern Sinai, killing an officer and wounding four others.
- 21 April - It was reported on 21 April 2017 that an Egyptian air raid killed 19 ISIL fighters, including three unnamed leaders.
- 27 April - An Islamic State suicide bomber killed four members of a Bedouin tribe and wounded others in Rafah.

=== May ===
- 20 May - Two civilians were abducted and beheaded in Rafah and Arish, a security source said. In another incident, seven gunmen were killed by army shelling in southern Rafah.

=== July ===
- 22 July - 30 militants killed and four vehicles destroyed in airstrikes in Arish, Sheikh Zuweid and Rafah in the northern Sinai peninsula.

=== September ===
- 12 September - At least 18 Egyptian policemen killed and three injured in an attack near Arish claimed by Islamic State.

=== November ===
- 24 November 2017 - In bir al-Abed attack jihadists killed 311 people and injured at least 122.

=== December ===
- 19 December 2017 - one officer was killed and two were injured in a failed assassination attempt on the Minister of Interior Magdi Abdel-Ghaffar and the minister of defense Sedki Sobhy.
- 20 December 2017 - 5 ISIS militants were killed and an army captain was killed.

== 2018 ==
=== January ===
- 3 January - Bomb leaves one police officer dead in North Sinai.
- 4 January - Three police officers and one civilian killed in an ambush outside of el-Arish.
- 9 January - Egyptian forces kill 8 suspected militants in a shootout in el-Arish.
- 17 January - Egyptian army kills one suspected terrorist and arrests 22 others in North Sinai.
- 23 January - Egyptian army kills two suspected militants in raids on hideouts in North Sinai.

=== February ===
- 1 February - A Central Security Forces conscript is killed and another wounded after militants opened fire on a police checkpoint in south el-Arish.
- 4 February - Roadside bomb kills two Egyptian security officials just south of el-Arish.
- 11 February - Egyptian military says 16 militants were killed and four arrested in a major security operation, and that 66 targets, arms depots and SUVs and motor-bikes used by militants were destroyed in raids focused mainly in Sinai, but also including parts of the Nile Delta and the western desert.
- 19 February - 3 Egyptian soldiers and four militants affiliated with Islamic State killed in Sinai during government operation.
- 27 February - Two Egyptian soldiers and one officer killed while fighting militants in northern Sinai.

=== March ===
- 4 March - 4 Egyptian soldiers and ten militants killed in el-Arish.
- 11 March - 2 Egyptian soldiers and 16 militants killed during military operation.
- 19 March - 4 Egyptian soldiers and 36 militants killed.
- 31 March - 2 Egyptian soldiers and 6 militants reported killed in northern Sinai.

=== April ===
- 14 April - 8 Egyptian troops killed and 15 wounded, 14 militants dead after attack on a military base in central Sinai.
- 25 April - Egyptian army reports 30 militants and 3 soldiers killed.

=== May ===
- 29 May - 8 militants and 2 soldiers killed in crackdown on Sinai's western border.

=== August ===
- 19 August - A car bomb kills one military officer and wounds 4 conscripts south of el-Arish.
- 25 August - 4 soldiers and 4 militants killed in clashes at a chechttps://www.arabnews.com/node/1527531/middle-eastkpoint in el-Arish city, another 10 soldiers reported wounded.

=== September ===
- 7 Sept - A car bomb detonates during vehicle inspection, killing a colonel at Jabal al Halal. Another car bomb detonates and injures a soldier near Sheikh Zuweld.
- 29 Sep - Ambush on Egyptian security forces leaves 7 soldiers and one civilian dead

=== October ===
- 20 October - Militants open fire on workers building a security wall in el-Arish, killing 3 workers and a fourth worker injured, counter-terrorism operations afterwards resulted in 6 militants dead.
- 25 October - A roadside bomb strikes workers building a security wall in el-Arish, killing 3 workers and injuring 10 more. The attack is blamed on the Islamic State.

=== December ===
- 28 December - An explosion hits a bus near the Giza pyramids kills 3 Vietnamese tourists and an Egyptian guide and 11 others wounded. No-one claimed responsibility.

== 2019 ==
=== May ===
- 27 May - Egyptian army claims 47 militants and 5 Egyptian soldiers killed during Egypt's ongoing military offensive in Sinai. The announcement did not specify when the deaths took place.

=== June ===
- 5 June - Militants kill at least 8 Egyptian policemen at a checkpoint in Sinai.

=== July ===
- 18 July - Bombing in Sheikh Zuwaid kills 2, including security officer and injures another.

=== September ===
- 14 September - Militants open fire on a checkpoint in El Arish, killing 3 security forces and injuring 2 others; 3 militants are also killed in the attack.
- 27 September - An ambush in Bir el-Abed leaves at least 7 soldiers and 1 civilian dead, and 2 soldiers wounded.

=== October ===
- 29 October - 2 soldiers killed in an ambush in Sheikh Zuwaid

== 2020 ==
=== January ===
- 4 January - ISIL-SP released photos documenting the execution of two “agents” who worked for the Egyptian army, south of Bir al-Abd.
- 9 January - An IED was activated against an Egyptian army bulldozer near the Al-Ahrash camp in western Rafah. The bulldozer was put out of commission. An RPG rocket was launched at an Egyptian army tank near a checkpoint in western Rafah. The tank was put out of commission.
- 12 January - An RPG rocket was launched at an Egyptian army tank near a checkpoint west of Rafah. The tank was put out of commission.
- 15 January - ISIL-SP Militants executed a person they claimed was an "agent" of the Egyptian military in the Sheikh Zuweid area of North Sinai Governorate.
- 25 January - An Egyptian soldier was killed after being targeted by sniper fire near a checkpoint south of Rafah. Acting on intelligence from the attack, Egyptian security forces west of Al-Arish carried out an operation against ISIL-SP operatives who were planning to carry out an attack. The forces killed 12 ISIL-SP forces and wounded several others.

=== February ===
- 2 February - ISIL-SP militants bombed a gas pipeline east of the city of Bir al-Abd, near the village of Amouriya, with flames rising high above the site.
- 5 February - Five Egyptian conscripts were shot dead after ISIL-SP militants stopped their taxi in central Sinai.
- 9 February - Seven soldiers were killed and another seven injured in attacks by ISIL-SP on three army checkpoints in North Sinai.

=== March ===
- 15 March - One Egyptian policeman was killed in a terrorist attack in Al-Arish, North Sinai during an attempt to kill a security officer.

=== April ===
- 7 April - Seven people, including three civilians, were killed and 26 civilians were injured in a suicide bombing near a marketplace in the North Sinai city of Sheikh Zuwayed.
- 30 April - Egypt took 10 casualties in a blast by ISIL-SP targeting an armoured vehicle in the northern Sinai.

=== May ===
- 2 May - 18 suspected armed group members were killed in North Sinai in a firefight with security forces.
- 22 May - Egypt killed 21 suspected terrorists when police stormed two hideouts in the northern Sinai.
- 30 May - The Egyptian military killed at least 19 fighters during security operations in the northern part of the Sinai Peninsula, which also resulted in five casualties among troops.

=== July ===
- 4 July - ISIL-SP militants approached the home of Shaaban al-Ergani, who is union head Ibrahim al-Ergani’s brother. In the ensuing clashes with tribal fighters, one member of Ergani’s security detail was killed and two others were injured.
- 6 July - A group of ISIL-SP militants attacked the village of Abou Tawila and killed three government-aligned Union of Sinai Tribes fighters and injured two others. One of the ISIL militants were killed.
- 21 July - ISIL-SP occupied the villages of Aqtia, Al-Jenain, Rabi’a, Qatia, Iqtiya, Ganayen, Merih, and Al-Marih. They also attacked an Egyptian military camp in the village of Rabea and killed one civilian and claim to kill 40 troops. And claim to wounded 60 troops and three civilians. Egypt pursued the militants to a nearby farm and several deserted houses, killing 18 of them. Two soldiers were also killed in the attack. The militants set up checkpoints at the entrance to Qatiya and killed a non-commissioned military officer.

=== August ===
- 26 August - The Egyptian army retook the villages of Aqtia, al-Jenain, and Rabi’a from ISIL-SP.
- 28 August - The Egyptian army retook the villages of Al-Marih and Qatia from ISIL-SP killing 73 ISIL militants from the 26 to 28 August.

=== September ===
- 23 September - Armed operatives ambushed an Egyptian army force near Jabal Halal, in northern Sinai. Two soldiers were killed and five others were wounded.
- 26 September - An Egyptian army officer and soldier were killed in the explosion of an IED on the Al-Arish highway.

=== October ===
- 11 October - Two women were killed and a man was wounded when an IED went off in their house after just having returning to it after fleeing the village of Qatia on 21 July. A woman and her daughter were also killed by an IED in the village of Al-Janain. Finally three women and a two-year-old were killed when an IED went off in their car.
- 14 October - Lieutenant colonel Mohammad Salah Riad was killed and four of his wounded when an IED went off against them. An IED activated in the village of Al-Marh left one dead and two others were wounded.
- 30 October - ISIL-SP killed a man in Sheikh Zuweid for alleged collaboration with the army.

=== November ===
- 1 November - An IED damaged an Egyptian army mine sweeping vehicle near a roadblock southwest of Sheikh Zuweid.
- 2 November - An IED destroyed an Egyptian army bulldozer near a roadblock east of Sheikh Zuweid.
- 3 November - An army vehicle was attacked in the area of Rafah killing 2 soldiers.
- 4 November - The Egyptian army took an unknown number of casualties when an Egyptian army bulldozer hit an IED south of Sheikh Zuweid.
- 7 November - The passengers of an Egyptian army armored vehicle were killed when an IED was activated against it in the village of Aqtia.
- 8 November - Three unknown armed men abducted a civilian in the city of Bir al-Abd.
- 9 November - Several soldiers were killed or wounded when an IED was activated against an Egyptian army armored vehicle near the village of Aqtia.
- 13 November - Three RPG rockets accurately hit an Egyptian army roadblock near the village of Fallujah.
- 13 November - An ISIL-SP sniper killed an Egyptian soldier at a roadblock west of Rafah.
- 14 November - One Egyptian soldier was killed and others were wounded after taking machine gun fire south of Rafah.
- 15 November - An army observation tower's thermal camera was destroyed, after taking sniper fire at a roadblock near Sheikh Zuweid beach.

== 2021 ==
- 1 January - A roadside bomb killed two members of Egypt's security forces and wounded five others near Bir al-Abd in the northern Sinai Peninsula.
- 9 February - ISIL-SP fighters ambushed tribal militias in central Sinai killing six and abducting one.
- 22 February - ISIS operatives fired at an Egyptian army patrol south of Sheikh Zuweid, near a roadblock. One soldier was killed and two others were wounded.
- 27 February - IS operatives exploded an IED targeting an Egyptian foot patrol. The explosion killed 3 Egyptian soldiers including a colonel, Ahmad Abdel Mohsen. One other soldier was also wounded.
- 11 March — IS claimed responsibility for killing a father and his son who they said were 'collaborating' with Egyptian authorities.
- 22 March — Egyptian and Bedouin forces kill ISIS-SP leader, Salim Salma Said Mahmoud al-Hamadin, during clashes near Al-Barth, south of Rafah.

== 2022 ==
- 7 May - ISIS attacked a water lifting station on the bank of the Suez canal resulting in at least 11 deaths among Egyptian security forces.
