= September 2012 southern Israel cross-border attack =

2012 attack of Israeli soldiers by Egyptian jihadist militants on the Israel-Egypt border

- Part of Sinai insurgency
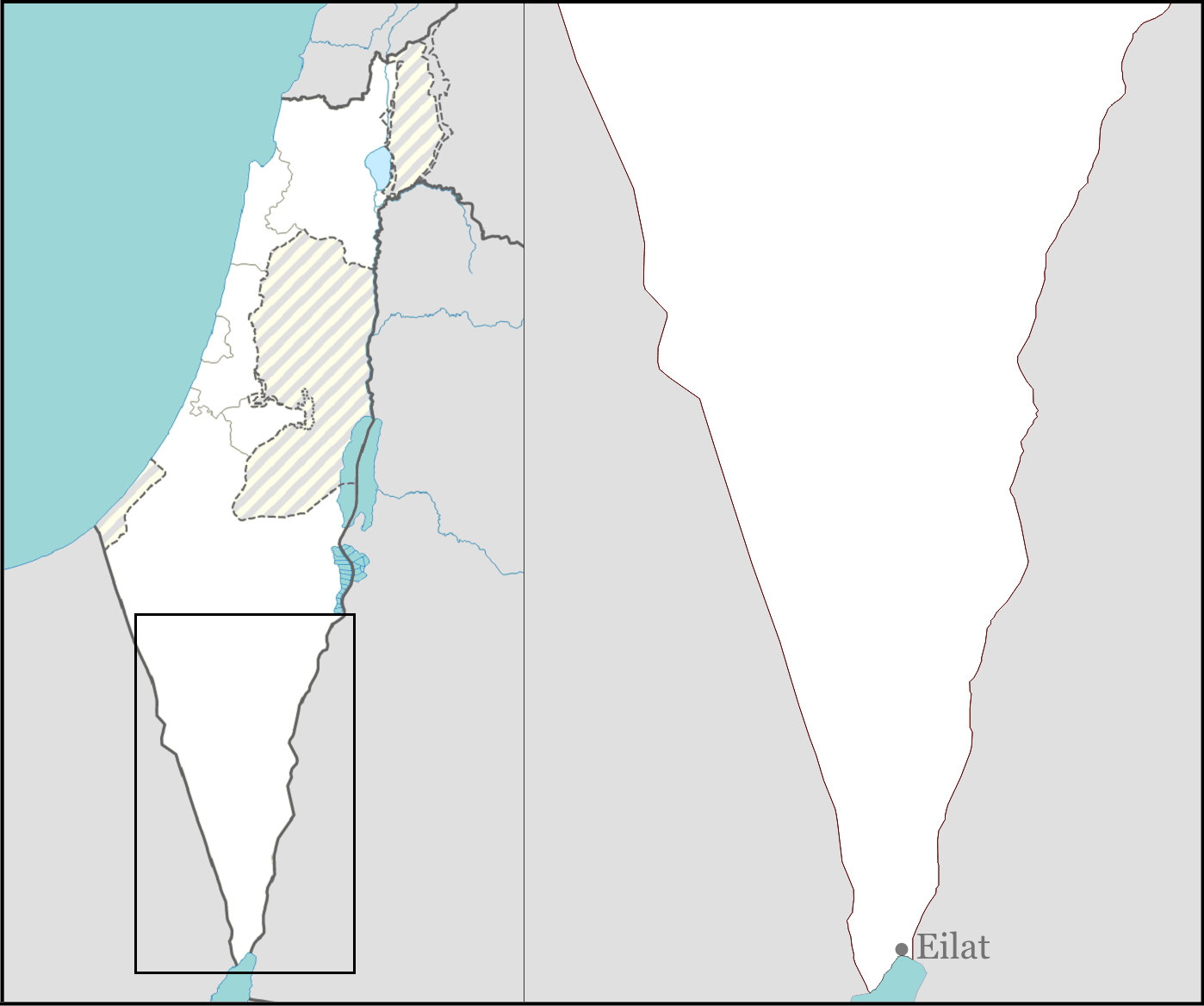
- The attack site
- Location: 30°29′40″N 34°33′27″E; Southern Israel near Mount Harif
- Date: 21 September 2012; 14 years ago
- Attack type: Spree shooting
- Weapons: RPG launchers, two explosive belts, grenades and AK-47 rifles
- Deaths: 1 Israeli soldier, 3 Ansar Bait al-Maqdis militants
- Injuries: 1 Israeli soldier
- Perpetrator: Militants from Ansar Bait al-Maqdis
- Motive: Response to the film Innocence of Muslims and to "discipline the Jews for their heinous acts."

September 2012 southern Israel cross-border attack refers to an incident on 21 September 2012, when three Egyptian militants, wearing civilian clothes and armed with explosive belts, AK-47 rifles and RPG launchers, approached the Egypt-Israel border in an area where the Egypt–Israel barrier was incomplete, and opened fire on a group of IDF soldiers supervising the civilian workers who were constructing the border fence.

The militants opened fire on a small group of IDF soldiers, shooting from a distance of about 100 meters. During the incident, which was thwarted at a relatively early stage by the IDF forces, one Israeli soldier was killed and another moderately wounded. Both of the soldiers were graduates of Hesder yeshivas. The three militants were killed in the ensuing gunfight; one was killed by a female soldier from the mixed-gender Caracal Battalion.

The jihadist militant group Ansar Bait al-Maqdis, an al-Qaeda-inspired militant organization based in the Sinai Peninsula, claimed responsibility for the attack.

The border attack was the fourth cross-border incident of its kind to be carried out in a period of approximately one year, despite Egypt's attempt to eradicate militant activity in the Sinai Peninsula.

== Background ==
Following the Egyptian Revolution of 2011, various militancy organizations increased their activity in the Sinai Peninsula, as well as some al-Qaeda-linked cells who were established as a result in the Sinai Peninsula. These militancy cells have repeatedly attacked and bombed gas pipelines in the Sinai running between Egypt and Israel. As of July 2012, 15 such attacks were perpetrated on these gas pipelines since the 2011 uprising.

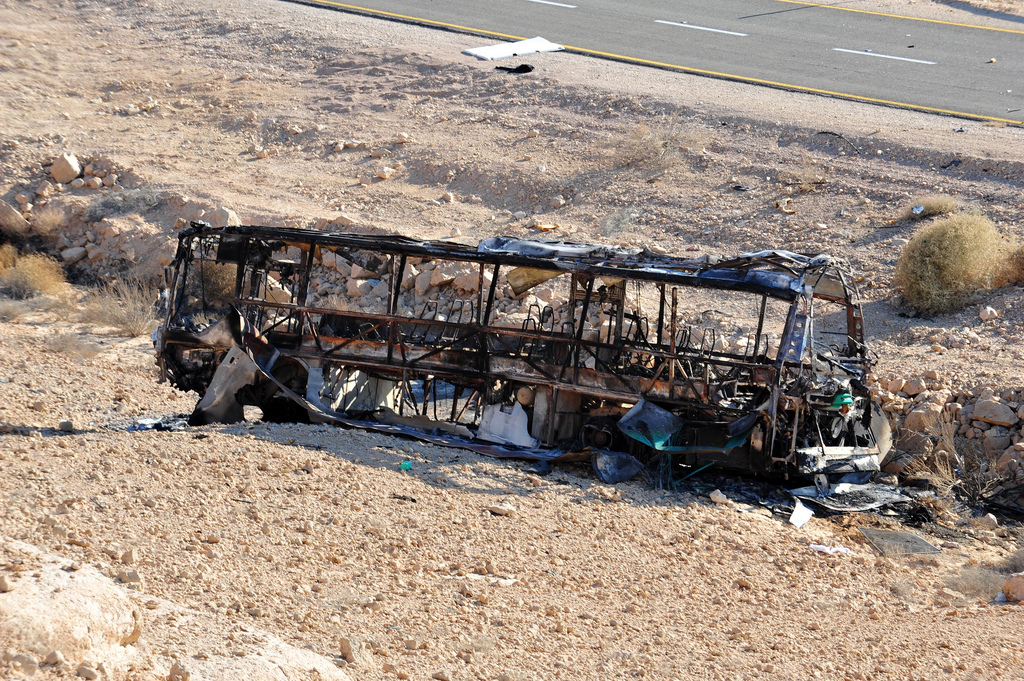
The charred remains of an Egged bus destroyed by a suicide bomber during the August 2011 attacks

In August 2011, a series of cross-border attacks were carried out in southern Israel on Highway 12 near the Egyptian border via the Sinai Peninsula. During the attacks the militants opened fire on an Egged No. 392 bus, at a location north of the city of Eilat, and a short time later, an explosive device was detonated next to an Israeli army patrol driving along the Egypt–Israel border. A third attack occurred when an anti-tank missile was shot at a private vehicle, killing four Israeli civilians. Overall, during this multi-pronged cross-border attacks eight Israelis were killed — among them 6 civilians, one Yamam Special Unit police officer and one IDF soldier. forces reported that the incident ended when the eight attackers were killed, and also the Egyptian security forces reported that they killed two other terrorists. The Israeli security forces reported that eight militants were killed in the event, and the Egyptian security forces reported killing another two militants.

On 31 July 2012, the U.S. Department of State's Office of the Coordinator for Counterterrorism published a report which warned that "The smuggling of humans, weapons, cash, and other contraband through the Sinai into Israel and Gaza created criminal networks with possible ties to terrorist groups in the region. The smuggling of weapons from Libya through Egypt has increased since the overthrow of the Qaddafi regime." In addition, Haaretz reported that militancy forces from al-Qaeda have been stationed in the Sinai and are supported by the local Bedouins. It has also been reported that several other militancy groups in the Gaza Strip have been assisting these forces, and were also smuggling weapons and goods into the Gaza Strip.

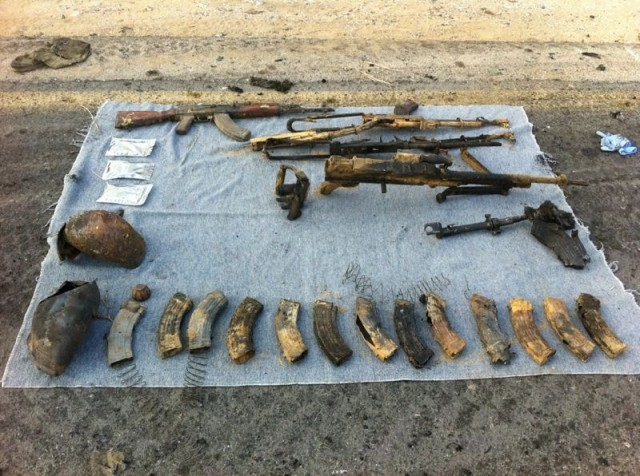
Weapons that were used during the attack in August 2012

On 5 August 2012, a deadly attack was carried out in which militants ambushed an Egyptian military base in the Sinai Peninsula, killed 16 Egyptian soldiers and stole 2 Egyptian armored cars. Afterwards the militants managed to infiltrate into Israel using the stolen armored cars. The attackers broke through the Kerem Shalom border crossing to Israel, where one of the vehicles exploded. Eventually, during the exchange of fire with the IDF forces six militants were killed. There were no wounded or casualties on the Israeli side in this attack attempt.

A few days prior to the attack which was carried out on 21 September, Egyptian security declared a state of alert in the Sinai Peninsula, following intelligence regarding "unprecedented attacks" being launched in the Sinai by jihadist groups against security officers. As a result, the Egyptian army sent eight armored tanks to north Sinai.

== The attack ==
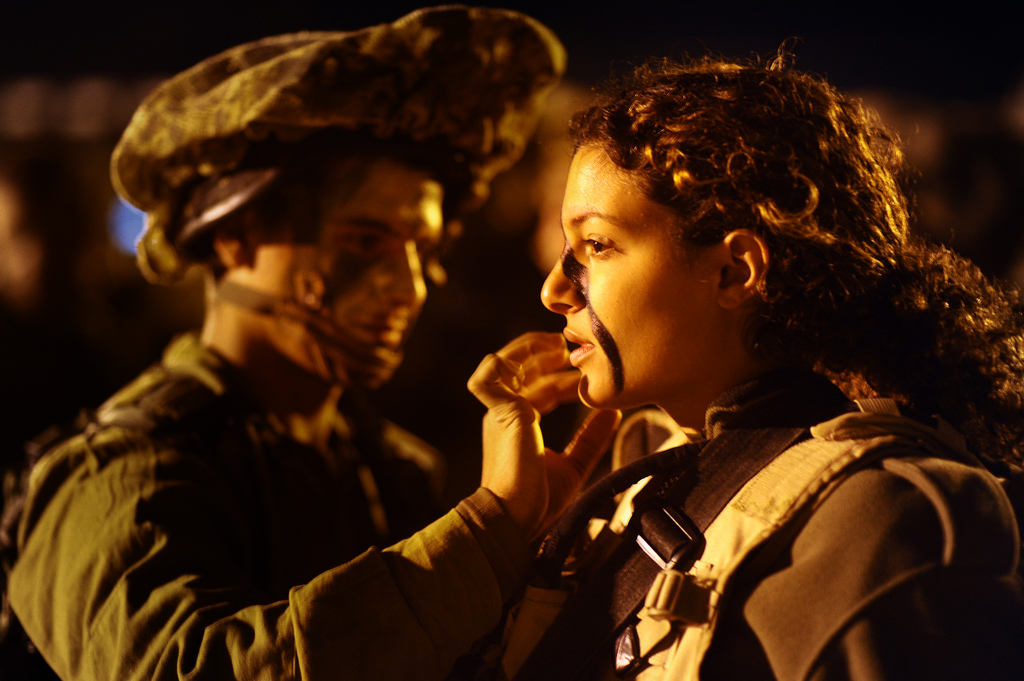
Members of the Caracal Battalion in the Israel Defense Forces

On 21 September 2012, three heavily armed Egyptian militants, who were dressed in civilian clothes, armed with two explosive belts, and carrying rifles and 3 RPG launchers, approached the Egypt-Israel border near Mount Harif, at an area where the Egypt–Israel barrier remained incomplete.

At the time of the attack, Israel had completed the construction of about 200 kilometers from the fence, while only 40 kilometers were remaining — including the area of Mount Harif — a project which the IDF estimated to complete during 2013.

The militants opened fire on a group of IDF soldiers from the Artillery Corps, who were safeguarding civilian workers who were constructing the border fence. The militants began the attack when they opened fire at a small group of IDF soldiers, shooting at them from approximately hundred meters, as they were giving water to a group of 10 illegal immigrants from Africa who were crossing the border as well.

Members of the Caracal Battalion rushed to the scene of the attack and engaged in a firefight with the militants. During the exchange of fire, the explosive belt on one of the militants detonated. Eventually the IDF forces at the site managed to kill the remaining two militants. One of the militants was killed by a female combat soldier from the Caracal Battalion.

During the incident one Israeli soldier was killed by the militants and another was moderately injured. 20-year-old Corporal Netanel Yahalomi of Nof Ayalon, was shot in the head and killed by the militants while he was giving water to African migrants, who attempted to illegally cross the border into Israel. Another soldier was injured from shrapnel resulting from the detonation of the explosive device. The two IDF soldiers were evacuated to the Soroka Medical Center in Beersheba, nevertheless, Yahalomi died shortly after arriving at the hospital.

Following the attack, special forces of the IDF arrived at the site of the attack to investigate the possibility of additional infiltration by militants into Israel, and ruled out this possibility.

== The perpetrators ==
Two days after the attack, the jihadist militant group Ansar Beit al-Maqdes ("Partisans of Jerusalem"), also known as Ansar Jerusalem, an al-Qaeda inspired militant organization based in the Sinai Peninsula, claimed responsibility for the attack.

The group stated that the attack was a "disciplinary attack against those who insulted the beloved Prophet," (referring to the controversial film Innocence of Muslims which was produced in the United States and denigrated the Islamic prophet Mohammed) and to "discipline the Jews for their heinous acts" alleging that Jews were involved in the creation of the film, even though they did not elaborate on how, and although the actual producer of the film was a 55-year-old Coptic Christian from Egypt living in the U.S.

The group also claimed that the three militants who carried the attack actually infiltrated into Israel a day before the attack and remained hidden for about a day until they spotted an Israeli patrol and attacked it.

== Official reactions ==
Involved parties

Israel:

- Israeli Prime Minister Benjamin Netanyahu stated that the incident demonstrated the importance of the Egypt–Israel barrier as it would prevent the infiltration of terrorist cells into Israel. In addition, Netanyahu thanked the Caracal brigade for "preventing an attack that could have been much more deadly".
- IDF Spokesman Brigadier General Yoav Mordechai stated that the IDF thwarted a "very big terrorist attack,". Mordechai also stated that the militants were heavily armed with "AK-47s, grenades and combat vests" and that they "came to carry out a mass casualty killing spree, but were eliminated in only 15 minutes after they first started shooting". Lieutenant-Colonel Avital Leibovich repeated these comments, saying that "A big terror attack was thwarted."
- Two days after the attack, the IDF Chief of Staff Lieutenant-General Benny Gantz visited the site of the attack, and stated in an interview with the media that the Egypt-Israel border would continue to pose a challenge to Israel, even after the construction of the entire border fence would be completed. Gantz explained that "we have made a great effort over the past two years to seal the border with Egypt and it will be sealed, but even when that happens, the threat won't be eliminated."

== Aftermath ==
On the night of 21 September Israel transferred to Egypt the bodies of three militants who carried out the attacked and who were evidently killed in the exchange of fire with the IDF forces.

In response to the attack, Egyptian security officials declared a maximum security alert along the border between Egypt and Israel. In addition, following the attack the Egyptian army also patrolled the area to search for the militants who were suspected of involvement in this attack.

Hundreds of people attended Netanel Yahalomi's funeral. Yahalomi was buried in the cemetery of Modiin and was posthumously promoted from the rank of private to corporal. On 24 September 2012, Israeli President Shimon Peres visited the grieving Yahalomi family to pay his respects. During the meeting, which received broad media coverage, Peres stated that "the pain of your loss is enormous. I came to you, on the eve of Yom Kippur, in order to tell you on behalf of the entire nation how proud we are of your son and that your pain is ours."

Following the attack, it was announced that the IDF would continue to offer aid to African infiltrators and migrants, which includes providing them with food and water.

== See also ==
- Operation Eagle
- Operation Sinai
- Terrorism in Egypt
- 2011 southern Israel cross-border attacks
