= Operation Eagle =

2011 Egyptian military campaign in the Sinai Peninsula against the Sinai Insurgency

- Part of Sinai insurgency
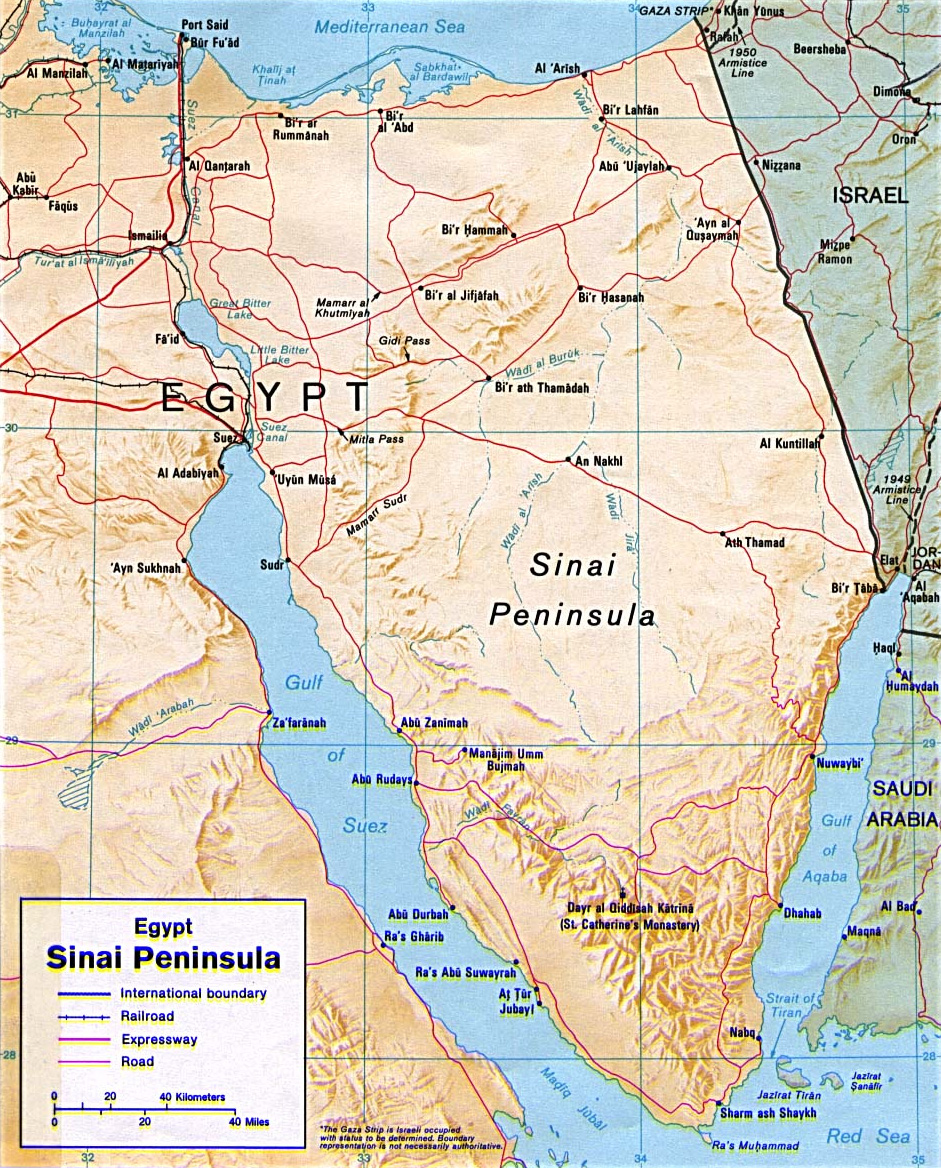
- Map of the Sinai Peninsula
Date	14 August 2011 – September 2012
Location	Sinai Peninsula, Egypt
Result	Egyptian government victory

Belligerents
Egypt; Egyptian Armed Forces; Egyptian Army; Central Security Forces; Egyptian National Police	Islamists: Ansar Bait al-Maqdis (until late 2014); Bedouin tribesmen; Jund al Islam; Popular Resistance Movement; Takfir wal-Hijra; Tawhid al-Jihad; Ansar al-Sharia (from 2012); Mujahideen Shura Council (from 2012); Army of Islam; Abdullah Azzam Brigades; Al-Qaeda in Sinai Peninsula (from late 2011); Al Furqan Brigades; Soldiers of Egypt (from 2013)

Commanders and leaders
(Egypt) Sami Anan (Egypt) M. H. Tantawi	Unknown

Units involved
Second Army; Third Army	Insurgent Cells

Operation Eagle (Arabic: عملية نسر) was an Egyptian military campaign in the Sinai Peninsula, that was launched in August 2011 to confront the Sinai insurgency. The campaign was aimed against Islamist insurgents, who had been attacking the Egyptian security forces in the Sinai and using the area as a base from which to attack Israel since early 2011. Successive Egyptian operation against insurgents in 2012, named Operation Sinai, was initially referred to as the second part of Operation Eagle. It was the first in a number of campaigns to retake the Sinai from insurgents which was achieved.

== Background ==
=== Historic perspective ===
Sinai was an integral part of Egypt since the inception of the Muhammad Ali dynasty in the early 19th century. Israel briefly captured the Sinai Peninsula from Egypt in the 1967 Six-Day War. As part of the 1979 Egypt–Israel peace treaty, in 1982 Israel withdrew from the peninsula. Among the treaty's other provisions was an agreement that the peninsula would be left effectively demilitarized.

A number of factors have enabled armed Islamist groups to take root and proliferate in the Sinai. Including local population susceptibility to Propaganda and smuggling to Gaza.

=== Early Islamist attacks ===
The security situation in the Sinai began deteriorating early in 2011, as a fallout of the 2011 Egyptian revolution. Since February to August of that year, the Egypt–Israel pipeline in El-Arish was attacked five times by saboteurs.

On 30 July, militants staged an attack on an Egyptian police station in El-Arish, killing six.

On 2 August, a group claiming to be the Sinai wing of Al-Qaeda declared its intention to create an Islamic caliphate in the Sinai.

== Operation ==
After working out arrangement with the Israeli government to permit more forces in the Sinai Peninsula than is allowed for by the security annex of the 1979 Egypt-Israel Peace Treaty. SCAF launched Operation Eagle on 14–15 August 2011.

Egypt deployed 2,500 troops and 250 armored personnel carriers including two special forces brigades, tanks and Apache helicopters, in key locations in North Sinai, with armored personnel carriers operating around al Arish, Rafah and Shaykh Zuweid. The move marked the first time Egypt has deployed military forces on such a scale since its treaty with Israel. The objectives of the operation are to confront Islamist insurgents and criminal gangs threatening Egypt's national security and to restore law and order.

External image
- "A convoy of Egyptian armoured vehicles head along a road on the Sinai Peninsula near the Gaza border on August 13, 2011"—CNN

On 15 August, Egyptian security forces swept through a house known to be used by five leading Islamist figures. One of the five was killed; the remaining four were taken into custody.

On 16 August, a group of gunmen believed to be affiliated with jihadist movements attacked an Egyptian army checkpoint. Egypt's forces suffered no casualties in the assault.

On 17 August, two Bedouins were killed in southern Sinai. Their families blamed Egyptian police for their deaths, but the police said it was not involved in the incident.

On 18 August, a coordinated attack was staged upon Israeli military and civilians from Sinai, resulting in 6 Israeli civilians and two soldiers and 5 Egyptian soldiers killed, as well as 10 attackers.

On 26 August, then Israeli defense minister Ehud Barak said that Israel will agree for Egypt to employ thousands of troops in the Sinai.

== Aftermath ==
Following the 2012 Egyptian-Israeli border attack, forces from Egypt's army and the police engaged in an operation against armed men who have been targeting security personnel in North Sinai. A number of clashes between armed men and security forces at several security checkpoints in the Sinai occurred during this time. Initially, the press related to the 2012 operation as the continuation of Operation Eagle, though later turning to an Egyptian official name Operation Sinai (2012).

Egyptian security sources have said that over 2,000 Islamic militants reside in the Sinai region. The military said that the goal of the operation is to "restore security by pursuing and targeting armed terrorist elements in Sinai."

== Reactions ==
=== Israel ===
The 1979 Camp David Accords, which established peace between Egypt and Israel, mandates that the Sinai must remain demilitarized.

During the beginning of the operation in 2011, Israel allowed the deployment of thousands of troops in the Sinai, with helicopters and armored vehicles, but not tanks.

During the beginning of August 2012, when Operation Eagle intensified, Israel approved a request from Barak to allow Egypt to deploy attack helicopters in the Sinai.

However, concern began to be raised as Egypt began deploying more force and tanks without coordination from Israel. On 21 August, Israeli foreign minister Avigdor Lieberman said that it is important for Israel to make sure that the Egyptian-Israeli peace treaty is upheld, and not to remain silent as Egyptian military forces enter the Sinai. Concern was raised by Israeli officials over Egyptian failure to notify Israel about the deployment of tanks in the Sinai, which violates the peace treaty. Lieberman said, "We must make sure that every detail is upheld, otherwise we'll find ourselves in a slippery slope as far as the peace treaty is concerned."

On the same day, Israeli daily Maariv reported that Israel sent a message to Egypt via the White House, protesting Egypt's ongoing increase in military presence in the Sinai without coordination from Israel, and telling Egypt that it must remove tanks from the Sinai because their presence violates the Egyptian-Israeli peace treaty of 1979, which states that Sinai Peninsula is to remain demilitarized. The Israeli daily Maariv reported was reinforced by an article in The New York Times, which stated that Israel was "troubled" by the entry of Egyptian tanks into the northern Sinai Peninsula without coordination with Israel and had asked Egypt to withdraw them. Partly due to Egypt's military deploying tanks in the Sinai Peninsula, Israel is increasingly worried about what has long been their most critical regional relationship. The lack of coordination around their deployment is seen as potentially undermining a peace treaty that has been a cornerstone of Israel's security for decades, according to The New York Times. Israel is also concerned that Egypt may use Operation Eagle to build up its military presence in the Sinai, and leave the tanks and armored carriers in the Sinai while not doing much more than symbolic action to eliminate the terrorist threat.

Israel has not issued a formal complaint, and instead prefers to resolve the issue through quiet contacts, as well as mediation from the U.S., to avoid straining its relationship with Egypt.

On 24 August 2012, a senior Egyptian military source said that Egyptian Defense Minister Abdel Fattah el-Sissi and Israeli Defense Minister Ehud Barak have reached an agreement on the issue of the militarization of the Sinai. Al Hayat reported that Sissi phoned Barak and said that Egypt was committed to maintaining the peace treaty with Israel. Sissi also said that the militarization was temporary, and is needed for security and to fight terrorism. However, an Israeli defense official denied that such a conversation took place.

In late August 2012, then Egyptian president Mohamed Morsi said that the security operations do not threaten anyone, and "there should not be any kind of international or regional concerns at all from the presence of Egyptian security forces". Morsi added that the campaign was in "full respect to international treaties". The Egyptian-Israeli peace deal places limits on Egyptian military deployment in the Sinai. Officials in Israel were concerned about Egypt building up heavy armour in Sinai.

On 8 September, an Israeli official confirmed that coordination exists between Israel and Egypt regarding Operation Eagle. Egyptian Military spokesman Ahmed Mohammed Ali had earlier announced that Egypt has been consulting with Israel regarding its security measures in the Sinai.

=== United States ===
According to CNN, in a move to increase security in the Sinai, help Morsi, and reassure Israel, U.S. Defense Secretary Leon Panetta offered Egypt classified intelligence-sharing capabilities to help Egypt identify military threats in the area, which he discussed during his recent trips to Egypt and Israel. The technology has been widely used in Iraq and Afghanistan to identify vehicles at great distances. The technology may also be used by the Multinational Force and Observers in Sinai. The United States is also offering increased intelligence sharing, including satellite imagery and drone flights, as well as cellphone intercepts and other communications among militants suspected of plotting attacks.

On 22 August, the State Department urged Egypt to be transparent over Operation Eagle and any security operations in the Sinai. The State Department said that the United States supports Operation Eagle against terrorism, but stressed that Egypt must continue coordination with Israel regarding these operations and military increases in the Sinai, according to the 1979 Camp David Accords. The State Department also called on Egypt to fulfill its obligations under the 1979 Egyptian-Israeli peace treaty and deal strongly with security threats in the Sinai, while ensuring that "lines of communication stay open."

On 23 August, then Secretary of State Hillary Clinton, speaking with Egyptian foreign minister Mohamed Kamel Amr, urged Amr to maintain lines of communication with Israel, and emphasized the importance of being transparent over the militarization of the Sinai.

=== Multinational Force and Observers in Sinai ===
The Multinational Force and Observers in Sinai, a 1650-strong international organization created in 1979 during the Camp David Accords with peacekeeping responsibilities, kept a low profile during the intensification of Operation Eagle in 2012. A representative for the organization said that "we are unable to respond to queries from the media at this time" in response to whether Egypt asked permission to move weaponry into the Sinai, and whether Israel granted it.

== See also ==
- Arab Spring
