= Debka =

Debka may refer to:

- Dabke, a traditional folk dance of the Middle East
- DEBKAfile, a former Israeli security website
