= Operation Sinai (2012) =

Egyptian military campaign against the Sinai Insurgency (2012-present)

- Part of the Sinai insurgency
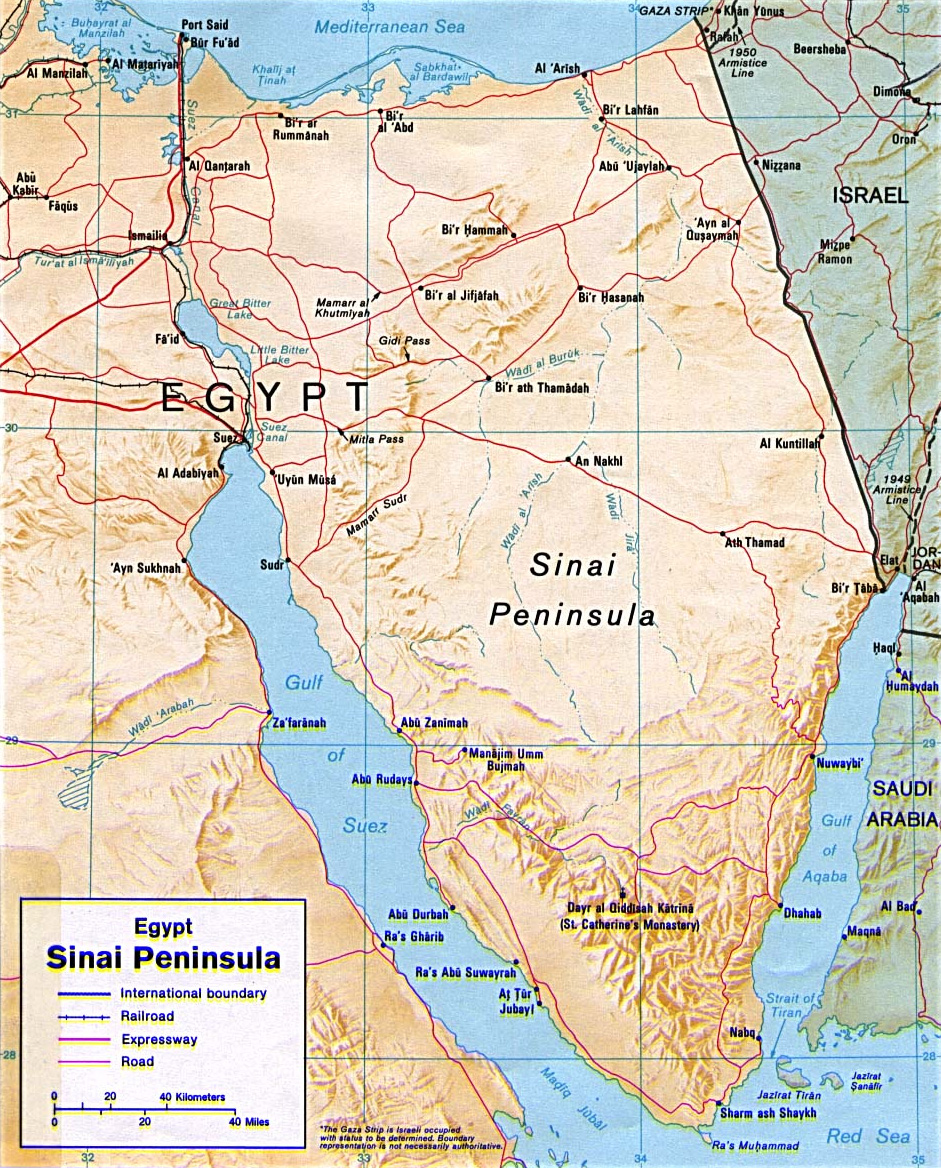
- Map of the Sinai Peninsula
| Date | 7 August 2012 – 25 January 2023 |
| Location | Sinai Peninsula, Egypt |
| Status | Egyptian victory |

Belligerents
| Egypt: Egyptian Armed Forces; Central Security Forces; Egyptian National Police | Islamists: Ansar Bait al-Maqdis (until late 2014); Bedouin tribesmen; Jund al Islam; Popular Resistance Movement; Takfir wal-Hijra; Tawhid al-Jihad; Ansar al-Sharia (from 2012); Mujahideen Shura Council (from 2012); Army of Islam; Abdullah Azzam Brigades; Al-Qaeda in Sinai Peninsula (from late 2011); Al Furqan Brigades; Soldiers of Egypt (from 2013); Islamic State (from 2014): Wilayat Sinai |

Commanders and leaders
| (Egypt) Abdel Fattah el-Sisi (2014–present) (Egypt) Adly Mansour (2012–16) (Egypt) Mahmoud Tawfik (2018–present) (Egypt) Magdy Abdel Ghaffar (2015–18) (Egypt) Mohamed Ibrahim Moustafa (2013–15) (Egypt) Ahmed Gamal El Din (2012–13) (Egypt) Mohamed Ahmed Zaki (2018–present) (Egypt) Sedki Sobhi (2014–18) | |

Casualties and losses
| 21 killed, 36 wounded | 32 killed, 38 arrested |
- 2 civilians killed, 6 wounded. Total: 55 killed

Operation Sinai was an Egyptian military campaign, launched in early August 2012, against Islamic militants within the Sinai Peninsula to crush the Sinai Insurgency. The operation came as a direct response to the 2012 Egyptian-Israeli border attack on 5 August 2012. The operation was initially reported as part of "Operation Nisr" (Operation Eagle), but on 3 September 2012, the Egyptian army issued a statement requesting media sources to use the official name "Operation Sinai."

== Background ==
The Egyptian Armed Forces were engaged in a sustained military campaign to subdue and eliminate Islamic militants, viewed as a threat to national and regional security, from the Northern Sinai Peninsula. Over the last two years, extremists in the Northern Sinai region have attacked civilians and Egyptian authorities, resulting in military and police deaths, and countless other injuries.

The Sinai insurgency began in February 2011, during the events of the 2011 Egyptian Revolution. As a result of destabilization of the Egyptian government, various insurgent groups, including mostly Bedouins, began to undermine central authority of Egypt. As a result, Egyptian interim government poured troops into the Sinai peninsula on 15 August 2011, in what became known as Operation Eagle.

During the Mohamed Morsi's presidency, attempted to relaxed restrictions and conduct a "political dialogue" with salafi jihadist groups. Despite these efforts, however, fighting in the Sinai continued. The 2012 Egyptian–Israeli border attack, which led to Operation Sinai, occurred on 5 August 2012, when armed men ambushed an Egyptian military base in the Sinai Peninsula, killing 16 soldiers and stealing two armored cars, which they used to infiltrate into Israel. The attackers broke through the Kerem Shalom border crossing into Israel, where one of the vehicles exploded. They then engaged in firefight with soldiers of the Israel Defense Forces, during which six of the attackers were killed. Egyptian President Mohamed Morsi vowed to retake the Sinai Peninsula and declared three days of mourning.

== August 2012 ==
A few days after the 2012 Egyptian-Israeli border attack, forces from Egypt's army and the police engaged in an operation against armed men who have been targeting security personnel in North Sinai. A number of clashes between armed men and security forces at several security checkpoints in the Sinai occurred during this time. In one attack, gunmen opened fire on three local security checkpoints, wounding at least six people, and triggering protests in the region by Egyptians, who demanded protection.

At 3:20 A.M., on 8 August, following attacks on several of these security checkpoints, Egyptian military troops and jets killed 20 militants, wounded a few dozen people, and destroyed three armored cars belongs to the militants in the village of al-Toumah in the Sinai Peninsula. This was the first time since 1973 that Egypt launched an air strike in the Sinai. A commander said that the army had received information that many fighters were in the village. Separate attacks by the military were also carried out just outside Sheikh Zuwayed.

Egyptian security sources said that over 2,000 Islamic militants reside in the Sinai region, and the Egyptian media are referring to the operation as "Sinai cleansing operation." The military said that the goal of the operation is to "restore security by pursuing and targeting armed terrorist elements in Sinai." Security sources in Sheikh Zuwayed, a city in the Sinai, reported that the Egyptian army has been raiding hundreds of houses in the region in the hopes of tracing terrorists and confiscating weapons. Later in the day, Egypt's military said that its operation against fighters in the Sinai Peninsula was "a complete success and will continue."

On 9 August, Israel's security cabinet approved a request from Israeli Defense Minister Ehud Barak to allow Egypt to deploy attack helicopters in the Sinai Peninsula for its recent operations. This approval was necessary under the Camp David Accords, which limit the type of weaponry that are allowed in the Sinai.

On 10 August, the police and military arrested nine suspects (of the 5 August attack) in the village of Sheikh Zuwayed, in North Sinai, as part of the ongoing operation. A military source called the arrested suspects "terrorist elements" and another high-level military source said that the suspects belong to radical groups. One of those arrested was nicknamed by Egypt as "Bin Laden of Sinai" and is suspected of being responsible for planning and executing the 5 August attack. Another accomplice possessed 22 Egyptian citizens’ ID cards. The arrested were charged with attacking police officers and stations in the Sinai Peninsula, belonging to a jihadi group, and smuggling weapons to and from the Gaza Strip.

On 10 August, NPR's Leila Fadel said that she could not find any evidence of the new Egyptian military campaign, when she went to villages where the fighting was said to have been the most intense, which has raised the possibility that Egypt has been inflating the facts on their military campaign.

As of 11 August, Egypt sent hundreds of troops and armored vehicles into North Sinai to combat terrorists operating near the Egyptian-Israeli border. Al Ahram reported that security forces have intensified their presence in a number of villages in North Sinai where wanted suspects are believed to be hiding. One of these villages, the Mahdeya village, is considered to be the largest arms trade center in North Sinai, and security forces aim to eliminiate similar spots because they provide sophisticated weapons to radical groups. On the same day, a group of armed men opened fire on peacekeeping troops in the Um Shyhan area in the Sinai on the border with Israel. No one was injured.

On 12 August, Egyptian security forces killed seven suspected militants during raids on hideouts in two villages near El-Arish of al-Ghora and al-Mahdiyah in northern Sinai. The security officials seized landmines, an anti-aircraft missile, heavy machine-guns and grenades. The militants were killed when the security forces shelled a house in which they took cover after exchanging fire.

On 13 August, the sixth day of the military crackdown on Islamists, armed men shot dead tribal leader Khalaf Al-Menahy and his son, as they came back from a conference organized by tribal leaders to denounce militancy. In addition, a source close to Islamists in the Sinai said that hundreds of them had organized a secret meeting to discuss their response to the killing of five suspected terrorists by Egyptian soldiers earlier in the day, and agreed that the reaction will be harsh.

On 17 August, an arrested suspect guided security forces to an apartment in Sheikh Zuwayed that was used by terrorists to hide "wireless devices and jihadist books." The apartment also contained three black flags that read. "There is no god but God and Mohamed is the messenger of God."

On 20 August, Defense Minister General Abdel Fattah al-Sisi made his first visit to the Sinai since the 5 August attack, and finalized plans to intensify the crackdown. These plans included using aircraft and tanks in the Sinai for the first time since the 1973 Yom Kippur War.

== September 2012 ==
On 7 September 2012, gunmen attacked the Egyptian Rayesa checkpoint, located outside of Arish in the Sinai. This marked the 34th attack on the checkpoint since the Egyptian Revolution of 2011. Egyptian soldiers searched the surrounding area and inspected passing cars to question their passengers.

On 8 September 2012, Egyptian military spokesman Ahmed Mohammed Ali announced that Egyptian soldiers have killed 32 "criminal elements," arrested 38 people, and destroyed 31 smuggling tunnels along the Egyptian-Gaza border as part of Operation Sinai, following the 2012 Egyptian-Israeli border attack. In addition, Ali said that Egypt was consulting Israel regarding Egyptian security measures in the Sinai, which an Israeli government official confirmed.

Israeli soldiers, who were providing security to construction crews building a fence in the Har Harif area on the border with the Egyptian Sinai, were attacked. One Israeli soldier was killed and another was wounded during the attack, while three gunmen executing the attack were killed by the Israeli military. A group calling itself Ansar Jerusalem ("Supporters of Jerusalem") claimed responsibility for the deadly attack along the Egyptian-Israeli border.

== October 2012 ==
By October 2012, a large amount of Egyptian forces had been withdrawn from Sinai.

On 8 October 2012, there was an alleged attack on Egyptian Central Security Forces with 21 people dying in a truck crash. The attack was initially referred to as an accident. However, sources have stated that gunmen shot at the vehicles' tires, causing it to lose control and crash. A more recent statement by the police has placed the blame of the crash on driver error.

== Egyptian Armed Forces' strategy and operations ==
Egyptian security forces launched Operation Sinai (Op-Sinai) to reassert effective control of the area by subduing and eliminating violent extremists. The campaign is a comprehensive and sustained effort involving air, land, special forces, and intelligence units of the Egyptian military.

The key military objectives of the Egyptian military's Sinai operations include:

- Protect the Suez Canal.
- Eliminate violent extremists.
- Enhance border security and prevent smuggling.
- Protect Egyptian citizens and enable a better quality of life.

The Egyptian Armed Forces are carrying out tasks in Sinai according to certain considerations, limitations, and controls:

- The first consideration: The implementation of mission objectives with the highest degree of success and the fewest casualties.
- The second consideration: Limiting the confrontations to armed elements that are threatening security, while maintaining a close dialogue with local people.
- The third consideration: Deploying a diverse array of troops and armament systems to deal with the unique topographic nature of Sinai, which carries a variety of attributes like farmlands, deserts, mountains and residential cities.
- The fourth consideration: Care and respect for the local population and their customs, traditions, and values. Mutual respect and cooperation forms the basis of the close relationship between the Egyptian Armed Forces and people in Sinai. This relationship is considered one of the national action pillars – to achieve national interests without affecting the rights, freedoms, and interests of people in Sinai.
- The fifth consideration: The strict adherence to mission objectives and goals, which will ensures the successful completion of this military operation.
- The sixth consideration: Bringing about security and stability in the Sinai, as part of an integrated plan to revive growth and development in the region, and deal with all the influencing sources on the security in Sinai from different directions.

== Key Facts ==
Units of the Egyptian Second Army, along with Naval and Air Forces, are working closely with local police, government and Bedouin leaders to prevent acts of terrorism in the North Sinai by identifying and eliminating violent extremists in villages. The military has also launched operations to close illegal tunnels that enable smuggling of illicit materials underneath the Egypt-Gaza border. Naval vessels patrol the Suez to ensure safe passage of ships, and prevent terrorist attacks from shore, and Egyptian forces are working to protect critically important gas pipelines and prevent future terrorist attacks on them.

Force Deployment:

- The Op-Sinai mission is being conducted as a joint command, coordinated by the Egyptian Second Field Army. The mission includes other key elements of the Egyptian military, including the Air Force, Navy, Border Guard, and Special Forces.
- The Second Field Army is coordinating its operations with the Governorate of the North Sinai, local Bedouin tribal leaders, the civil police and other local officials. In addition, there is close cooperation with Egyptian Military Intelligence and the National Security Agency.
- Op-Sinai mission forces are stationed in three main cities in the Northern Sinai region: Al-Arish, Al-Sheik Zowayed and Rafah. Checkpoints and regular patrols have been established in these locations to protect citizens and maintain security.
