= Operation Martyr's Right =

- Part of the Sinai insurgency
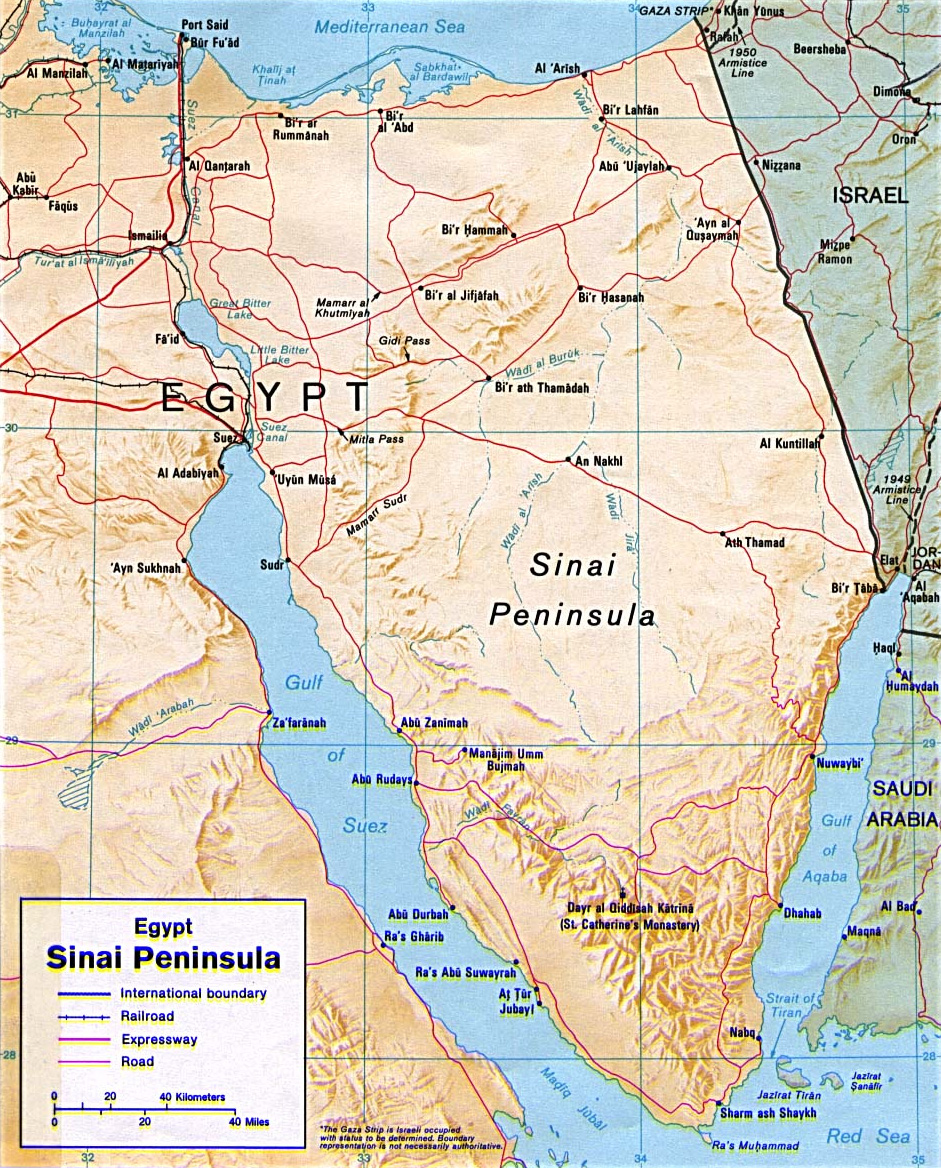
- Map of the Sinai Peninsula.
Date	7 September 2015 – 25 January 2023 (11 years, 2 months and 5 days)
Location	Sinai Peninsula, Egypt
Result	Egyptian government victory

Belligerents
Egypt: Egyptian Armed Forces; Egyptian National Police	Islamic State: Wilayat Sinai

Commanders and leaders
Abdel Fattah el-Sisi (2015–present); Mohamed Ahmed Zaki (2018–present) (Egypt) Sedki Sobhi (2015–18); Mahmoud Tawfik (2018–present); Magdy Abdel Ghaffar (2015–18)	Abu Osama al-Masri † (IS Emir of Wilayat Sinai); Shadi el-Manaei

Casualties and losses
Security forces: 10 soldiers killed 3 humvees destroyed	1,013 militants killed

Operation Martyr's Right (Arabic: عملية حق الشهيد) was a military operation conducted by the Egyptian Armed Forces in cooperation with the Egyptian National Police officers, aimed at rooting out and killing militants of the so-called Islamic State.

The operation was officially launched on 7 September 2015 and was considered to be the largest military action in the Sinai Peninsula in months, targeting sites in all towns of Northern Sinai.

A part of the larger background of an international campaign against the Islamic State, over two hundred militants tied to the terrorist group have been reported dead.

== Background and context ==
According to the official armed forces spokesman, the operation has been launched based on an estimation of the situation and fresh information about many hideouts and targets. The operation came days after the Sinai Province militant group released a video documenting its attacks on the Egyptian military in Sinai, including footage of a wire-guided missile strike that damaged a naval vessel.

== Preparations ==
Eyewitnesses in North Sinai confirmed there had been a buildup for the operation and an increased number of security checkpoints.

These checkpoints were to restrict travelers from visiting the area unless shown proof of residency and barrier walls were set up along the Gaza border as well as the EAF setting up a buffer zone in the area. This action was met in the efforts to disrupt terrorist's logistics and supply lines.

== Strategy and results ==
The Egyptian military deployed naval special forces units in order to patrol the shore line and prevent any attempt for the militants to receive help or escape by sea.

As of 17 September, over five hundred IS fighters are believed to have been killed.

First phase

On 23 September 2015, the Egyptian military spokesman announced the ending of the first phase of the operation, after 16 days, and resulting in the following:

1. The destruction of a vast network of militant-sanctuaries, weapons, ammunition and explosives storage warehouses.
2. Achieve full control over all the roads and the main axes and sub extended ones in the cities of Rafah, Sheikh Zuweid, Al-Arish, and the surrounding villages.
3. The destruction of a large number of armed trucks and motorcycles used by the militants in their operations.
4. The disposal of large amounts of explosives and IEDs.

According to an annual report issued by the U.S. State Department in June 2016, global terrorist activity for 2015 has declined nationwide in the second half of the year because of this.

Second phase

The second stage of the operation began on 6 October 2015, in commemoration of Egypt's victory in the 6 October War. The second phase included development projects and reconstruction of Northern Sinai cities that were damaged by fighting in the first phase of the operation as well as humanitarian aid to civilians in those areas.

Third phase

The third phase began on 21 May 2016, it was carried out by the Second Field Army using air and ground forces that span for four days resulting in killing over 150 terrorists, arresting three others, destroying a number of ammunition stores, and more than 75 hideouts.

Fourth phase

The fourth and last phase of the operation that started on 19 July 2017 and lasted for seven days. The Second Field Army along with Egypt's naval forces carried out this phase in killing 150 terrorists, arresting five others, destroying 25 four-wheel vehicles, fifteen motorbikes, five bomb cars, 52 hideouts, dismantled 173 bombs, and seizing a large amount of ammunition.

== See also ==
- War against the Islamic State
- Timeline of the Sinai insurgency
