= Al-Qaeda in the Sinai Peninsula =

Militant jihadist organization

- القاعدة في شبه جزيرة سيناء
- Shahada flag
- Leaders: Mohammed Eid Muslih Hamad (POW) (Unknown-2011); Ramzi Mowafi (2011-2014)
- Dates active: 5 August 2006 — 10 October 2018
- Groups: Ansar al-Sharia (Egypt); Jamaat al-Murabiteen; Muhammad Jamal Network; Jund al-Islam; Military faction of al-Jama'a al-Islamiyya; Ansar al-Jihad in Sinai Peninsula; Nasr City Cell; Mimbar Sinai
- Headquarters: Rafah and Arish; Nasr City
- Active regions: Sinai Peninsula, Egypt and Libya
- Ideology: see list: Sunni Islamism Pan-Islamism Islamic extremism Islamic fundamentalism Islamic nationalism Qutbism Wahhabism Salafism Salafist jihadism Irredentism Anti-Zionism Antisemitism Anti-Judaism Anti-Christian sentiment Anti-LGBT sentiment Anti-Western sentiment Anti-communism Anti-Imperialism
- Size: Under 40 (2011 Egypt estimate); 7,000-9,000 fighters (2013 estimates by Debkafile) 1,000 (2018 estimate by the Council on Foreign Relations)
- Part of: Al-Qaeda
- Wars: Sinai insurgency, Egyptian crisis (2011–2014), Second Libyan Civil War

Al-Qaeda in the Sinai Peninsula (Arabic: القاعدة في شبه جزيرة سيناء, romanized: al-Qā‘idah fī shibh Jazīrat Sīnāʼ), or AQSP, was an Egyptian militant jihadist organization possibly formed by a merger between al-Qaeda operatives in Sinai and Ansar al Jihad. It was Al-Qaeda's branch in the Sinai Peninsula, and is composed of many Al-Qaeda factions in the area. AQSP made international headlines in November 2014 when the organization pledged allegiance to the Islamic State (IS) in a nine-minute audio speech released on Twitter.

== Origins ==
The Al-Qaeda branch in Egypt was first announced on 5 August 2006, when the deputy leader of Al-Qaeda Ayman al-Zawahiri announced that a faction of Al-Gama'a al-Islamiyya had become Al-Qaeda's branch in Egypt. A leader of Al-Gama'a al-Islamiyya, Muhammad al-Hukaymah, appeared in a video recording and confirming this move. However, al-Hukaymah acknowledged that other members of Al-Gama'a had "reverted" from the militant course he was adhering to, and some Al-Gama'a representatives also denied that they were joining forces with the international Al-Qaeda network. It's unknown when Al-Qaeda began to operate in Sinai, but in August 2011, a group claimed to be the Al-Qaeda wing in Sinai.

In November 2011, Egypt police arrested an Al-Qaeda operative named Mohammed Eid Muslih Hamad, a leader of an organization thought to be the affiliate of Al-Qaeda in Egypt that is responsible for many bombings and assassinations across the years. Also, on 22 December 2011, a new jihadist group that calls itself Ansar al Jihad in the Sinai Peninsula announced its formation, in a statement promising to "fulfill the oath" to the slain Al-Qaeda leader Osama bin Laden. "With this message we send you the good tidings of the birth of the group ‘Ansar al-Jihad in the Sinai Peninsula,’ and we pledge unto Allah the Great and Almighty to do our best to fight the corrupt regime and its henchmen among the Jews, the Americans, and those around them," the statement said. The terror group pledged "to fulfill the oath of the martyr of the Ummah, our Sheikh Osama bin Laden, may Allah have mercy on him." However, it is not certain that Al-Qaeda branches in Egypt, like Ansar al Jihad and Hamad's group, are directly co-operating, although Ansar al Jihad has pledged an oath of allegiance to al-Qaeda.

== Groups Part of AQSP ==
Ansar al-Jihad in the Sinai Peninsula. This organization serves as the military arm of al-Qaeda in Sinai Peninsula. This organization is led by Ramzi Mowafi and has been responsible for multiple attacks on Egyptian and Israeli targets.

Egyptian Islamic Jihad was formed in the 1970s, but later aligned itself with al-Qaeda in June 2011. In 2005, they were designated by the United States State Department as a Foreign Terrorist Organization (FTO).

Jamaat al-Murabiteen (The Sentinels Group, also calling itself just 'al-Murabitun') is a jihadi organization formed in July 2015, led by Abu Omar al-Muhajir, the alias for Hisham Ashmawi, who defected from the Egyptian army's special forces and was once linked to Ansar Bait al-Maqdis, which became the Islamic State's Sinai Province. The group is a part of AQSP, a part of Al-Qaeda, featuring Al-Qaeda leader Ayman al-Zawahiri in its videos. The group's leadership mainly operates in Libya, in Derna and Benghazi.

Muhammad Jamal Network Is led by Muhammad Jamal, a subordinate of al-Zawahiri. The group is part of AQSP, and is designated as a terrorist group by Iraq and the US. Its also has connections with AQIM and AQAP.

Nasr City Cell Nasr city cell, is a part of AQSP, and one of the first Al-Qaeda cells to operate inside the capital of Egypt, Cairo. It was led, again by Mohammed Jamal.

Jund al-Islam Jund al-Islam emerged in September 2013 as a part of AQSP with a claim of a double suicide attack on the Egyptian military intelligence HQ in the north Sinai town of Rafah, on the border with the Gaza Strip. It has stepped up its propaganda campaign in 2015, claiming rocket attacks on Israel, and in its latest video claims to have links with Al-Qaeda in Yemen, which has a record of trying to down planes.

Ansar al-Sharia (Egypt) Ahmed Ashoush, in 2012, claimed to be honored to be a part of al-Qaeda. Thus, he claimed that his group is part of a broader Qaeda network it the region by stating this.

Military faction of al-Jama'a al-Islamiyya Deputy leader of Al-Qaeda Ayman al-Zawahiri announced that a faction of Al-Gama'a al-Islamiyya has become Al-Qaeda's branch in Egypt in a video released on the internet on 5 August 2006. Zawahiri said "We bring good tidings to the Muslim nation about a big faction of the knights of Al-Gama'a Islamiyya uniting with Al-Qaeda," and the move aimed to help "rally the Muslim nation's capabilities in a unified rank in the face of the most severe crusader campaign against Islam in its history." An Al-Gama'a leader, Muhammad al-Hukaymah, appeared in the video and confirmed this move. However, Hukaymah acknowledged that other Al-Gama'a members had "reverted" from the militant course he was adhering to, and some Al-Gama'a representatives also denied that they were joining forces with the international Al-Qaeda network.

=== Allied Groups ===
The Mujahideen Shura Council, not related to the Mujahideen Shura Council in Iraq, is located in Egypt's Sinai Peninsula and is also known to be linked with Al-Qaeda. After an attack in June 2012, the MSC called the attack "a gift" to Ayman al-Zawahiri and their Al-Qaeda "brothers." The MSC is one of four known organizations that are linked with Al-Qaeda and operating in Gaza.

Jund al-Sharia is yet another group present in the Sinai Peninsula. They do not appear to necessarily be linked directly with Al-Qaeda, but since they are located in the same proximity and share enemies, it is assumed that they have communicated in some way. They announced their formation on 1 August 2012, demanding that Islamic law be established in Egypt and US Peacekeeping forces be removed from the area.

== Leaders ==
Reports have surfaced from a remote part of Egypt that Osama bin Laden's former personal doctor is leading Al-Qaeda in Sinai Peninsula. According to reports, sources have told several Egyptian media outlets that Ramzi Mowafi has been leading a group responsible for numerous attacks in the lawless Sinai Peninsula over the past two years. Reports say that Mowafi – who is believed to also be an explosives expert – was spotted in the Sinai in August 2011 providing military training to a number of people. Mowafi is also believed to have worked on chemical weapons for Al Qaeda and was involved in a January 2011 prison break that allowed former Egyptian President Mohamed Morsi to escape with other senior leaders from the Muslim Brotherhood. However, public information about Mowafi is limited. The report from 2011 is significant because Mowafi was seen in the Sinai about the same time that Al Qaeda in the Sinai Peninsula's Ansar al Jihad declared its foundation. In addition, the al-Qaeda logo appeared in various mosques in the area, suggesting that the Mowafi is the Emir of Al Qaeda in the Sinai. On 21 October 2014, the United States Department of State designated Mowafi a specially designated global terrorist, because of his long-time role in the al-Qaeda organization, and for his group's terrorist activities during the Sinai insurgency.

=== Mohammed Eid Muslih Hamad ===
Mohammed Eid Muslih Hamad, also known to some as "El Tihi," is one of the earliest known leaders of Al-Qaeda in Sinai Peninsula. Before his arrest in November 2011, he was allegedly involved in terror attacks on Egyptian police forces, a bombing of a pipeline that runs from Egypt to Jordan and Israel, and an attack in southern Israel.

=== Ramzi Mowafi ===
Ramzi Mowafi, commonly referred to as "The Chemist," is thought to be the leader of the entire Al-Qaeda in Sinai Peninsula organization. Mowafi was known to be Osama bin Laden's personal physician and also a chemical weapons and explosive expert for Al-Qaeda in Afghanistan. In January 2011, he escaped from the Wadi el-Natrun prison in Egypt, where he was being held on unknown charges for life. In August 2011, he was spotted training a number of insurgents in military tactics. On 21 October 2013, Mowafi was added to the US State Department's terrorist designation list.

== Other Commanders ==
Some other known commanders of AQSP are the following:

- Ahmed Ashoush, leader of Ansar al-Sharia
- Hisham Ali Ashmawi, leader of Jamaat al-Murabiteen
- Muhammad Jamal al Kashef, leader of Mohammed Jamal network
- Muhammad al-Zawahiri, senior operative (alleged), and brother of Al-Qaeda's general Emir, Ayman al-Zawahiri.
- Sheikh ‘Adel Shehato, one of the leaders of Nasr city cell

== Notable Attacks ==
18 June 2012 – MSC; IED attack inside Israel territory: Workers were securing the Israeli border with Egypt, when one of their construction vehicles became a target for an IED.

5 August 2012 – Jund; Overran Egyptian base and killed 16 soldiers; made it half a mile inside Israeli territory before they were stopped. The terrorists were killed by the Israeli Air Force and soldiers.

25 September 2012 – Unnamed jihadist group; attack on international troops at a base in the Egyptian Sinai. The terrorists breached the perimeter and wounded four soldiers in the attack. Reportedly, before they exited, the attackers hoisted a black al-Qaeda flag over the base.

== Timeline ==
- 2 August 2011 – A group claiming to be the Sinai wing of Al-Qaeda declared its intention to create an Islamic caliphate in the Sinai.
- 12 August 2011 – Egyptian military and intelligence officials said they were preparing to launch an operation against al Qaeda cells that had recently been established in the restive Sinai peninsula.
- 13 November 2011 – Egyptian police arrested the head of al Qaeda's branch in the Sinai, Mohammed Eid Muslih Hamad, in El Arish. He has been behind six bombings of a pipeline to Israel and Jordan.
- 22 December 2011 – Ansar al Jihad, the fighter arm of al-Qaeda in Sinai, declared formation in a statement.
- 24 January 2012 – Ansar al Jihad swore and officially its allegiance to al-Qaeda's second Emir after Bin Laden's death, Ayman al-Zawahiri.
- 5 August 2012 – al-Qaeda in Sinai Peninsula and other Qaeda affiliates, overrun an Egyptian Army outpost on Israeli border killing more than 10 Egypt soldiers.
- 12 September 2012 – militants raising al-Qaeda flags attacked an UN peacekeepers' base in Sinai.
- 25 March 2013 – 25 Hamas and AQSP fighters and terrorists were captured by Egypt army.
- 23 April 2013 – Egyptian authorities seized explosives in a desert area in Sinai near the Gaza Strip border, a security official said. The explosives were believed to be owned by al-Qaeda.
- 17 July 2013 – It was reported that Ramzi Mowafi is heading the al-Qaeda in Sinai Peninsula.
- 21 July 2013 – Israeli military intelligence website Debkafile's terrorist experts estimate that Mowafi has grown an army of 7,000 to 9,000 Al-Qaeda fighters in Sinai.
- 21 January 2014 – The Egyptian army destroyed tunnels, captured a tree, and bombarded two houses, of suspected AQSP militants, in the Sinai region. They also arrested a suspected militant in al-Sakaska village west of el-Arish and five people in Beir al-Abed.
- 21 October 2014 – The U.S State department designated Mowafi a special global terrorist for his role in al-Qaeda in Sinai Peninsula.
- July 2015 – Hisham Ali Ashmawi, a former Egyptian Special Forces officer who is openly loyal to al Qaeda in Sinai, released a video message in which he declared the formation of Jamaat al-Murabiteen, a group of AQSP.
- 11 March 2016 – Hisham Ali Ashmawi, released an audio message in which he called on scholars to support al-Qaeda's cause in the region.
- 21 February 2017 – 10 AQSP fighters sentenced to death for links with Al Qaeda.
- 20 October 2017 – AQSP militants attacked Egypt security forces in Sinai's western deserts, killing 16 soldiers. In the days that followed, Egypt's airforce killed the Al-Qaeda leader of the attack, who is believed to be the Hisham Ali Ashmawi's deputy, Abd al-Hamid. Another suspected terrorist was captured, a Libyan, named Abdelrahim Mohamed Al-Mesmari, along with 15 fellow suspected terrorists.
- 17 November 2017 – Ansar al-Islam claimed that its fighters clashed with fighters from Islamic State of Iraq and the Levant – Sinai Province, saying that they will "end" the other Jihadist group, after three and more years of the group inactivity.
- 30 January 2018 – Egypt's government said that dozens of its army soldiers and officers defected to AQSP as of 30 January 2017.
- 8 October 2018 – Libyan forces arrested Al-Mourabitoun leader Hisham al-Ashmawy, and his bodyguard Safwat Zeidan, in Derna.

Their operations have ceased since then, and it appears that the organization has become defunct.
