= Ansar al-Sharia (Egypt) =

Radical Islamist group that operates in Egypt

كتيبة أنصار الشريعة (Ansar al-Sharia Battalion) Partisans of Sharia
- Leader: Ahmed Ashush
- Dates active: November 2012–May 2018
- Active regions: Egypt
- Ideology: Islamism; Islamic extremism Islamic fundamentalism Salafist Jihadism
- Part of: Al-Qaeda in Sinai Peninsula

al-Taliah al-Salafiyah al-Mujahediyah Ansar al-Sharia (English: Fighting Salafist Vanguard – Partisans of Islamic Law), better known by the name Ansar al-Sharia (Egypt), was a radical Islamist group that operated in Egypt.

== Background ==
Following the Egyptian revolution in 2011, many imprisoned members of Egypt's Jihadist movements were released from prison, and there was an easing of restraints on free speech. This allowed radical followers of Salafist Jihadism to resume their activities, garner support and recruit followers. Amongst those released from prison was Ahmad Ashoush, aka Abu Nizar. In 1989, Ashoush participated in the Jihad in Afghanistan, where he became a close friend of Mohammed Atef, who would later become the military chief of Al Qaeda, and became acquainted with Osama bin Laden and Ayman Al-Zawahiri. In 1991 he returned to Egypt with a group of other Egyptians, founding the jihadi group Vanguards of Conquest, but was arrested in 1993 along with 150 of his followers and remained imprisoned until the revolution.

Ashoush founded Ansar al-Sharia in November 2012. The same name has been used by Salafist Jihadist groups created in Yemen, Tunisia, Libya and elsewhere. The group releases statements through its media branch, al-Bayyan Media Foundation.

In July 2013, in the wake of the 2013 Egyptian coup d'état, a representative of a group of Salafist jihadists in the Sinai Peninsula announced the formation of a group called Ansar al-Sharia in Egypt. At the time of this announcement, it was unclear what, if any connection there is with Ashoush's group. In the following weeks, all of the key members of Ansar al-Sharia were either arrested, joined the Ansar Bayt al-Maqdis faction in the Sinai insurgency, or fled to Syria to take part in the Civil War.

In March 2014, another group called Kataeb Ansar al Sharia fi Ard al Kinanah, Brigades of Ansar al Sharia in the Land of Egypt, announced its formation and claimed responsibility for a series of shootings of Egyptian security personnel.

== Ideology ==
In its founding statement, the group outlines its goals including: implementation of sharia, the re-establishment of the Caliphate, supporting the mujahideen and liberating Muslim lands from occupation.

In December 2012, the head of the Egyptian Federation of Human Rights requested the arrest of members of Ansar al-Sharia, after they posted online a list of prominent Egyptian personalities who should be assassinated should the state fail.

== Relation to other groups ==
Ashoush, in 2012, claimed to be honored to be a part of al-Qaeda. Thus, he claimed that his group is part of a broader Al-Qaeda network in the region by stating this.
