= Al Furqan Brigades =

The Al Furqan Brigades (Arabic: كتائب الفرقان, also known as Kitaa’ib al-Furqan) was an Islamic militant group that has been active throughout Egypt from to 2012 to 2014 .

== History ==
According to the National Security Agency, Al Furqan Brigades the group has received significant support and training from the Al-Qassam Brigades in Gaza.

== Attacks ==
- In August 31, attackers fired rocket propelled grenades at the Cosco Asia cargo ship when it passed through the Suez Canal in Qantara, Port Said, the ship only suffered minor damages and the Egyptian Authorities announced they arrested the 3 militants involved in the attack
- In September 30, the group claimed in a video the killing of the Colonel Mohammed al Komi (occurred in August 14) in a drive-by attack in the Cairo-Ismailia desert highway, and the attack against a civilian accused of being an "apostate".
- In October 7, the Furqan Brigades claimed an attack with rocket-propelled grenade at the Amaadi Satellite Earth station in Cairo, Cairo Governorate, leaving two people wounded and a satellite dish damage.

- In November 29, the al Nusrah Battalion, a unit within the al Furqan Brigades claimed via a video a string of shootings including the murder of Lieutenant Ahmed Ibrahim along with five officers.
