= August 2012 Sinai attack =

2012 attack on Egyptian and Israeli forces by insurgents in the Sinai Peninsula

- Part of Sinai insurgency
- The attack site
- Location: 31°13′N 34°17′E; Sinai Peninsula, Egypt and Kerem Shalom border crossing
- Date: 5 August 2012; 14 years ago
- Target: Egyptian military base, Kerem Shalom border crossing.
- Weapons: Rocket-propelled grenades, armored cars
- Deaths: 16 Egyptian soldiers, 8 gunmen
- Injuries: 7
- Perpetrator: Mainly Bedouin residents of the Sinai
- No. of participants: 35
- Motive: Unknown

The August 2012 Sinai attack occurred on 5 August 2012, when armed men ambushed an Egyptian military base in the Sinai Peninsula, killing 16 soldiers and stealing two armored cars, which they used to infiltrate into Israel. The attackers broke through the Kerem Shalom border crossing to Israel, where one of the vehicles exploded. They then engaged in a firefight with soldiers of the Israel Defense Forces (IDF), during which six of the attackers were killed. No Israelis were injured.

The attack led to sharp condemnations from Israeli and Egyptian authorities. Israeli Prime Minister Benjamin Netanyahu expressed his condolences for the Egyptian soldiers killed, and praised IDF troops for their preparedness and handling of the attack. Israeli Defense Minister Ehud Barak warned that the incident should be a "wake up call" for Egypt in dealing with terrorists in the Sinai Peninsula, while Egyptian President Mohamed Morsi vowed to retake the Sinai Peninsula and declared three days of mourning. The Egyptian government also closed the Rafah Border Crossing to the Gaza Strip.

== Background ==
=== Post-Egyptian revolution ===
Following the Egyptian Revolution of 2011, militant organizations increased their activity in the Sinai Peninsula, and some al-Qaeda-linked groups were established as well. These militants have been frequently attacking and bombing gas pipelines in the Sinai running between Egypt and Israel. As of July 2012, there have been 15 bombings on these gas pipelines since the 2011 uprising.

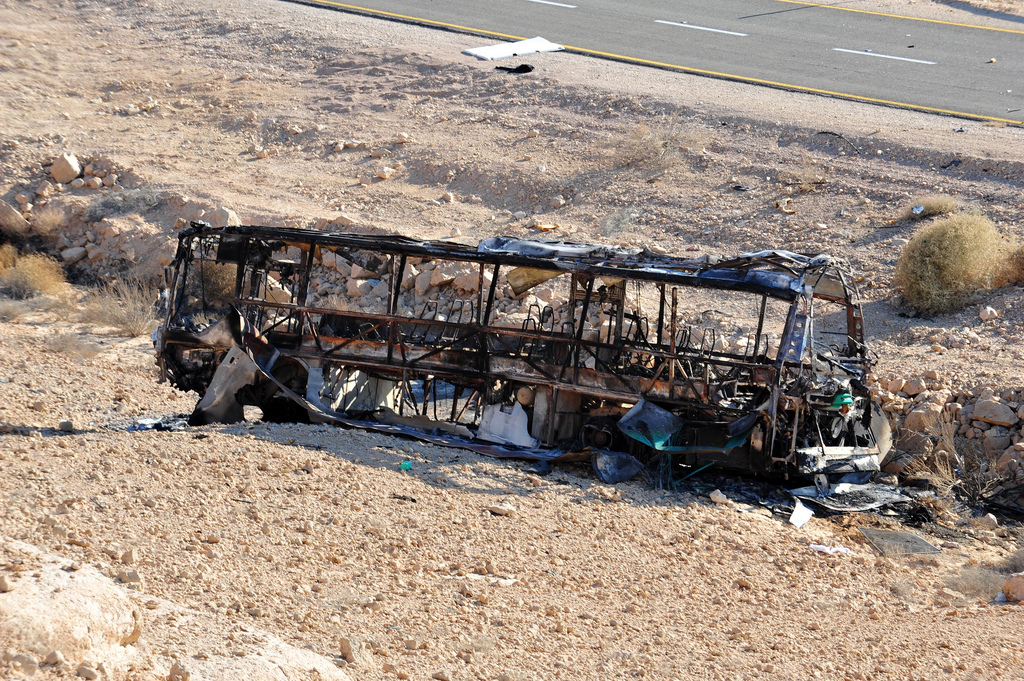
The charred remains of an Egged bus destroyed by a suicide bomber during the August 2011 attacks

In August 2011, a series of cross-border attacks were carried out in southern Israel on Highway 12 near the Egyptian border via the Sinai Peninsula. The terrorists opened fire on the bus No. 392 near Eilat, operated by the company Egged and soon thereafter, a bomb was detonated next to an Israeli army patrol along the Egypt–Israel border. A third attack occurred when an anti-tank missile hit a private vehicle, killing four civilians. Eight Israelis – six civilians, one Yamam Special Unit police officer, and one Golani Brigade soldier – were killed during the multi-pronged attack. The Israeli security forces reported eight attackers killed, and Egyptian security forces reported killing another two.

In July 2012, IDF intelligence chief Aviv Kochavi told the Knesset Foreign Affairs and Defense Committee that the IDF has stopped approximately a dozen attacks against Israel from the Sinai Peninsula.

On 31 July 2012, the United States Department of State's Office of the Coordinator for Counterterrorism warned in a report, "The smuggling of humans, weapons, cash, and other contraband through the Sinai into Israel and Gaza created criminal networks with possible ties to terrorist groups in the region. The smuggling of weapons from Libya through Egypt has increased since the overthrow of the Qaddafi regime." Haaretz reported that forces from al-Qaeda, supported by the local Bedouin, have been stationed in the Sinai. It also reported that several other terrorist groups in Gaza have been assisting these forces, and were also smuggling weapons and goods into Gaza.

=== August 2012 ===
In early August 2012, Israel's National Security Council's counter-terrorism bureau renewed its travel advisory against visiting the Sinai Peninsula, due to information on potential terrorist attacks against tourists, including kidnappings. The warning may have been due to Hamas' release of Abu Walid al-Maqdisi, a Salafi leader of an al-Qaeda-affiliated terrorist group, responsible for three bombings in Dahab in 2006, and which is believed to have close ties with terror cells operating in the Sinai Peninsula. The following day, the United States also issued a travel warning to Americans to "take precautions in travel to the Sinai" and warned that "overland travel from Israel to the Sinai in particular is strongly discouraged."

Over the weekend prior to the attack on the border, various intelligence reports reaching the IDF's Southern Command warned of an impending attack. Specific information regarding the time, target, and location of the attack could not be ascertained. Still, Southern Command Major General Tal Russo prepared his troops in case of an attack. Armored, Engineering, and Infantry soldiers were placed on high alert while the Israeli Air Force was deployed in the area as reinforcement. Russo evacuated troops from the Kerem Shalom border crossing, where the militants would later break through, in anticipation of them coming under attack.

Egyptian intelligence chief Morad Mowafi said that Egypt had also received comprehensive intelligence warnings before the attack took place. However, the Egyptian authorities never imagined that this type of attack would happen, in which "a Muslim would kill a Muslim on the hour of breaking the fast in Ramadan."

== Attack ==
The attackers approached an Egyptian military base in the Sinai Peninsula in three Land Rovers at sundown, during the iftar meal, which breaks the day's fast during the Muslim month of Ramadan, and succeeded in taking control of the base while the soldiers were sitting down in the dining hall for the iftar meal. The attackers were dressed as Bedouins and attacked with guns and rocket-propelled grenades. Thirty-five attackers took part in this attack on the Egyptian base.

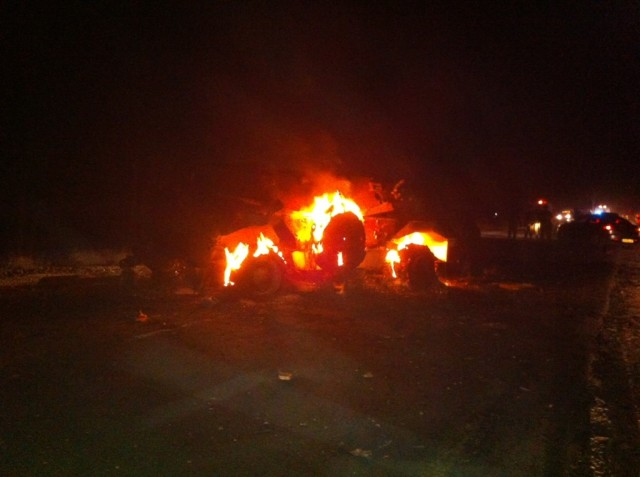
The APC used by the gunmen after being struck by the Israeli Air Force

After firing on the police, the gunmen commandeered two Fahd wheeled armored personnel carriers and attempted to break through the Kerem Shalom checkpoint into Israel. A few minutes before the gunmen infiltrated across the border, IDF troops received an alert regarding a possible breach of the Egyptian–Israeli border. This followed intelligence informing the IDF that an Egyptian border patrol post had recently been surrounded. One of the APCs was driven into the checkpoint, where it exploded, apparently booby-trapped. The other vehicle crossed into Israel and drove for approximately 100 meters on the highway before encountering troops from the IDF Bedouin Reconnaissance Battalion, which opened fire on the vehicle but failed to stop its advance. The IDF then sent three tanks onto the highway, but the vehicle accelerated away.

After driving about 2 km into Israel, and heading towards Kibbutz Kerem Shalom at a speed of 70 kilometers per hour (43.5 miles per hour), the APC was destroyed by the Israeli Air Force with a missile. This bombing was unprecedented, as it took place inside Israeli territory. Some of the gunmen managed to escape the wreckage and were then killed by Israeli troops after a short exchange of fire. Israeli soldiers had been previously warned of an impending attack and had recently increased patrols to the area. Arab Bedouin troops of the Israel Defense Forces were instrumental in reconnaissance and thwarting the attack.

The remaining attackers tried to escape to the Gaza Strip, but were prevented from doing so by Egyptian army forces.

Sixteen Egyptian police officers were killed in the raid, as well as an unspecified number of the attackers. Seven more police officers were wounded. The Israeli Army later reported it had found the bodies of five gunmen from the raid, while Egyptian authorities reported that they had the bodies of at least three gunmen. Following the attack, Israel transferred the bodies on its side of the border to the Egyptian authorities.

== Reactions ==
No group claimed responsibility for the attack. Israeli and Egyptian authorities believe that the perpetrators belonged to a global jihad network, and were assisted by Bedouin tribes in the Sinai in return for money.

The New York Times and BBC described the attack as a sign that armed groups were continuing to grow in power in the Sinai region, which was "slipping from [Egypt]'s control". Haaretz stated that the incident showed that Islamists had begun to target Egyptians along with Israelis.

=== Egypt ===
Following the attack, state television reported that foreign Islamist militants were responsible for perpetrating the attack. In addition, the Egyptian government indefinitely closed the Rafah border crossing to the Gaza Strip.

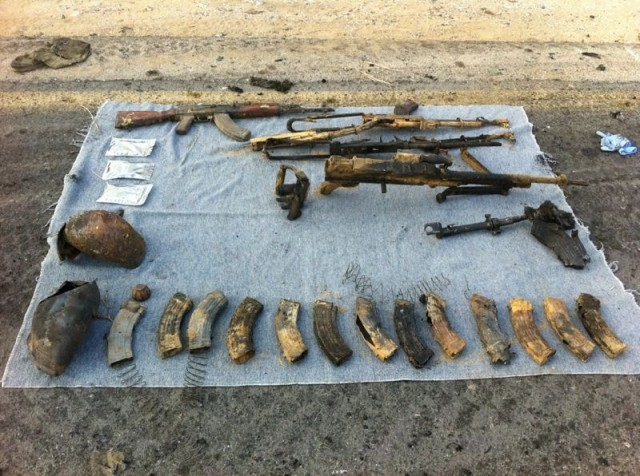
Weapons that were used during the attack

President Mohamed Morsi labelled the attack as "vicious," and said that the perpetrators, along with those cooperating with the perpetrators, would "pay a high price," regardless of whether they're inside or outside Egyptian territory. Morsi ordered security forces to take complete control over the Sinai, and declared three days of mourning to honor the 16 Egyptian soldiers who were killed.

The army said that "elements" in the Gaza Strip helped the perpetrators by firing mortars during the attack. The daily al-Youm al-Saba'a quoted a senior Egyptian security official, who said that Islamic Jihad militants from Gaza and global jihad (Jihad al-Alami) fighters from Egypt perpetrated the attack. CNN cited an anonymous 'Egyptian general' who said the Hamas breakaway group 'Al-Galgala Army' is behind the border attack . The MENA news agency said that the attackers were jihadists who had "infiltrated from Gaza through tunnels," and had collaborated with "jihadist elements."

The Muslim Brotherhood released a statement calling on the government to "confront this serious challenge to the Egyptian sovereignty" as well as to "protect Sinai from all armed groups." The party also claimed on its website that the attack "can be attributed to the Mossad", Israel's intelligence service, in an effort to destabilize the government, which the Israeli foreign ministry denied as "nonsense."

On 6 August, the military deployed at least two helicopter gunships to the Sinai in search of members of the group that perpetrated the attack. The army also arrested several suspects in the Sinai, and confiscated vehicles which did not contain license plates.

On 7 August, at a funeral for the soldiers who were killed, Prime Minister Hesham Qandil was assaulted and attacked by angry mourners, who also vandalized his car. In addition, Kandil was pelted with shoes, while some angry mourners chanted, "The Brotherhood and Hamas are one dirty hand."

Minister of Tourism Hisham Zazou denied that the attack caused a decrease in tourism, and said that tourism agencies had not cancelled reservations and that Zazou was personally calling them to ensure this was true. Zazou stressed that tourists should feel secure in Egypt.

On 8 August, Egyptian officials told Al-Hayat that they believe that members of the Gaza-based Army of Islam, or Jaysh al-Islam, designated as a terrorist group by the United States, participated in the attack.

On the same day, President Morsi fired intelligence chief Murad Mowafi and temporarily replaced him with Mohammed Raafat Shehata. Morsi also fired the governor of Northern Sinai and the presidential guard's commander, and named new chiefs for Cairo's security forces and the police's large central security. In addition, Morsi asked Defense Minister Mohamed Hussein Tantawi to replace the military police's commander.

On 9 August, a Palestinian daily reported that Egypt's General Intelligence demanded the extradition of three senior members of Hamas's armed wing, the Izz ad-Din al-Qassam Brigades, for their involvement in the attack. One security source said that it is believed that they have delivered "indirect logistical support" to a radical group located in the Sinai, which perpetrated the attack. Palestinian Authority security forces said that the three men are Raed Attar, Ayman Nofal, and Muhammad Abu-Shamalah. Attar is the commander of the brigades in Gaza, and was involved in the abduction of Gilad Shalit in 2006. Although Hamas was willing to deliver the senior Hamas members to Egypt, the men refused, saying that they were scared of being tortured by the Egyptian authorities, but they agreed to allow Egyptian intelligence authorities question them in Gaza.

That same day, an initial forensic report on the bodies of the gunmen suggested that the perpetrators were wearing military uniforms created in the Palestinian city of Nablus. The forensic report says that all the perpetrators were men in their thirties with "Arab features."

On 19 August, a North Sinai security official said that ten Yemeni militants infiltrated the country two months prior to the attack and trained local jihadi cells in the Sinai. He stated that Egypt had received intelligence that these militants were communicating with jihadist groups in Al Mukataa, south of Sheikh Zuwayed. Bedouin leader Ibrahim Al Menei said that the Yemeni militants were smuggled in from Sudan with African migrants, and that word spread among the community. Another Bedouin leader, Salem Aneizan, also said that he heard the Yemeni militants were training jihadists in North Sinai.

==== Operations ====
A few days after the attack, forces from the army and the police engaged in an operation against armed men who have been targeting security personnel in North Sinai. A number of clashes between armed men and security forces in the Sinai have erupted since then, and Egyptian security officials have conducted raids on militant hideouts as well.

=== Israel ===
Following the attack, Israeli residents of the Eshkol Region were instructed to stay in their homes as soldiers searched the area for remaining attackers.

Officials said that the attack may have been intended to abduct an IDF soldier, or to infiltrate a nearby community to attack civilians. Defense Minister Ehud Barak said that the attack showed the need for "determined Egyptian action" against terrorism in Sinai, while Prime Minister Benjamin Netanyahu expressed regret over the deaths of the Egyptian soldiers and hope that that incident would be a "wake-up call" to Egyptian forces.

IDF Chief of Staff Lt. Gen. Gantz said, "Even before investigations of the attack are complete, I estimate we prevented a large-scale disaster, an extremely complex attack by terrorists operating between Sinai and the Gaza Strip. This was an extremely successful joint operation of the IAF and Armored Corps." He also expressed his "appreciation for the alertness of the forces, specifically the alertness of the intelligence, and the determination of the soldiers operating in the field."

Two days after the attack, Israel said that it was willing to consider any Egyptian request to deploy additional military troops in the Sinai Peninsula, in order to retake control of the Sinai and eliminate any global jihad militant infrastructure. Furthermore, Deputy Prime Minister and Minister for Intelligence Dan Meridor said that Israel would not object to Egypt bringing heavier military forces into the Sinai Peninsula in order to combat terror groups. Under a peace treaty between Egypt and Israel, the peninsula is supposed to remain demilitarized, but Israel permitted the Egyptians to deploy about seven battalions in the peninsula to enforce control. Israel hopes that in this way, Egypt will be more able to eliminate terrorists that pose a threat to Egypt and Israel.

Deputy Foreign Minister Danny Ayalon said that Israel and Egypt would increase security cooperation following the attack, and said that they already saw improvements on the ground. Ayalon said that it is in Egypt's interest as well to gain control of the Sinai Peninsula.

=== Palestinians ===
Hamas condemned the attack as an "ugly crime" and offered condolences to Egypt. However, a Hamas official also condemned Egypt's decision to shut the Rafah crossing, describing it as "collective punishment". Palestinian security officials expressed concern that the attack could worsen relations between Egypt and the Gaza Strip government, and said that for this reason Israeli forces might have been behind the assault. They also expressed worry that Egypt might retaliate with the large military force deployed to the region. A Hamas official claimed that the attack "only serves the interests of the Zionist enemy."

On 9 August, Gazan philanthropist Abdul Dayem Abu-Midin promised to give $10,000 to each individual family related to the Egyptian soldiers who were killed during the attack, telling a Hamas-affiliated center that he is doing this out of "the love of a Palestinian citizen to a sister-nation."

On 9 August, Hamas rebuked Egypt for maintaining its closure of the Egyptian–Gazan border. Interior Minister Fathi Hammad compared the situation to that of Mubarak's era, during which Mubarak enforced a blockade on Gaza. Since the time of its closure after the 5 August attacks, Egypt has only opened the borders briefly and temporarily.

On 11 August, the Palestinian Authority requested that Egypt destroy all of the smuggling tunnels located under the Egypt-Gaza border, which would enforce a stricter Egyptian blockade on Gaza. This request was the first time that the Palestinian Authority publicly demanded the destruction of these tunnels, saying that the tunnels do not contribute to the Gazan economy and were only used by a few people for personal gain.

PA officials also insisted that some of the gunmen in the border attack had come from the Gaza Strip. They provided the names of several suspects from Gaza to the Egyptian authorities. One official said, "We have good reason to believe that terrorist groups from the Gaza Strip were involved in the attack. These groups operate under the watchful eye of the Hamas government and sometimes even receive support from it."

=== United Nations ===
United Nations Secretary-General Ban Ki-moon strongly condemned the attack as an act of terrorism, noting that it killed 16 Egyptian soldiers and put Israeli citizens at risk, and conveyed his condolences to the families of the victims. He added, "Such attacks are totally unacceptable. The Secretary-General hopes that the perpetrators will be swiftly identified and brought to justice." Mr. Ki-moon also hoped for a swift recovery for those injured in the attack.

=== Other states ===
- Bahrain — Bahrain strongly condemned and denounced the attack as a terrorist attack, saying that it was "a heinous act contravening Islamic precepts, religious creeds, ethical and human values." Bahrain expressed complete solidarity with Egypt and expressed its full support of the measures undertaken by Egypt to create security and stability in the Sinai. Bahrain also expressed its condolences to the victims' families and wished the injured a quick recovery, and said that Bahrain condemns "all forms of terrorism, regardless of its sources."
- France — France condemned the attack in the Sinai and urged Egypt to exert control over the region, saying that they were concerned with the deteriorating security situation in the Sinai.
- Jordan — Jordan condemned the attack as a terrorist attack, and said that Jordan "supports Egypt in fighting all forms of terrorism, which has caused the suffering of many people around the world."
- Russia — The Russian foreign ministry condemned the attack as a terrorist attack, and said that the attack "was received with grave concern and condemnation." The ministry expressed its condolences to Egypt, as well as their "understanding and solidarity with the counter-terrorism actions taken by Egyptian and Israeli sides to ensure order and stability." The ministry also said that Russia firmly believes "that terrorism in all its forms cannot and shall not be excused. We hope that as a result of the measures taken situation in the Sinai Peninsula will return back to normal, ensuring the proper level of security." The ministry recommended Russians in Egypt to take precautions, and not to travel outside the Sinai's resort areas.
- United States of America — The United States condemned the attack as a terrorist attack, and offered condolences to the victims and families, as well as President Morsi. The United States said that if asked by the Egyptian authorities, "we stand ready to assist the government of Egypt as it acts on President Morsi's pledge to secure the Sinai and address the threats of violent extremism."

=== Parties and Organizations ===
- United Kingdom - In an appearance on Press TV future head of the Labour Party Jeremy Corbyn questioned the idea that Islamic terrorists were behind it and instead suggested that it was the "Hand of Israel". These comments resurfaced in the late 2010s and were criticized in Haaretz and by historian Dominic Green.

== See also ==
- Operation Eagle
- Operation Sinai
- Terrorism in Egypt
- 2011 southern Israel cross-border attacks
