= Debkafile =

Privately operated Israeli website

DEBKAfile

- Website type: private website
- Available in: English/Hebrew
- Owner: DEBKA Publications
- Creators: Giora Shamis and Diane Shalem
- Website: www.debka.com
- Commercial: Yes
- Registration: Optional
- Launched: June 2000; 26 years ago
- Current status: Inactive since 24 Jule 2023, but site is online

DEBKAfile (Hebrew: תיק דבקה) was a privately operated Israeli website based in Jerusalem, providing commentary and analyses on terrorism, intelligence, national security, military and international relations, with a particular focus on the Middle East. It was available in both English and Hebrew. DEBKAfile operated for over 20 years. The site is inactive since 24 June 2023, after founder died, but still online.

The word "debka" refers to the Arab folk dance dabke.

== History ==
The site started in the summer of 2000, and was operated from the Jerusalem home of journalists Giora Shamis and Diane Shalem, both of whom worked for more than 20 years covering foreign policy and intelligence issues for the London-based Economist. In the 2000s, it was awarded “Best of the Web” status by Forbes. Forbes identified the archives as the best part of the website, but warned that "most of the information is attributed to unidentified sources."

The website was suspended in October 2014, following its own report of the illness of its chief editor. The website resumed coverage in December 2014.

Another apparent pause in publication occurred after an August 24, 2022 article was posted and articles did not continue to resume regularly until December 2022.

In September 2023, a note on the website indicated that it was closing down, following the passing of its founder Giora Shamis.

== Criticism ==
Wired.com's Noah Shachtman wrote in 2001 that the site "clearly reports with a point of view; the site is unabashedly in the hawkish camp of Israeli politics". Yediot Achronot investigative reporter Ronen Bergman stated that the site relies on information from sources with an agenda, such as neo-conservative elements of the US Republican Party, "whose worldview is that the situation is bad and is only going to get worse," and that Israeli intelligence officials do not consider even 10 percent of the site's content to be reliable.

The site's operators, in contrast, state that 80 percent of what Debka reports turns out to be true, and point to its year 2000 prediction that al-Qaeda would again strike the World Trade Center, and that it had warned well before the 2006 war in Lebanon that Hezbollah had amassed 12,000 Katyusha rockets pointed at northern Israel.
