= Rami Hassanein =

Egyptian officer (born 1975)

- رامي محمد حسنين محمد
- Born: Ramy Mohamed Hassanein Mohamed; 1975; Itay El Barud, Beheira Governorate, Egypt
- Died: October 29, 2016 (aged 40–41) near Sheikh Zuweid, North Sinai Governorate, Egypt
- Cause of death: IED explosion
- Burial place: Itay El Barud
- Alma mater: Egyptian Military College; Military Academy for Postgraduate and Strategic Studies
- Military career
- Allegiance: Egyptian Army
- Branch: El-Sa'ka Forces; MONUSCO
- Rank: Colonel staff
- Unit: 103rd Thunderbolt Battalion
- Commands: Commander of the 103rd Thunderbolt Battalion
- Conflicts: Operation Martyr's Right †

Rami Mohamed Hassanein Mohamed (Arabic: رامي محمد حسنين محمد; 1975-October 29, 2016) was an Egyptian officer who served as the commander of the 103rd Thunderbolt Battalion, one of the El-Sa'ka Forces of the Egyptian Army stationed in North Sinai Governorate. Hassanein was killed during an IED explosion south of Sheikh Zuweid during Operation Martyr's Right of the Sinai insurgency.

== Biography ==
Hassanein was born in Itay El Barud, Beheira Governorate, Egypt in 1975. He graduated from the Egyptian Military College in July 1996, and served in an infantry unit and then in a commando unit. Hassanein then obtained a master's degree in military science from the Military Academy for Postgraduate and Strategic Studies. He rose through the ranks of the Egyptian Army, being promoted to the commander of the 103rd Thunderbolt Battalion in 2015. Prior to his promotion, Hassanein served in the Egyptian contingent of MONUSCO.

Hassanein was killed on October 29, 2016, when his Humvee drove over an IED between the al-Saddah and al-Wahshi checkpoints south of Sheikh Zuweid in North Sinai Governorate. Hassanein was at the time fighting in Operation Martyr's Right against the Islamic State – Sinai Province. His funeral took place in Itay El Barud, and the governor of Beheira along with other Thunderbolt commanders and Egyptian politicians and officials were present. Ahmed Mansi succeeded Hassanein as commander of the 103rd battalion until Mansi's death in 2017.

== Legacy ==
Hassanein was played by Ahmed Salah Hosny in the Egyptian TV show Al Ekhtiyar. Hassanein's character appeared in three episodes of the show. A school in Beheira Governorate, a street and pedestrian bridge in Itay El Barud, and an auditorium at the College of Education at Damanhour University was named after Hassanein.
