= Al Buhayrah =

Al Buhayrah may refer to:

- Al Buhayrah, Yemen
- Al Buhayrah Governorate, one of the Governorates of Egypt
- Lac Region, Chad, named Al Buhayrah in Arabic
- Lac Prefecture, Chad
