= El Delengat =

El Delengat الدلنجات
- Town and Markaz
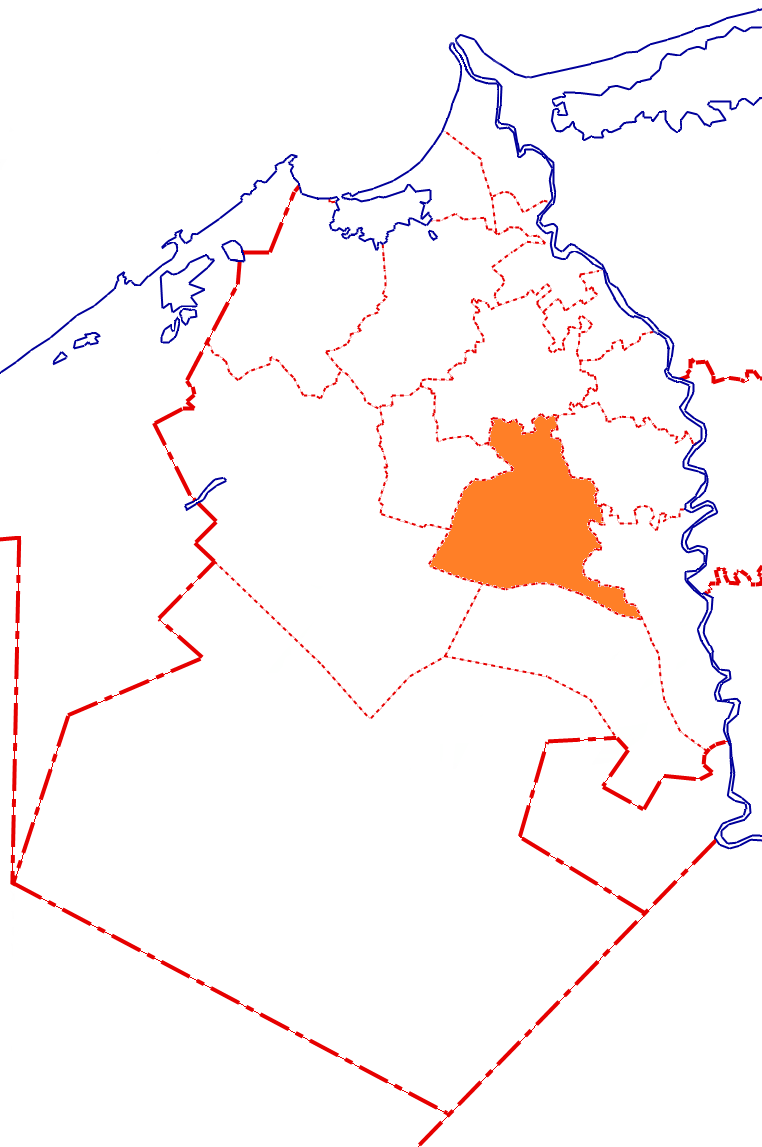
- Location in Beheira Governorate

- Location in Egypt
- Coordinates: 30°49′40″N 30°32′05″E
- Country: Egypt
- Governorate: Beheira Governorate

Area
  - Town and Markaz: 1,315 km^{2} (508 sq mi)
  - Urban: 22.0 km^{2} (8.5 sq mi)
- Elevation: 5 m (16 ft)

Population (2023)
  - Town and Markaz: 441,431
  - Density: 335.7/km^{2} (869.4/sq mi)
  - Urban: 71,361
- Time zone: UTC+2 (EET)
  - Summer (DST): UTC+3 (EEST)

El Delengat (Arabic: الدلنجات) is a town and markaz in Beheira Governorate in Egypt

== Geography ==
El Delengat is about 21 kilometers south of Damanhour the governorate's capital. It is bordered to the south by the Tahrir region, to the east by Kom Hamada, Itay El Barud, and to the west by Hosh Essa. It includes 5 local village units, 45 villages, and 771 followers. The city is famous for agriculture, industry, trade and investment, and it contains urban, rural and Bedouin, and the education rate is high in urban and rural areas, and Aldlnjat participate in the third section of football.

Among the most important quarters of the city of Delengat:

- Al-Rawda quarter
- Al-Zahra quarter (New Delengat)
- Hammouda quarter
- Al-Ashlam quarter
- Sidi Hamad quarter
- Hindi quarter
- Al-Taflah quarter
- Al-Fakharani quarter
- Downtown quarter
- Al-Aqraa quarter
- Al-Saha'a quarter
- Al-Sawy quarter
- Abboud quarter

== History ==
The history of the Delengat dates back to the era of the Pharaohs, where there are several archaeological sites dating back to 2000 BC, such as the Kom King Freen, which is located in the village of Kom Fren Baldengat, which is one of the most important and largest archaeological hills.

During the 19th Dynasty in the era of Ramesses II, a fortress was built from the fortification system erected by King Ramses II in the west of the Delta to defend the western borders of Egypt from the raids coming from the Libyan Desert, which is located in the north of the city.

The 1885 Census of Egypt recorded El Delengat (as El-Delingat) as a nahiyah in its own district in Beheira Governorate; at that time, the population of the town was 1,768 (939 men and 859 women).
