= Operation Sinai =

Operation Sinai may refer to:

- Sinai and Palestine campaign, during WWI
- Operation Kadesh, an Israeli military operation in the Sinai Peninsula during the Suez Crisis in 1956
- Operation Sinai (2012), an ongoing Egyptian military campaign, launched since early August 2012, against Islamic militants within the Sinai Peninsula to crush the Sinai Insurgency
- Comprehensive Operation – Sinai 2018, code name of a large counter-terrorism campaign conducted by the Egyptian Armed Forces and the Interior Ministry
