= Mohamad Riad El-Ghonemy =

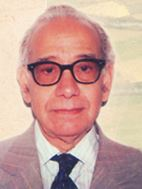

Developmental Economist Senior United Nations Civil Servant

Personal details
- Born: Delingat, Egypt
- Children: 3
- Education: PhD, agricultural economics, North Carolina State University, Raleigh
- Occupation: Economist, academic

M. Riad El-Ghonemy (January 24, 1923 - February 4, 2019) was an author and development economist from Egypt. El-Ghonemy was born in Delingat, Egypt, a village in the Nile Delta region. El-Ghonemy's career spanned six decades, with educational roots that began by earning a scholarship for post secondary education in the United States, where he completed a PhD in agricultural economics.

El-Ghonemy then worked with the Food and Agriculture Organization (FAO) of the United Nations for 28 years. In his work at FAO, El-Ghonemy developed policies and programs to assist farmers and societies with food shortages worldwide, helping millions achieve a better standard of living.

His work asserted that land reform can play a major part in stimulating the rural economy, particularly in providing the rural population with a greater command over their own food supply. Without further changes in the agricultural infrastructure and in the non-farm activities of an under-developed region, however, it can be less effective.

His writings concentrated on providing evidence on persistent rural poverty, hunger, and increased inequality in developing countries. El-Ghonemy was an elected Honorary Lifetime Associate at the Department of International Development at the University of Oxford. He was also Professor Emeritus at the College of Agriculture at Ain Shams University, in Cairo. He was married for 57 years to Marianne Ruth Snell (September 23, 1928 – July 16, 2016). El-Ghonemy died on February 4, 2019, in Cairo, Egypt at the age of 96.
