= September 11, 2017 Sinai ambush =

- Part of the Sinai Insurgency
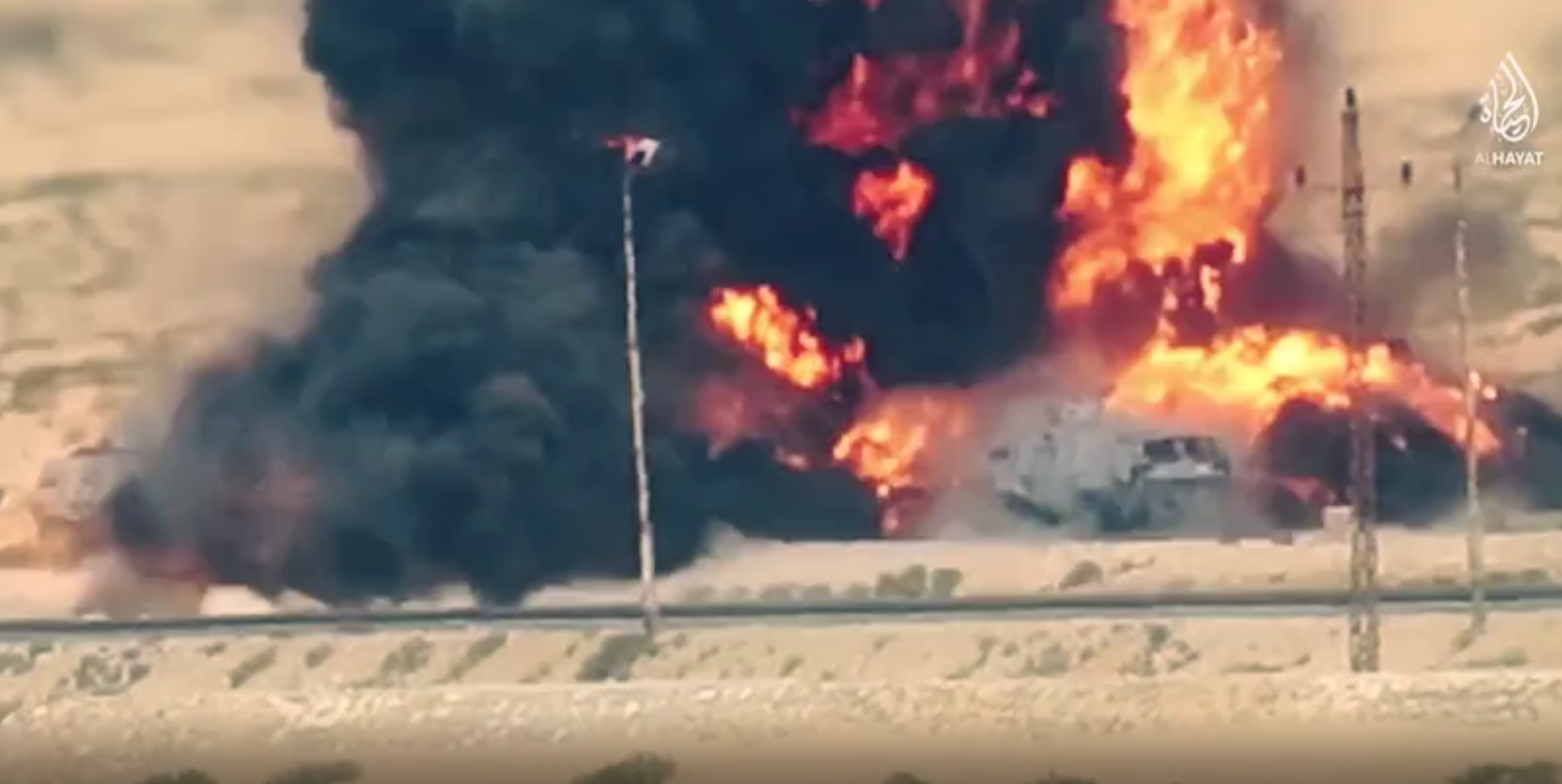
- A photo from the Ambush, as seen in Flames of War 2 released by the Islamic State's Al-Hayat Media Center
Location	Western outskirts of El-Arish, North Sinai Governorate, Egypt 31°04′43″N 33°35′29″E
Result	Islamic State Victory

Belligerents
Islamic State	Egypt

Commanders and leaders
Unknown	Unknown

Units involved
Sinai Wilayah	Egyptian Armed Forces; Egyptian Army; Ministry of the Interior; Egyptian National Police

Strength
Unknown	30+ soldiers and police officers

Casualties and losses
1 (VBIED driver)	18 killed 11 wounded

The September 11, 2017 Sinai ambush was a coordinated ambush on a police convoy in the North Sinai Governorate of Egypt on September 11, 2017. The attack resulted in the deaths of at least 18 policemen and responsibility was claimed by the Sinai Wilayah of the Islamic State. It was one of the deadliest attacks against Egyptian security forces in 2017.

== Background ==
Since the 2013 Egyptian coup d'état, the Sinai Peninsula has seen an escalation in an insurgency led by militant groups, most notably the Sinai Wilayah of the Islamic State. The group had previously carried out several high-profile attacks, including the July 2017 Rafah attack which killed 23 soldiers.

== Ambush ==
On the morning of September 11, 2017, a police convoy consisting of four Fahd APCs was traveling on a road approximately 30 kilometers (19 miles) west of the coastal city of El-Arish.

The attack began with a suicide vehicle that targeted the convoy. The blasts destroyed and set fire to four armored vehicles and a fifth vehicle equipped with signal-jamming technology.

Following the initial blasts, gunmen in the surrounding desert opened fire on the survivors with machine guns. The militants commandeered a police pickup truck before fleeing the scene.

== Responsibility ==
Sinai Wilayah claimed responsibility for the attack via the Amaq News Agency, showing aftermath photos of the ambush. Later, in November 2017, the Al-Hayat Media Center of the Islamic State released a 58 minute long video titled "Flames of War 2", in this video, a clip of the September 2017 ambush is seen.
