= Ahmed Mansi =

Egyptian SEAL military commander (1978–2017)

- Born: Ahmad Saber Muhammad 'Ali Mansy; October 4, 1978; Minya al-Qamh, al-Sharqiyya Governorate
- Died: July 7, 2017 (aged 38); Rafah, North Sinai Governorate
- Education: Egyptian Military Academy
- Spouse: Manar Selim
- Military career
- Allegiance: Egypt
- Branch: Egyptian Army
- Rank: Colonel, Military staff
- Nickname: The Legend
- Unit: Unit 999 / SEALs
- Conflicts: Rafah Terror Attack

Colonel Ahmed Mansy (Arabic: أحمد منسي; October 4, 1978 – July 7, 2017) was the commander of Egypt's Sa'ka Forces (Special Forces) Thunderbolt Battalion 103.

== Life ==
He was born in 1978 in Minya al-Qamh district in al-Sharqiyya governorate. He joined the Sa'ka Forces in the Nineties, immediately after his graduation from the Egyptian Military Academy in 1998. He had served for a long time in the Special Forces Task Force Unit 999, which is the most powerful unit in Egypt's Thunderbolt Forces. In 2001, he joined the first Egyptian SEAL Team training and then he was selected to travel to the United States of America to join the United States Navy SEALs Basic Underwater Demolition/SEAL (BUD/S) Class 258 in 2006.

Mansy obtained a master's degree in military science from the Command and Staff College, and he took over as commander of the 103rd Sa'ka (Thunderbolt) Forces Battalion in Sinai after the death of the battalion's former commander, Colonel Rami Hassanein, in October 2016.

In 2016, he was awarded by the battalion during the month of Ramadan for his excellent performance and his military discipline.

== Depiction in media ==
Actor Amir Karara played the biography of Colonel Ahmed Mansy in TV series titled "The Choice", which premiered in Ramadan 2020. The series has been a success in the Egyptian and Arab street, since its introduction at the beginning of the month of Ramadan 2020, and its events revolve around the death of the hero of the Egyptian armed forces, Colonel Ahmed Mansy.

The events also cover the life of the terrorist Hesham Ashmawy, an infamous former fellow officer who masterminded several terror attacks in Egypt before and after his escape to Libya, where he was eventually captured, returned to Egypt and sentenced to death.

== Death ==
He was killed in action with several other members of his battalion on Friday, July 7, 2017, in a violent terrorist attack on an ambush in North Sinai's al-Barth village located between the border town of Rafah and Sheikh Zuweid town during the clashes between Egyptian Armed Forces and Islamist militants affiliated to ISIS.

According to the Egyptian army spokesperson Tamer el-Rifa'i, the army besieged groups of terrorists and foiled attacks that targeted a number of other checkpoints in the Rafah area in North Sinai.

The ambush got encircled by 13 armed vehicles carrying 100 Takfiris (terrorists who claim others are unbelievers). The outcome of the battle that lasted for hours was the killing of 46 takfiris and the destruction of six vehicles. Yet, 5 officers and 15 soldiers at the ambush were killed in action, including Colonel Mansi.

=== Funeral and honour ===
Actor Mohamed Ramadan attended his funeral; he said that it was a funeral of a hero who knows the real meaning of being an Egyptian. He said that he met Colonel Mansy twice during his enlistment in the Egyptian Armed Forces.

Mansi and Ashmawi are both human beings and army officers who shared the same unit in the Armed Forces. We look up to the former with pride and gratitude, while we look to hold the latter one accountable for his crimes. The simple difference between Ashmawi and Mansi is that the former may have been confused or even a traitor, while the latter maintained the correct path, sacrificing his life to protect his country and people.

— President Abdel Fattah el-Sisi

President Abdel Fattah el-Sisi inaugurated a floating bridge called "Martyr Ahmed Mansy" connecting the Eastern and Western shores of the Suez Canal in Zone 6 in the Ismailia Governorate, achieving integration with ferries and undersea tunnels.

el-Sisi also drew a comparison between Colonel Ahmed Mansy and Hesham Ashmawi, and said there is a huge difference between Mansy and Ashmawy, stressing that both were officers of the same Army Special Forces unit, but one of them chose to betray the country, while the other remained loyal.

== See also ==
- Rafah terror attack
- Sinai terror attacks
- Hesham Ashmawy
- 2017 Sinai mosque attack
- Comprehensive Operation – Sinai 2018
- Refuting ISIS
- Defeating ISIS
