= TWA Flight 903 =

1950 aviation accident

Coordinates: 30°35′N 30°20′E

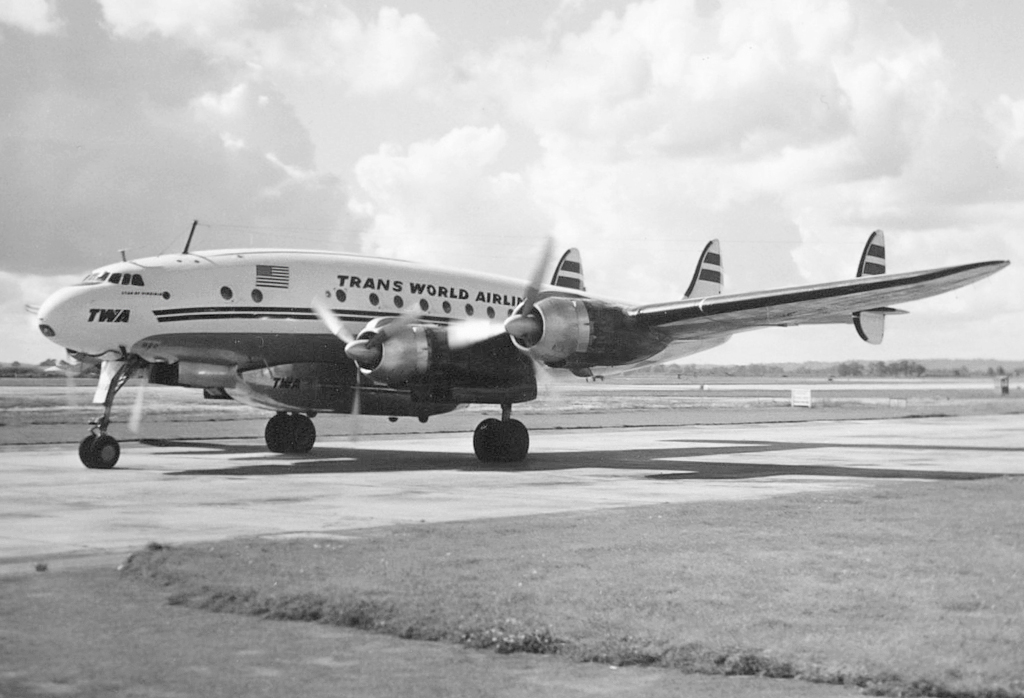
- A TWA L-749A Constellation similar to the accident aircraft

Accident
- Date: August 31, 1950
- Summary: Forced landing due to catastrophic engine failure and fire
- Site: Itay El Barud, Egypt

Aircraft
- Aircraft type: Lockheed L-749A Constellation
- Aircraft name: Star of Maryland
- Operator: Trans World Airlines
- Registration: N6004C
- Flight origin: Bombay International Airport, India
- 1st stopover: Cairo-King Farouk Airport
- 2nd stopover: Rome–Ciampino Airport
- Destination: New York-Idlewild Airport
- Occupants: 55
- Passengers: 48
- Crew: 7
- Fatalities: 55
- Survivors: 0

TWA Flight 903 was a regularly scheduled flight from Bombay International Airport, India to New York-Idlewild Airport, via Cairo-King Farouk Airport and Rome-Ciampino Airport. On 31 August 1950, the flight crashed in Egypt due to engine failure.

== Background ==
=== Aircraft ===
The aircraft involved was a Lockheed L-749A Constellation, called The Star of Maryland, registered as N6004C. It had 1,100 flight hours at the time of the crash.

=== Flight crew ===
Captain Walton Webb, 45, had been employed by TWA since July 1, 1940. He had 10,664 flight hours, 822 of which were on the Lockheed L-749 Constellation.

First Officer Halden Hammitt, 34, had been employed by TWA since September 12, 1945. He had 6,355 flight hours, 307 of which were on the Lockheed L-749 Constellation.

The other crew members were Navigator Harley Hackett, Flight Engineer Melvin House, Radio Operator Herbert Stiles, Purser Jose Bernard, and Stewardess Jeanne Lorenzi.

== Flight ==
The aircraft departed Cairo at 23:35 for Rome with 55 persons aboard, (48 passengers and seven crew members), in good weather.

As Flight 903 was climbing at 10,000 ft (3,000 m), the crew reported that its number three engine was on fire and that they needed a priority return to Cairo. As the plane was returning to Cairo, the engine separated from the aircraft, forcing the crew to attempt a forced landing in the desert about 65 mi (105 km) NNW of Cairo. The airliner went down near the village of Itay El Barud at the rim of the Western Desert, killing all 55 on board.

Searchers found the wreckage strewn over 500 yd (460 m) after trekking 15 mi (24 km) over hot sands to reach it, where the aircraft wreckage was found almost completely burnt out. The bodies of the victims were badly charred, delaying identification. A United Press International correspondent reported that the plane had smashed into a narrow-gauge railway in hitting the ground and had plowed up a considerable stretch of track.

Among those killed were Egyptian film star Camelia; Polish architect Maciej Nowicki, who had been working on the design of the new city of Chandigarh; and Indian mathematician S. S. Pillai, who was on his way to participate in the International Congress of Mathematicians at Harvard University.

== Investigation ==
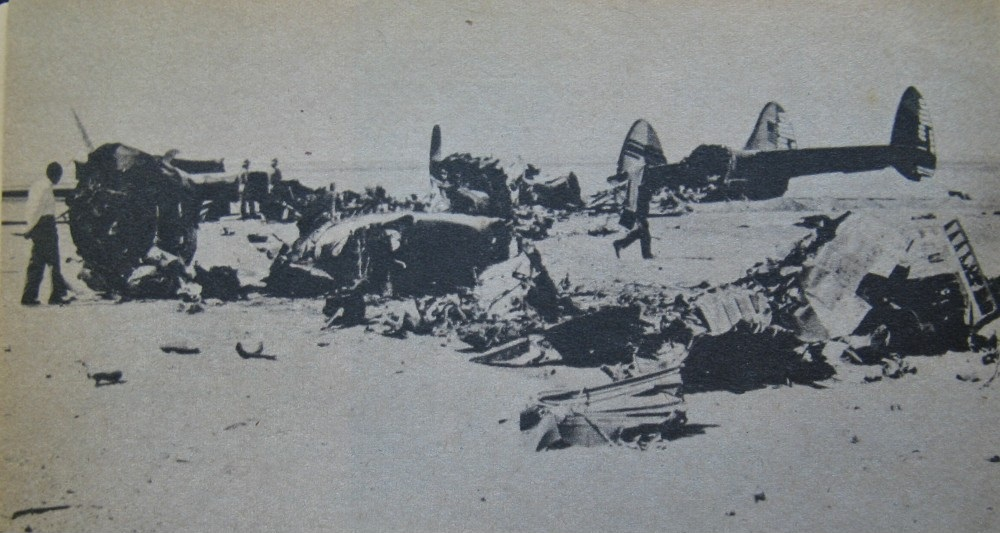
Remains of the aircraft

After an intensive investigation, the probable cause of the crash was cited to be failure of the rear master rod bearing on the number three engine. The failure caused the rear crankpin to overheat and fail, whereupon all the rear connecting rods failed, tearing through the cylinder walls and crankcase. In the process, oil lines were torn open, which caused the fire. Sludge buildup in the crankpins, blocking oil flow was thought to be the root cause, which resulted in improved oil screens and the implementation of a crankpin plug, as well as revised oil change intervals.
