= Non-U.S. operators of the M60 tank =

American tank M60 operated by foreign countries

There are several non U.S. nations that operate or used the M60 Main Battle Tank. The M60 tank entered service with the U.S. military in 1960 and served until 1991 and as a training aid until 2005. During this time it was the primary tank of the U.S. Army and U.S. Marine Corps.

The M60 tank was exported to 26 other nations, and continues to serve in a military role in some parts of the world.

== Argentina ==
In the early 1970s, the Argentine Government acquired a single M60A1 for evaluation for possible service with the Argentine military under the terms of the Conte-Long Amendment to the Foreign Assistance and Related Appropriations Act of 1968. However, in 1973 relations between the two countries began to deteriorate. 1975's Operativo Independencia and the 1976 Argentine coup d'état ended further military assistance. That sole M60A1 was never placed into service and stands as a gate guard outside the General Lemos Combat Support School at Campo de Mayo, near Buenos Aires.

== Austria ==
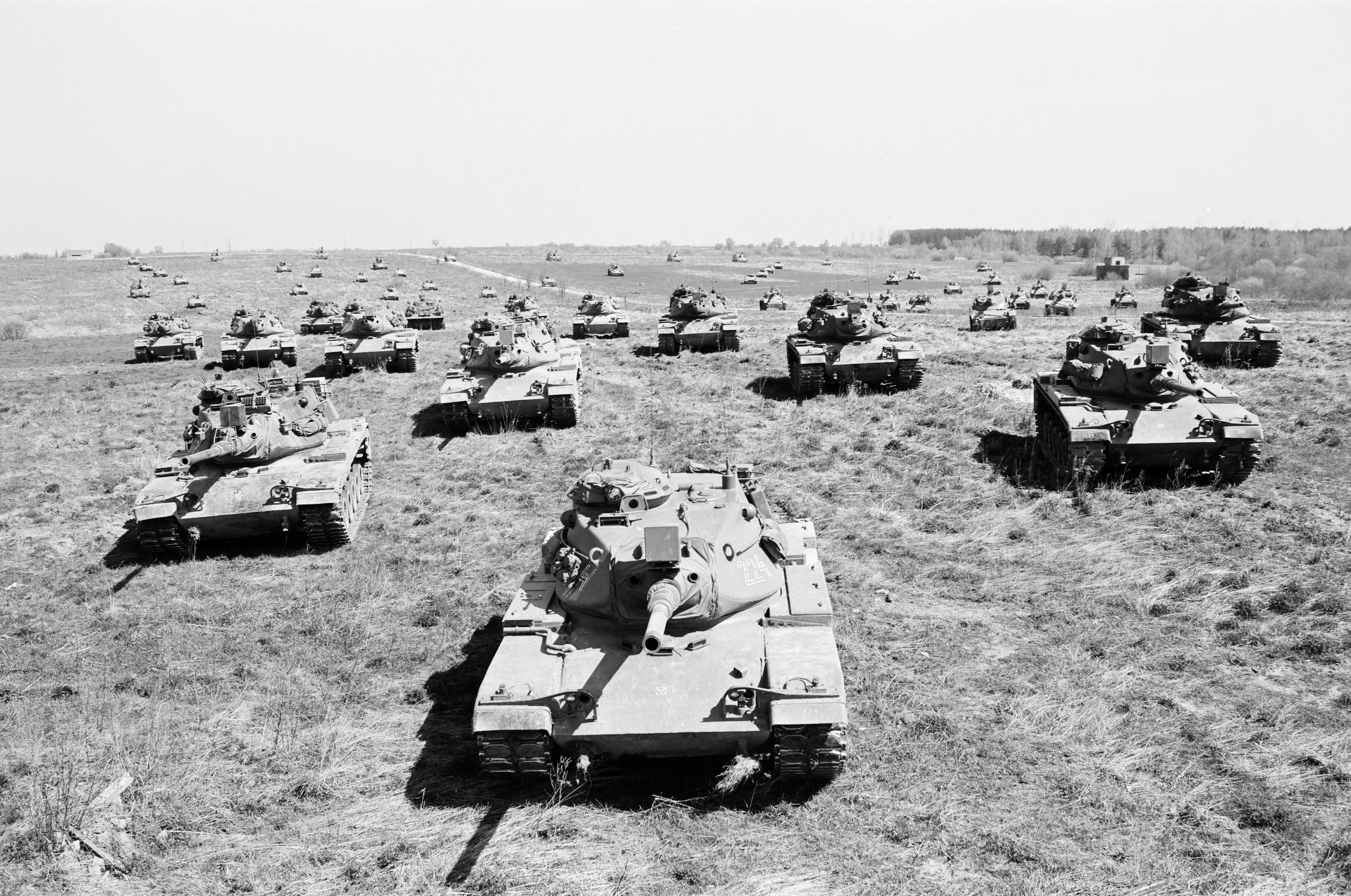
M60 of 3. Jägerbrigade, 1987.

The Austrian government purchased 170 M60A1s in Europe during the early 1980s from redundant USAEUR inventories, replacing the M41s and M47s in its Panzergrenadier (Mechanized) Brigades. Under its Everlasting Neutrality policies Austria avoided becoming a member of either NATO or the Warsaw Pact during the Cold War. Its relations with NATO were limited to the Partnership for Peace Program. They have generally limited their military to the protection of Austria and participation in various United Nations missions. In 1995, they began the restructuring of its forces and phased out the M60A1 from Austrian service replacing them with Leopard 2A4s acquired from surplus Dutch stocks. They sold their remaining M60s to Egypt.

== Bahrain ==
The Bahraini government has purchased 126 excess M60A3s from US Forces Korea and redundant stocks at Fort Knox in 1990. These tanks participated as part of Joint Forces Command East during the Gulf War. After the war, Bahrain received additional military support from the United States, including the sale of 54 M60A3 tanks, 12 F-16C/D aircraft, and 14 Cobra helicopters. Currently they have some 60 M60A3s in service and the rest in reserve. These tanks have had upgrades to their fire control and situational awareness systems by Leonardo DRS and Carat Defense Up-Armor spaced armor kits.

== Bosnia and Herzegovina ==
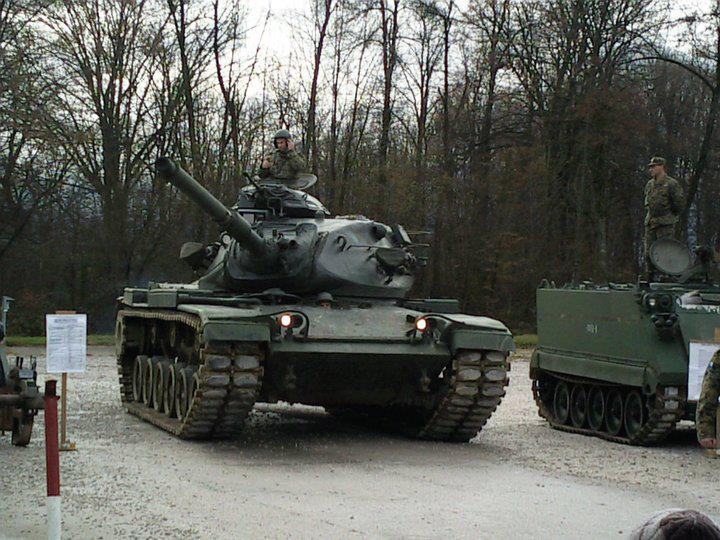
A Bosnian M60A3 TTS type tank

Bosnia and Herzegovina received its 45 M60A3s in 1996 as part of a United States Train and Equip Program.

== Brazil ==
Brazil acquired their first Main Battle Tanks (MBT)s, M60A3 TTS and Leopard 1A1s, respectively from the United States and Belgium, replacing almost at once all the already obsolete M41Cs. By 1997, Brazil purchased 128 Belgian Leopard 1s and 91 M60A3TTS, the last of which were delivered in 1999. Brazilian Army strategic priority projects are aimed to reequip its army brigades with equipment according to their growing needs. The projects would be implemented by 2035 and the total estimated value is R$60 billion (US$34 billion).

Brazil's Army's Modernization Program includes the modernization and revitalization of M60 combat vehicles, Leopard 1A1 and M113 armored vehicles. The projects would be implemented by 2035 and the total estimated value is R$60 billion (US$34 billion). With the Leopard 1A5 BR program, the EB had planned to standardize its fleet of tanks (CC) with German Leopard 1 as the new Leopard 1A5 would equip Vehicles Combat Regiments (RCC).

The Leopard 1BE (known as the EB Leopard 1A1), would be transferred to the RCB and the M60A3 TTS would be written off. However, due to the rapid obsolescence and ineffectiveness of Leopard 1BE, whose operation has been restricted to a few dozen vehicles, there were not enough to equip four RCBs, the plans had to be changed. The solution was to keep 28 M60A3 TTS in service with the 20th RCB and equip the three Southern RCBs with 36 Leopard 1BE (12 for each).

== Egypt ==
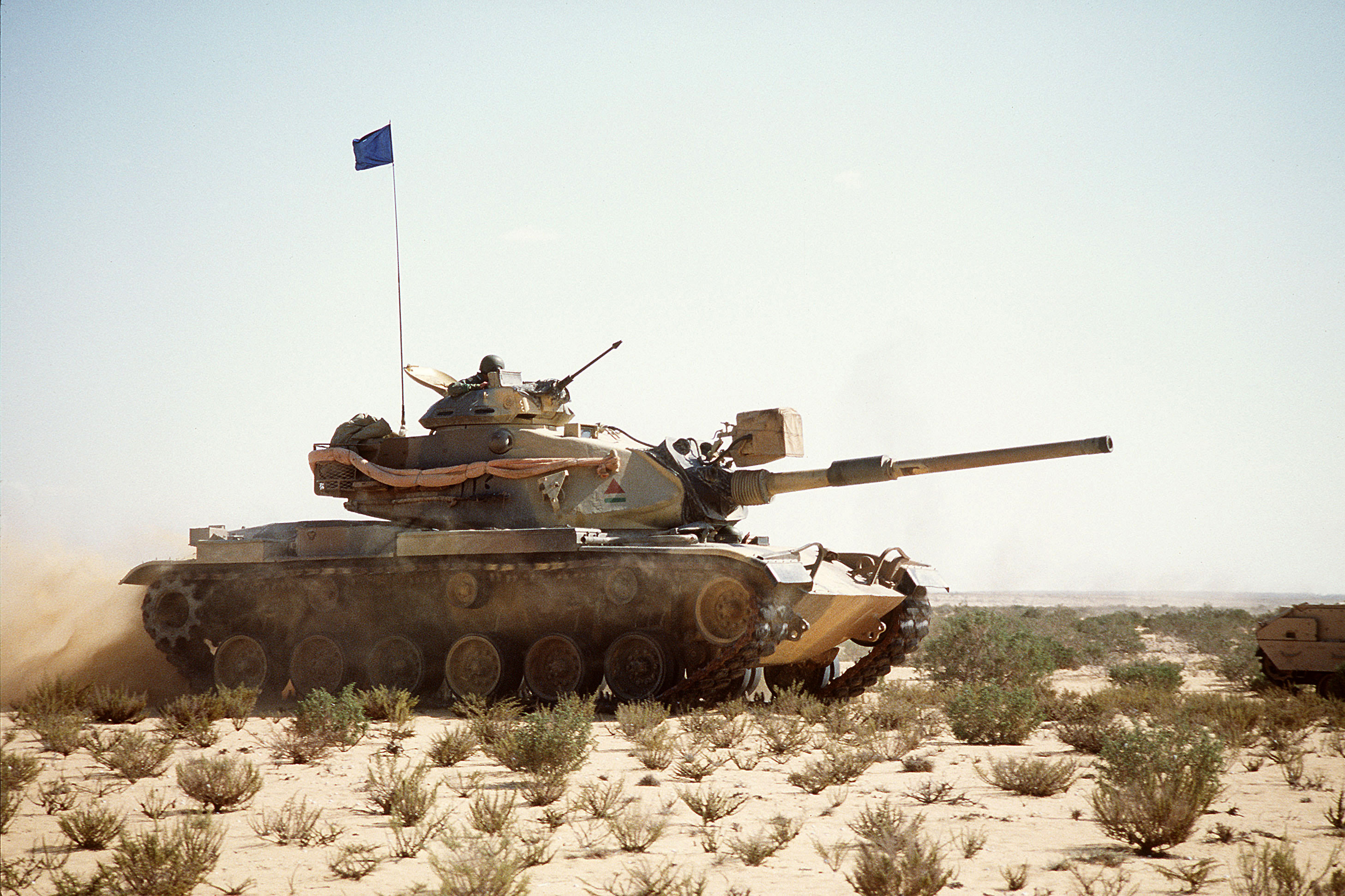
Egyptian version of the M60A1 participates with the Egyptian Army in Operation Bright Star.

Egypt steadily purchased 700 M60A1s from US surpluses in Europe from 1979 to 1988. Some additional 1,016 M60A3s were purchased from the United States and Austria between 1990 and 2002. Egypt had contracted with General Dynamics Land Systems to convert 400 M60A1s to the M60A3 standard during the 1990s. Egypt has employed its M60A1s and A3s in participation of semi-annual Bright Star exercises.

Egypt's military is currently engaged in the ongoing Sinai insurgency and has stationed troop and armor assets to the Sinai and Gaza border in early 2018 to quell Islamist terrorist activity and destroying many of the tunnels used by Hamas to bring supplies into Gaza. According to the Egypt Defense Portal, the vehicles, which included YPR-765 armored infantry fighting vehicles and 30 M60A3 main battle tanks, were stationed near Gaza in preparation for an expanded military campaign in the framework of Comprehensive Operation – Sinai 2018, which began last February.

The militant group Sinai Province claimed responsibility for an attack on an army-owned M60 tank in October 2018 in the northern Sinai. The group posted pictures of the attack on Twitter accounts allegedly operated by Sinai Province members, claiming that they planted an improvised explosive device (IED) on a side road linking the neighboring cities of Al-Arish and Sheikh Zuweid, which exploded while the tank was passing destroying the vehicle and left an Egyptian officer dead and four infantrymen injured. Egypt has been awarded a contract to assemble M1 Abrams tanks under license in Egypt with the goal of retiring M60s from Egyptian service.

== Ethiopia ==
Ethiopia acquired its M60 tanks from 1974 through 1977, as part of the longstanding 1953 United States–Ethiopian Mutual Defense Assistance Agreement. Citing the arms imbalance in the region resulting from Soviet aid to Somalia, Washington proposed to update Ethiopia's arms inventory over a three-year period by turning over $200 million worth of surplus materiel including M60A1s originally designated for the Republic of Vietnam. The United States also informed the Ethiopian Derg in February that it intended to reduce the size of the United States military mission and to close the Kagnew Communications Station, where activities already were being phased out, by the end of September 1977.

The Ethiopian government, believing that all United States military assistance eventually would be eliminated, responded in April 1977 by closing United States military installations and giving Military Assistance Advisory Group (MAAG) personnel a week's notice to leave the country. A large store of equipment remained behind in the rapid American departure. Ethiopia then ended the 1953 United States–Ethiopian Mutual Defense Assistance Agreement and terminated the lease on Kagnew station.

Without a bilateral agreement, the United States had no legal basis for the continued delivery of aircraft, armored vehicles, ships, and a number of air-to-surface and air-to-air missiles that had been approved for delivery and on which the Derg had made partial down payment. This ended the military relationship between the two nations.

They participated in the 1977-8 Ogaden War with Somalia. At least two Ethiopian M60A1 tanks were lost in the fighting near the city of Hargeisa during the defense of Dire Dawa in August 1977. Without further US support, the service life of M60s in the Ethiopian Army was brief with very few of them still operational at the conclusion of the war. They were replaced with T-72s supplied by East Germany.

== Greece ==
Greece received shipments of M60A1s from excess American stocks in Europe. United States transferred to Greece in 1992 and 1993 some 358 M60A1 and 312 M60A3 tanks, due to the restraints placed by the Treaty on Conventional Armed Forces in Europe and the general upgrading of armor assets by the United States through the 1990s, replacing the M47s and M48s.

Greece offered to donate 13 M60A3 tanks to Afghanistan in 2007. At least 312 M60A3 were in active service in 2009. They planned for their M60s tanks to be scrapped, sold or retired, with Leopard tanks replacing them and to conform to the CFE limit restrictions of the total number of tanks in service.

Greece did donate at least 13 M60A3 in 2009 tanks to help bolster Afghan tank platoons and may increase this number to almost 50 additional tanks. At least 350 M60 tanks of the Greek Army were offered as a donation to Iraq but not accepted. Greece attempted to acquire some 170 Leopard 2 MBTs in 2010 built by the German concern Krauss-Maffei Wegmann. This deal was not completed due to allegations of bribery. In 2011, Greece then was interested in buying M1 Abrams tanks from US stocks as replacements for its M60s. However, the deal was cancelled because Greece lacked adequate funding.

In April 2012, Greece accepted a donation offer from the U.S. for some 400 used M1A1 tanks and 700 M113s from redundant US Army inventory with the goal of modernizing its forces. Transportation costs were to be privately funded so as not to impact the Greek budget. M60s are no longer in Greek service as of 2015 and are being scrapped. Greek forces continue to use a small number of M48A5 MOLFs in the Aegean islands.

== Iran ==
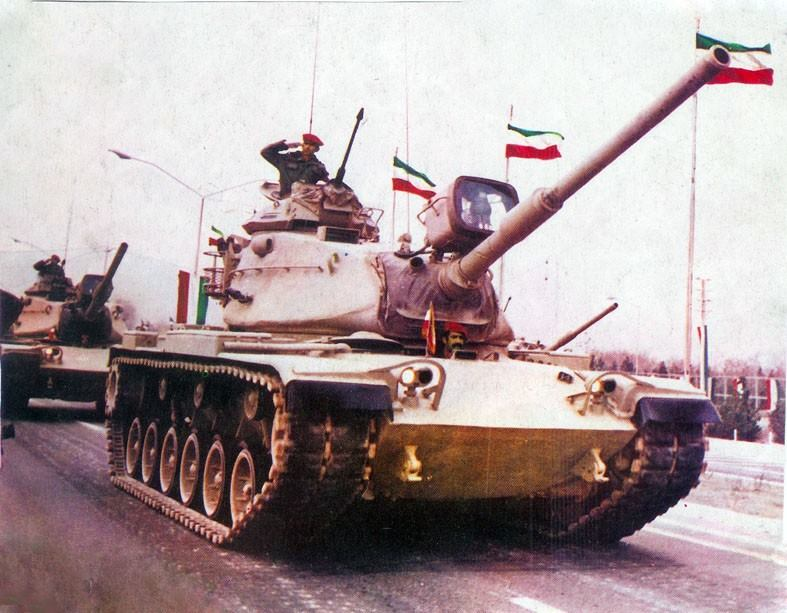
Imperial Iranian Ground Forces M60A1 during the parade in 1974.

Extensive numbers of M47, M48 and M60 tanks served within the Iranian military during the Iran–Iraq War, with varying combat success during the eight years of attrition and campaigning. According to Steven Zaloga, one of the first M60 tanks delivered to Iran was hijacked to the Soviet Union in 1961, and the information garnered allegedly led to the development of the T-62.

The United States provided the Shah's armies with access to American weaponry that included M60A1 tanks and F-14 fighter jets until 1979. These acquisitions were not backed with pressures for reforms. This was probably the driving force to the path of revolution in Iran.

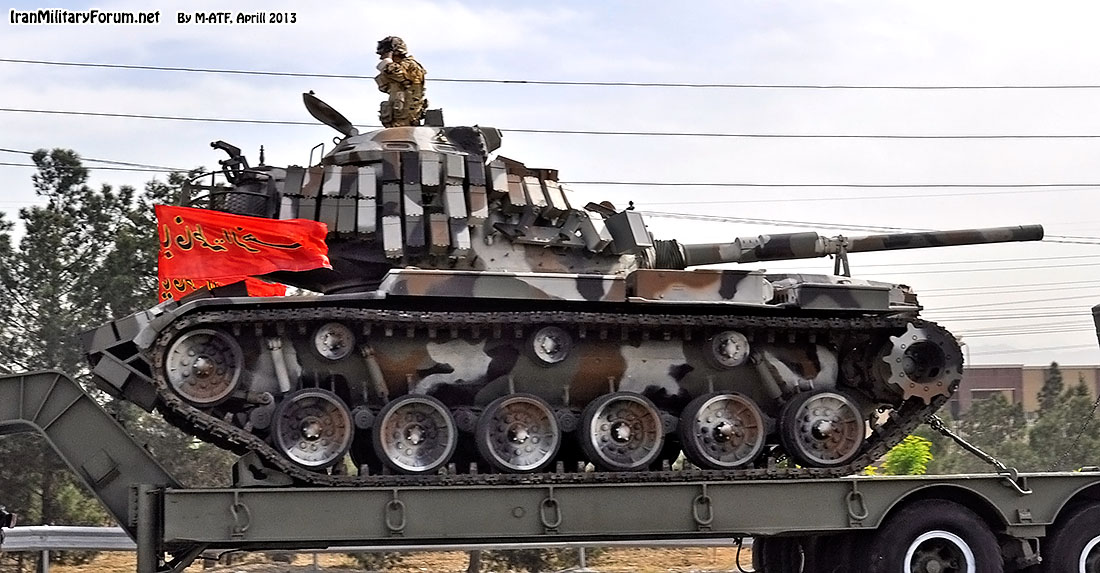
Iranian Army (NEZAJA) M60A1 Samsam, improved derivate of M60A1.

The Iran Hostage Crisis deprived Iran of all further American support. The reformed Iranian Army, backed by the Revolution's Guards inherited significant quantities of American tanks. These were integrated into the new Ground Forces (NEZAJA). As recently as 2010 Iranian armor divisions estimated fleet included 100 Chieftain Mk3 and Mk5 MBTs (referred to as the Mihr and Mobarez), 150 M60A1s, and 150 M47s and M48s. In the total, Iran lost over 300 of 455 initial M60s.

According to various sources, this was what remains of a peak of around 400 M47 tanks, 180 M48A5 (delivered post-1970), and 455 M60A1s (150 left after the Iran–Iraq War). These were all locally modernized, using new local names like the Zulfiqar or Samsam, but some of these seem to never pass the prototype stage, like the Sabalan.

== Iraq ==
During the Iran–Iraq War the Iraqi Army inflicted significant losses to Iran's armored forces. During the Battle of Khorramshahr in September 1980 six serviceable Iranian M60A1s were captured from Iran's 92nd Armored Division. They were transferred to Jordan. There are reports that some Iranian tanks of various types had been used ad hoc during the course of the war but none were officially in Iraqi service. Any still in their possession were destroyed after the war. Greece offered to donate 350 M60A3s in 2009 but the offer was not accepted.

== Israel ==
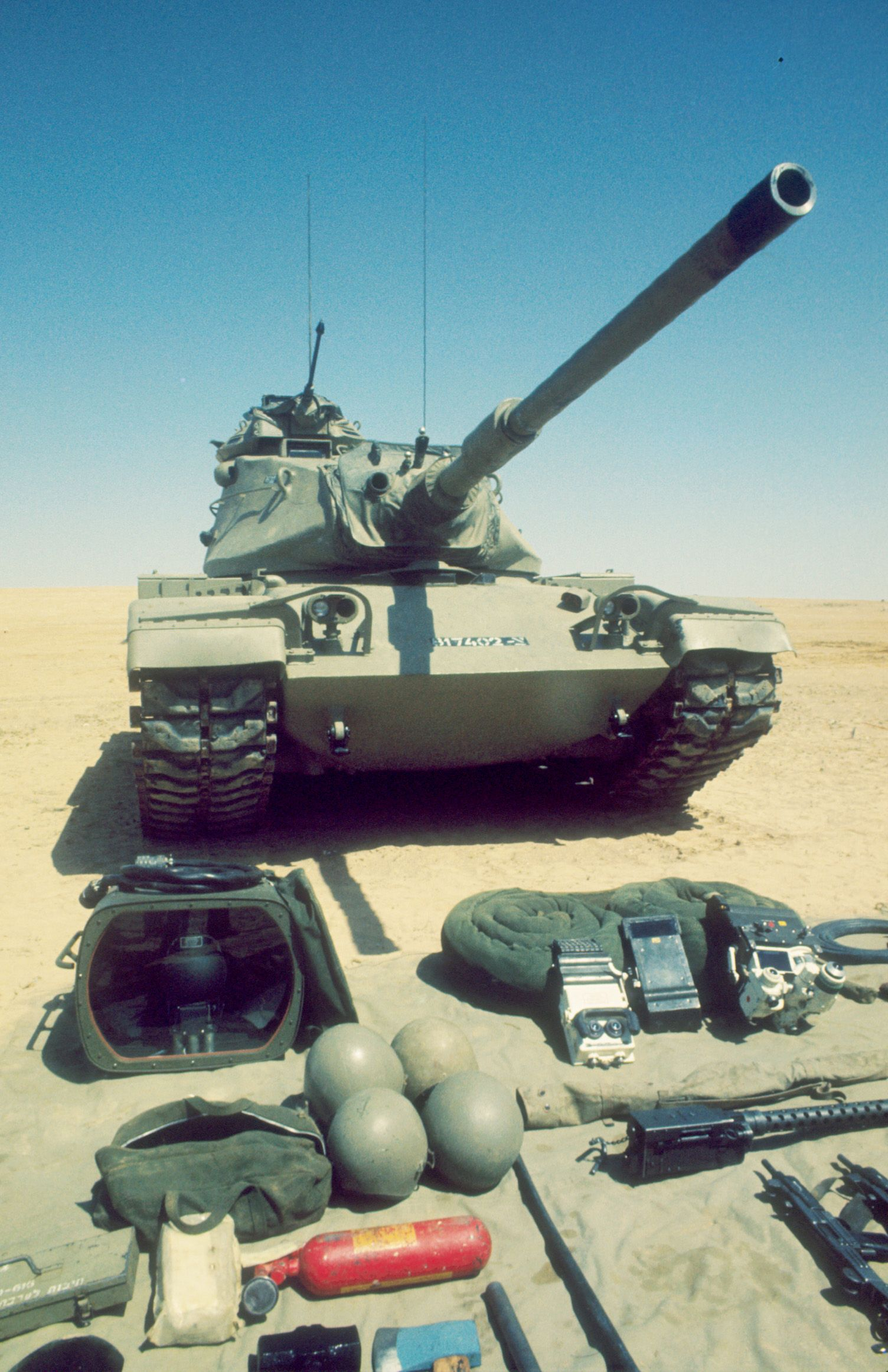
Israeli M60A1 (Magach 6) with additional equipment displayed in front of the vehicle.

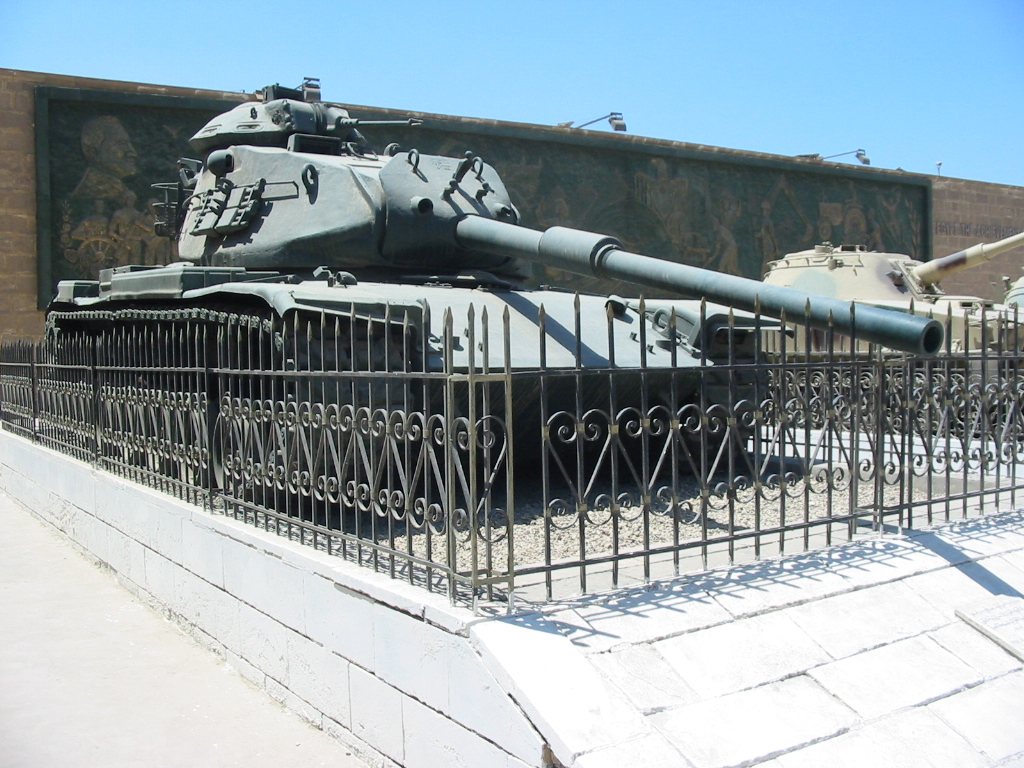
Israeli E60A Magach 6 tank captured by Egypt in 1973, with an E48 Magach 5 tank in background

They are referred to as the Magach in the Israeli military and as the E60 series by US Foreign Military Sales. The Israel Defense Forces (IDF) purchased its first M48s (Magach 3) tanks from West Germany in the late 1960s and its first (E60As Magach 6) from the United States in 1971. These E60A tanks served in their original (American) configuration but with the M19 cupola being replaced with the Urdan low profile cupola.

At the start of the Yom Kippur War, Israeli forces had a fleet of around 390 Magach 5s and 150 Magach 6s. They saw action in both the Sinai and the Golan Heights. The location of flammable hydraulic fluid at the front of the turret was exposed to be a severe design vulnerability. The United States executed Operation Nickel Grass to replace Israeli war losses with E60As thus triggering the 1973 Oil Crisis.

Prior to the 1982 Lebanon War, Israel fitted their Magach 6s providing them with Blazer explosive reactive armor (ERA). Israel upgraded its fleet of Magach 6s during the 1980s and 90s at the Israeli Military Industries TAAS Slavin Plant. In the 1990s Israel began to replace Magach 6s and 7s with the Merkava MBT. By 2006 all Magachs in regular units had been replaced by Merkavas although some Magach 7Cs are held in reserve storage.

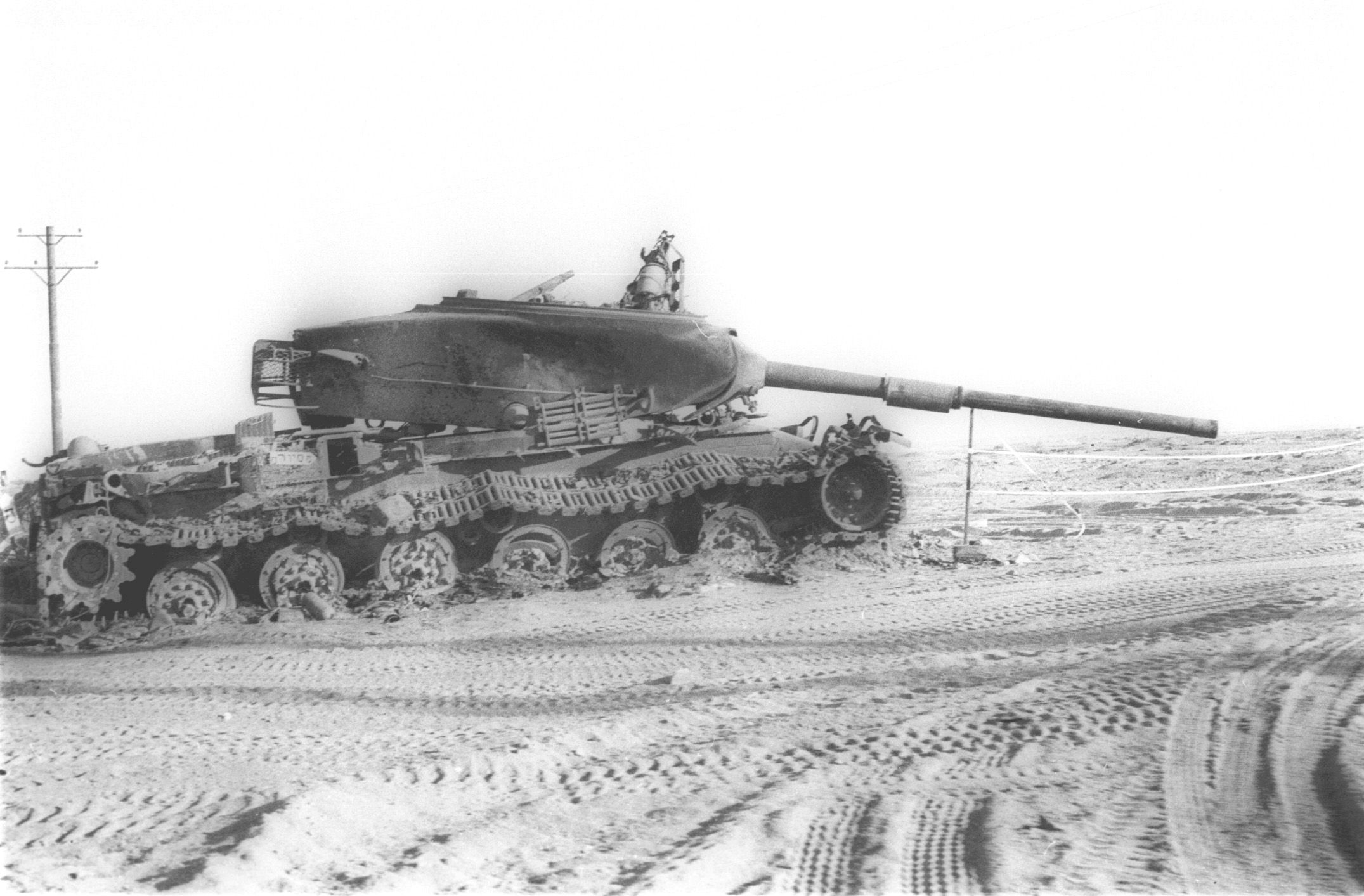
Israeli M60A1 lost to a catastrophic detonation during the incursion into Egypt in the later phase of the Yom Kippur War.

During the Battle of the Sinai (1973), the Egyptian Second and Third Armies breached the Bar-Lev Line on October 6. After Egyptian infantry had successfully crossed the canal and captured the Bar-Lev Line on October 6, Israeli forces made several counterattacks in attempts to push the Egyptians back across the Suez Canal.

The Israelis suffered heavy losses in these attacks, and by October 9 Egyptian forces in the Sinai had managed to destroy 500 Israeli tanks. The 3rd Egyptian Armored Division was eliminated and 120 Egyptian prisoners were taken in the battle at Wadi Mab'uk.

Following this both sides dug in. The Egyptians did not attack further for fear of extending their forces beyond the cover of their SAM defenses.

The 600th Israeli tank Brigade lost 92 of the 111 M60A1 tanks that were before the Yom Kippur war. The 87th Israeli reconnaissance tank Battalion lost 24 of the 24 M60A1 tanks

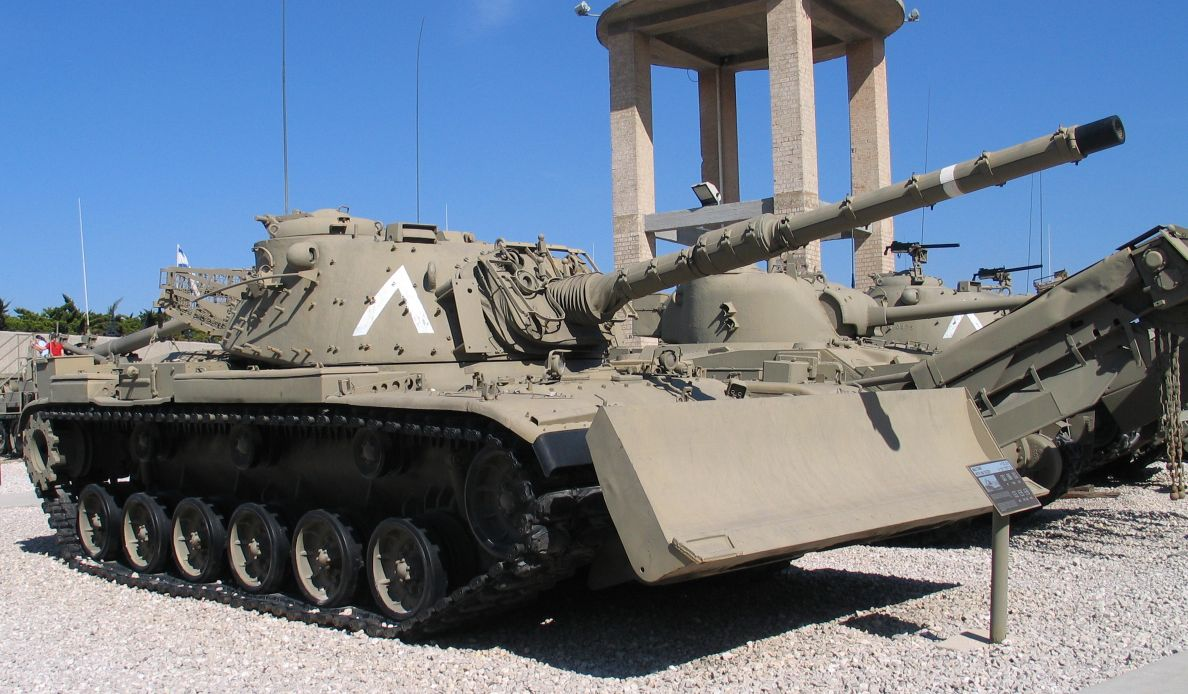
A E60 Magach 6 with M9 dozer blade in Yad la-Shiryon Museum, Israel

During Operation Peace in Galilee in 1982, Magach 6Bs encountered Syrian T-54/55 and T-72s as well as PLO T-34-85s. Israeli Magach 5s and 6Bs were engaged on 10–11 June 1982 in the battle of Sultan Yacoub, considered one of Israel's worst failures of the war suffering some 30 casualties, three taken prisoner and the loss of 11 tanks. Some were destroyed by Syrian infantry hunter-killer teams with ATGMs and supplemented by RPG-7s.

Several others were damaged by HOT missiles fired from Syrian Gazelle helicopters and one Magach 6B destroyed by a T-72. They failed to destroy the disabled M48A3 (Magagh 5) tanks left behind and they were recovered by Syrian forces the next day. One of the Israeli M48 Patton (Magach 5) tanks captured during the battle is now on display at the October War Panorama in Damascus, with another on display in the Kubinka Tank Museum in Russia.

In July 2013, Israel began the Teuza (boldness) program for turning some military bases into sales lots for obsolete IDF equipment. Older models not suited for Israel's forces are to be sold off, or sold for scrap if there are no buyers. The E60 and early model Magach tanks are among those being offered. Main buyers are expected from Latin American, Asian, and African countries.

With the disbanding of the last E60-equipped battalions in 2014, the M60/E60 series and Magach 6 series tanks are no longer in service with the Israel Defense Forces. They have been replaced with the Merkava MBT. However the M60 hull and chassis are still used for the Magach 7 tank and other vehicles. A small number of M60A1 (Tagesh) AVLBs are still in service with the IDF.

== Italy ==
Italy produced 200 M60A1s under license at the OTO Melara plant, and received 100 more from excess US stocks, for a total of 300 in the late 1970s to mid 1980s with the intent of replacing its M47s and M48s. The Italian Army used them Armoured Division Ariete with M60A1s until it was disbanded in October 1986. After the division's breakup they were used to equip the 32nd Armored Brigade (Mameli), 60th Armored Battalion (Pinerolo), 20th Tank Battalion (Pentimalli), 8th Tank Battalion (Secchiaroli), and 10th Tank Battalion (Bruno). They formed a part of NATO's Allied Forces Southern Europe northeastern sector to defend against a possible invasion from or through Yugoslavia.

The Italian Army has participated mainly as a part of a greater multinational force, either belonging to NATO, EU, or to a coalition that is formed to address a specific crisis. In 1982, a reinforced battle group (NRDC-IT) including M60 tanks deployed to Lebanon conducting Operations LIBANO 1 and LIBANO 2 in support of the UN's Multinational Force in Lebanon, which ended in March 1984.

With the end of the Cold War, the M60 was gradually phased out of service and replaced by the C1 Ariete main battle tank. They were completely out of Italian service by 2008. In 2017 Italian defense company Leonardo offered an upgrade of the M60 for foreign sales initially targeted for Bahrain.

== Jordan ==
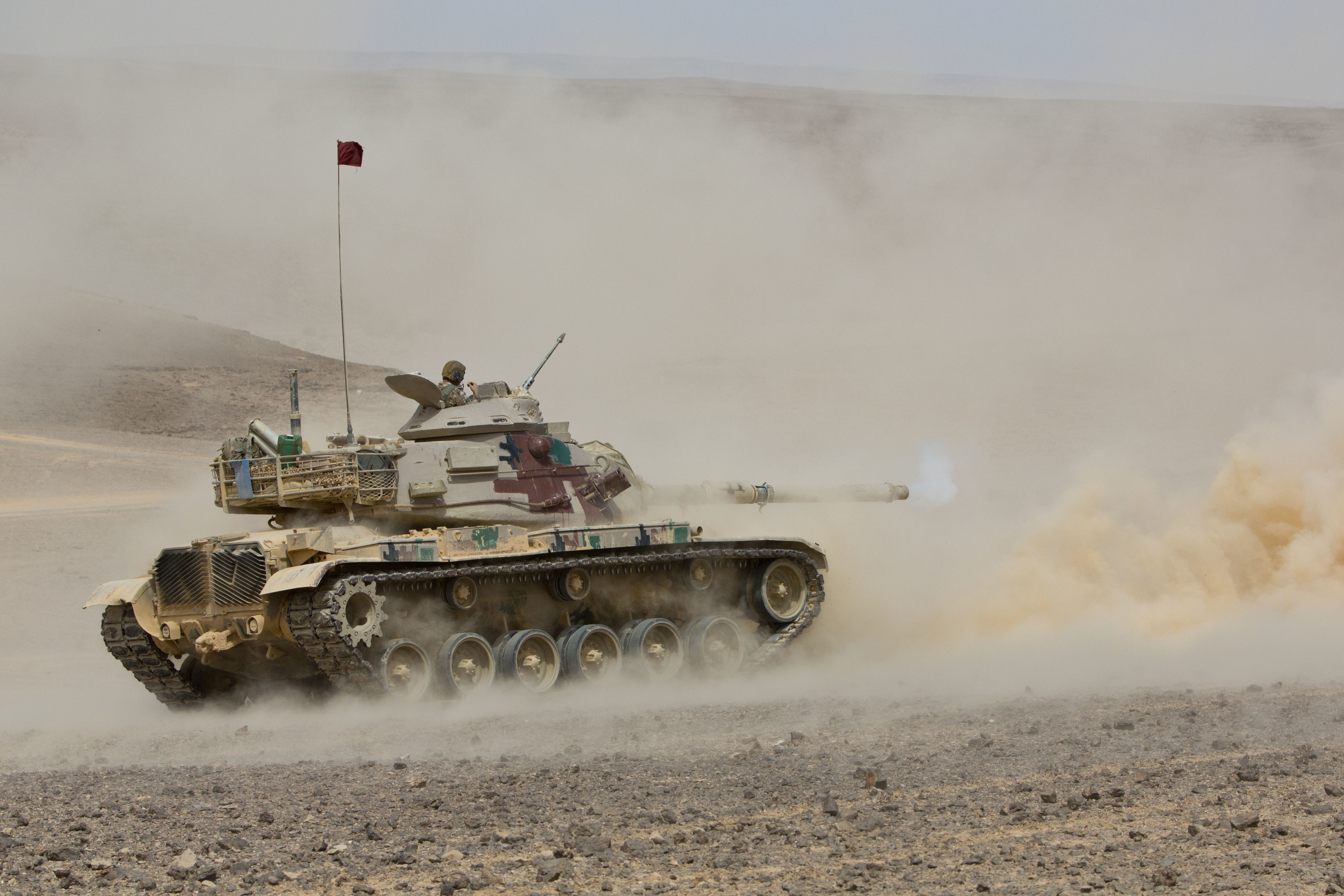
Jordanian M60A3 in 2015.

The United States has provided bilateral economic and military aid to Jordan since the 1951 U.S. aid (overseen by State and the Department of Defense) and under this context received its first M48s in 1965. 240 M60A3TTS were purchased from the United States after completing their service in the Army National Guard during the mid 1990s, the last of these were transferred in 1997. These A3 tanks formed the basis for the development of the M60 Phoenix MBT. They also have some 82 M60A1s currently in storage, with around 20 of these have been converted to the Al-Monjed A2 ARV by King Abdullah Design and Development Bureau (now Jordan Design and Development Bureau). Six M60A1s were captured by Iraq from Iran during the Iran–Iraq War and transferred by Saddam Hussein to Jordan in 1980.

The Royal Jordanian Army (RJA) has begun the restructuring its armored forces. Currently the RJA fields eight battalions of Main Battle Tanks, four of which are equipped with a total of 182 M60A3s converted to the M60 Phoenix standard. The other four battalions are equipped with Challenger 1 tanks, which were locally named the Al Hussein MBTs. Around 400 of these had been delivered by 2004, although it is unlikely that many are still in service. In May 2015, Kilo Company, 24th US Marines Expeditionary Unit M1A1 Main Battle Tanks and AAVs worked with Jordanian M60 Phoenix Main Battle Tanks and armored personnel carriers during Exercise Eager Lion in Jordan.

== Lebanon ==
The Lebanese Armed Forces (LAF) entered discussions with Jordan to acquire M60A3 MBTs in 2008 to replace its older M48s and T-55s. These transfers required approval under the US Third Party Transfer (TPT) from the US Central Command (USCETCOM). However Lebanon's leadership was apprehensive about a second transfer of 46 M60A3s because of its dissatisfaction with the first 10 tanks received from Jordan in May 2009. These tanks were rejected for service with the Lebanese military. The United Arab Emirates committed $17 million to pay for the transfers, but by the end of 2009 had not provided the funds and had not yet fully committed the $98 million to finance the remaining tanks, for a total of 56 tanks.

== Libya ==
Turkey transferred at least three M60A1 tanks in 2020 to support the Turkish-allied Government of National Accord (GNA) forces against the Khalifa Haftar's eastern-based Libyan National Army (LNA) in the ongoing Turkish military intervention in the Second Libyan Civil War. It is not known if these tanks are upgraded Sabra variants.

== Morocco ==
Morocco received its M60 tanks through transfers from the United States in 1981. They have been engaged in the protracted and inconclusive war over the Western Sahara region. In October 1981 Moroccan M60A1s engaged T-54 tanks operated by SADR guerrillas during fighting around Guelta Zemmur and Bir Anzaran. Morocco's M60A1 tanks were systematically upgraded to M60A3s as these became available in the mid 1990s. Morocco has been replacing M60s still in service with surplus US M1A1 Abrams MBTs through US Foreign Military Sales.

== Oman ==
The Royal Army of Oman also bought some 54 M60A3s tanks for its only tank battalion from the United States in the late 1980s and in 1990 acquired 39 more. One regiment was equipped with Challenger 2s and the other with M60s. The Omani armored battalion served in Saudi Arabia, as part of the GCC contribution to the ground war to liberate Kuwait. It formed part of the Saudi Arabian-led Task Force OMAR along with the Saudi 10th Mechanized Brigade. It advanced into Kuwait on the second day of the ground offensive and had no casualties.

In 2001, Oman M60s and a large contingent of the British Army, held Exercise Saif Sareea II. The stated aims of the exercise were to practice rapid deployment and test equipment in severe conditions. As of 2015 these 93 were still in service with some of these stored in reserve.

== Portugal ==
Portugal also received some 96 M60A3 tanks from redundant US Army inventory in Europe during 1991–92 as a result of the CFE Treaty. As of 2008, only 14 tanks were in the 1st Combat Squadron and the rest in reserve. Portugal's armed forces function under NATO obligation to equip the First Composite Brigade to be at the disposal of the Supreme Allied Commander Europe (SACEUR) and started taking part in NATO exercises in 1980.

== Saudi Arabia ==
The Royal Saudi Army has purchased around 910 M60A1RISE and RISE/Passive MBTs from the United States from the late 1970s through the mid 1980s. Some 186 of these were given to North Yemen. Many of the remaining A1s were upgraded to the A3 standard through 1994. In 1990 Saudi Arabia inspected and purchased 390 M60A3s from US redundant inventories at Ft. Hood. As of 2015 the Saudi fleet included some 660 M60A3s, with about half of this number in reserve.

They saw action as part of the Coalition Forces during the Gulf War, participating in the Battle of Khafji as well as in the Saudi Arabian-led intervention in Yemen. The Saudis deployed M60A3s under the aegis of the Gulf Cooperation Council's (GCC) joint Peninsula Shield Force crossing the King Fahd Causeway from Saudi Arabia to Bahrain in order to support the al-Khalifa security forces during the Bahraini protests in March 2011.

The Bahraini uprising was the first GCC deployment in relation to an internal threat and was followed by persistent claims by media channels about the GCC's forces strafing demonstrators with warplanes and destroying mosques. According to the Saudi commander al-Azima, stated that the role of the force in Bahrain was to "secure Bahrain's vital and strategically important military infrastructure from any foreign interference" and to protect Bahraini borders while Bahrain security forces are "preoccupied with Bahraini internal security". He denied that the force caused any Bahraini citizen to "suffer so much as a scratch", and said that the force entered Bahrain "to bring goodness, peace, and love".

Saudi armored forces have experienced losses during its 2015 campaign in Yemen. The losses included some 20 M1A2 Abrams and at least 22 M60A3s. Many of these were destroyed by Iranian and Soviet ATGMs. On April 8, 2018, a Saudi M60A3 tank was lost and seven soldiers killed during a skirmish in the Najran province along the Saudi-Yemeni border.

Over 50 M60 tanks were destroyed from 2015 to 2018. They have purchased some 800 surplus German Leopard 2 MBTs in 2012 for $12.5 billion to replace the M60s remaining in Saudi service. They have recently placed a US$500 million order for ammunition for their M60s and other equipment to replenish stocks expended during its military incursion into Yemen.

== Spain ==
Spain received some 400 M60A3 MBTs in 1991–92, when redundant American equipment became available as a result of the Conventional Forces in Europe (CFE) Treaty. The Ministry of Defense in 1995 under the Armor 2000 program has been replacing M60s in Spanish service with the Leopard 2 A5 MBT. Some have been converted into the M60CZ-10/25E Alacran and AVLBs. Many were transferred to Greece during the mid 1990s.

In 2024 the Spanish Ministry of Defense announced its decision to auction off a number of ex-Spanish Navy M60s. The Delegated Board of Disposals and Material Liquidator of the Arsenal of Cádiz is handling the sale of the tanks. The lot of tanks has a stated “base price” of €46,924.93, according to the official notice.

== Sudan ==
The United States and Sudan entered an agreement in November 1976 to provide Sudan with selected arms. The United States sold Sudan transport aircraft financed by Saudi Arabia, followed several years later by F-5 combat airplanes. Believing that Sudan was threatened by neighboring Ethiopian and Libyan forces heavily armed by the Soviet Union, Washington adopted a growing role in Sudan's security.

Between fiscal year 1979 and 1982, military sales credits rose from $5 million to $100 million. Subsequent aid was extended on a grant basis. United States aid consisted of M113 APCs, M60A1 tanks, artillery, and Commando armored cars. United States grant aid reached a peak of $101 million in 1982. At the time, this constituted two-thirds of all United States military assistance to sub-Saharan Africa.

Sudan granted the United States naval port facilities at Port Sudan and agreed to some prepositioning rights for military equipment for contingent use by the United States Central Command. Sudanese and United States forces participated in Operation Bright Star in 1981 and 1983. When civil war again erupted in the south in 1983, military grants and credits from the United States were abruptly stopped and in 1985 Sudan terminated its participation in Operation Bright Star.

After 1987, no assistance was extended with the exception of less than $1 million annually for advanced training for Sudanese officers and training in the maintenance of previously supplied equipment. The Sudanese 9th Armored Brigade has participated as a member of the Saudi-led coalition in Yemen.

As of 2014, the Sudanese Army had a jumbled fleet of 465 tanks including 20 M60A1s, 60 Type 59/Type 59D, 305 T-54/55, 70 T-72M1, and 10 Type 85-IIM and a recent purchase of 150 more T-72s.

== Taiwan ==
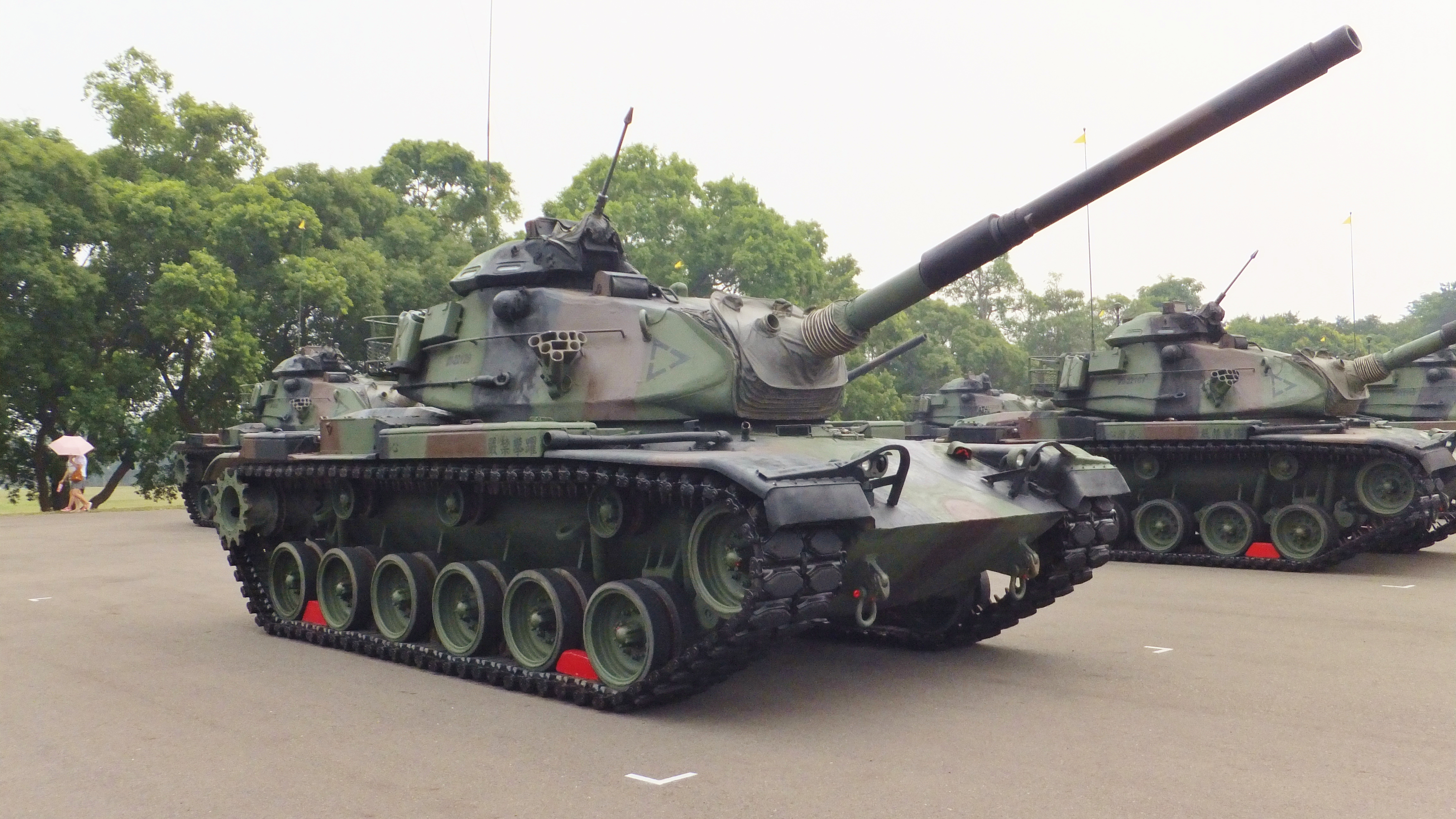
A M60A3 TTS of the Taiwanese army

Taiwan received its first shipments of M60A3TTS tanks from the United States under the terms of the 1954 Taiwan – United States Mutual Defense Treaty and the 1951 Mutual Security Act until 1979. Further military assistance has been provided under Export-Import Bank financing and Overseas Private Investment Corporation guarantees.

In August 1997, it was announced that the United States would transfer 180 surplus M60A3 tanks to Taiwan over the following 12 months in a deal worth about $1 million per vehicle. Taiwan is acquiring a total of 480 M60A3 tanks; they will join an already large tank force consisting of some 450 M48H and 300 M48A5 medium tanks and over 1,000 much older M41 and M24 light tanks (most of which are said to be in storage).

In October 2017, Taiwan abandoned attempts to acquire surplus M1 Abrams from the U.S. and announced an upgrade program for 450 of its M60A3s, consisting of replacing the main gun with a new 120 mm cannon, as well as upgrading the ballistics computer, changing turret hydraulics to electric, and other systems. Testing and evaluation are expected to be completed in 2019 and application of new features to start in 2020. In May 2018, Taiwan's Minister of National Defense told a legislative panel they are still interested in purchasing an initial batch of 108 U.S. surplus M1A2 Abrams tanks, enough to equip two battalions. In July 2019 the US State Department approved the sale of 108 M1A2Ts. The first two were delivered to Taiwan in June 2022.

Other than the M60A3 TTS, Taiwan also has approximately 400 CM11 Brave Tiger tanks developed by General Dynamics and the ROC Army's Armored Vehicle Development Center. The CM11 is a hybrid M60 chassis fitted with the turret from the older M48A5 Patton and the fire control system (FCS) of the M1 Abrams. Some analysts have expressed concerns that Taiwan's terrain and some of its bridges and roads are unsuitable for the M1A1's 60 ton weight.

== Thailand ==
They purchased some 53 M60A1RISE Passive and 125 M60A3TTSs from the United States after their service with the US Army between 1985 and 1990. Royal Thai Army M60A3s were engaged in combat to recapture Border Post 9631, some two miles west of the city of Thachilek, from Myanmar Army forces in 2001. On 10 February, the Thai 3rd Cavalry Regiment assembled a battalion-sized task force from a part of a mechanized infantry battalion armed with M113A3 APCs, an infantry company and a company of M60A3 MBTs and reportedly exchanged fire with Type 69 tanks.

In 2010, Thailand began processes to eventually replace its M60A3s. The exact number of MBTs that Royal Thai Army requires is unknown, although there have been reports that Thailand plans to purchase around 200 new MBTs for its armored formations over the next couple of years. In 2011, Thailand placed a $240 million order for the purchase of 49 Ukrainian-made T.84 Oplot-M MBTs plus a number of support vehicles with Ukrspetsexport, a Ukrainian state-owned defense contractor.

By the end of 2015, only ten tanks had been delivered to the Royal Thai Army, causing concern over future delays among high-ranking officers in the Royal Thai Army. Five additional tanks are slated for delivery in early 2016, according Ukrspetsexport, although it is possible that Bangkok might opt out of the contract due to the delays. Originally they were supposed to receive 20 T-84 tanks in 2015.

Thailand's defense minister, Prawit Wongsuwon, visited Russia in late February and inspected a T-90 (M)S model, whereas RTA chief, General Thirachai Nakwanich, visited China in January to inspect the Chinese VT-4 MBT model. A Thai delegation visited Russian main battle tank manufacturer Uralvagonzavod in late December 2015 and expressed interest in both the T-90S and the T-14 Armata MBT. Colonel Winthai Suvaree emphasized that the military will make a decision based on cost-effectiveness with no details as to when a selection will be made, or a price estimate.

== Tunisia ==
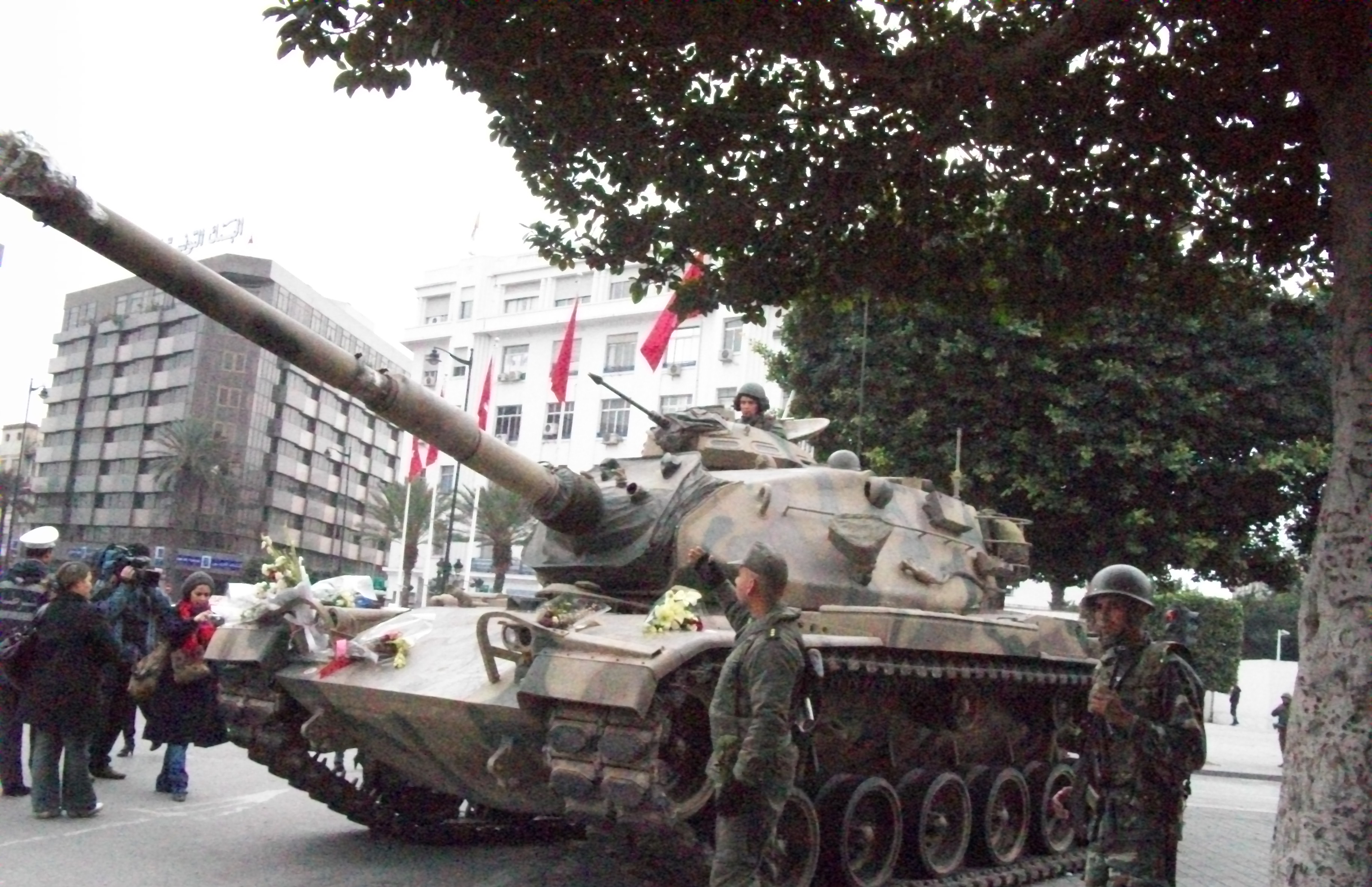
A Tunisian M60

The United States approved a $293 million arms aid package for Tunisia in 1982 that included F-5 fighter jets and M60 tanks after the Gafsa incident in 1980 and to counteract possible Libyan aggression. Deliveries were delayed by Tunisian difficulties in finding financing. Tunisia took delivery of its M60A3s during 1984–5. As of 2011 they were still in service.

In July 2014, Tunisian and Algerian armies agreed to launch a series of parallel military operations along the border areas as part of a long-term security plan to eliminate terrorist groups from the region. The operations will target the Kasserine Governorate in Tunisia and the border areas linking the south-west of Libya with southern Tunisia as well as areas of the governorates of Wadi, Tebessa and Biskra in Tunisia and Souk Ahras and Khenchela in Algeria against Salafist groups. Some 5,000 Tunisian military personnel, including armor assets, are to conduct military operations against specific targets as well as combing some sites and enhancing security patrols and checkpoints on the roads, lanes and paths across the border.

== Turkey ==
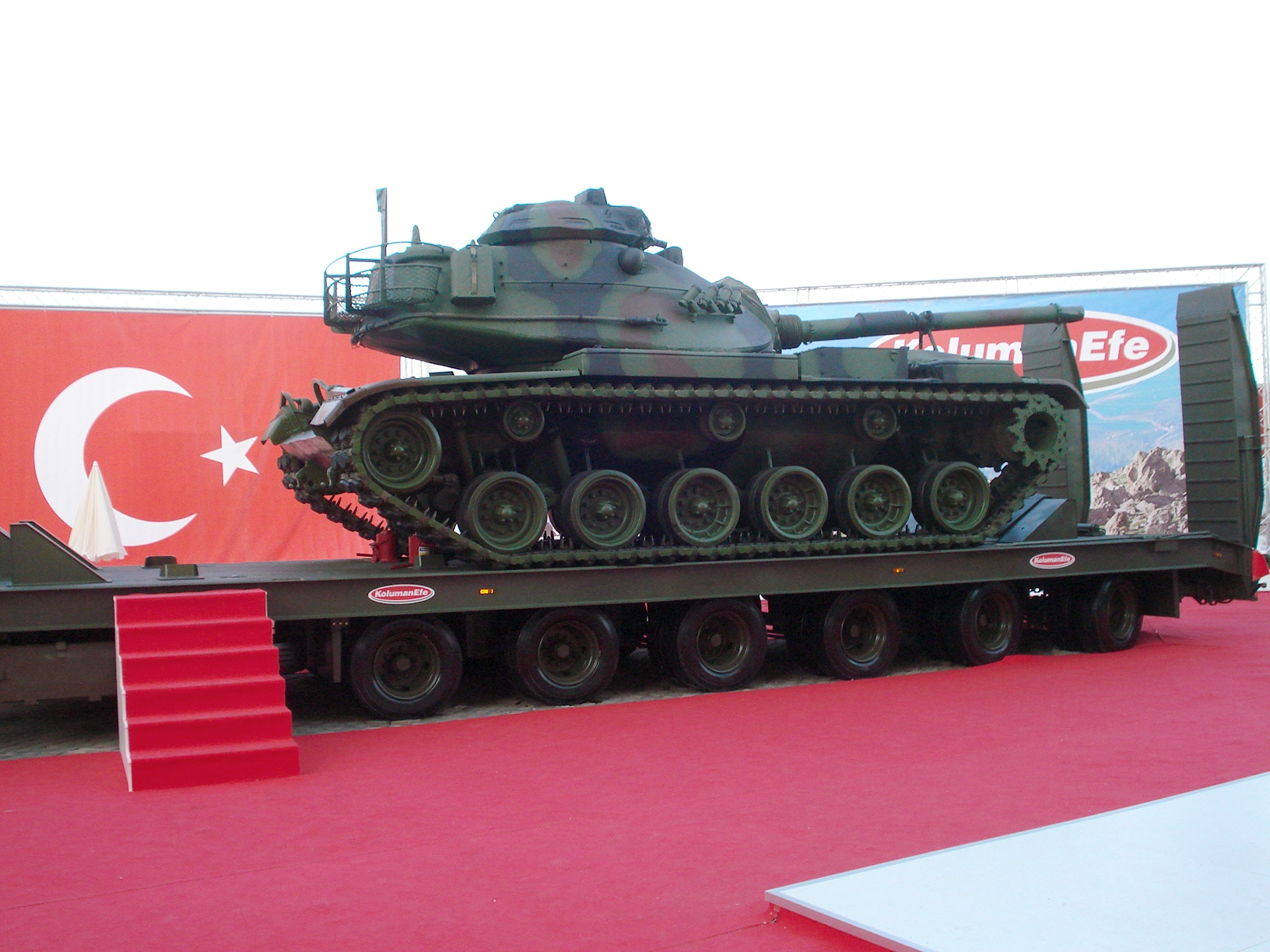
A M60A3 TTS tank of the Turkish Army at the IDEF '07 Show, Ankara, Turkey

As a key member of NATO, Turkey received 658 M60A3TTSs and some 104 M60A1RISE Passive tanks through the Conventional Forces in Europe (CFE) Treaty between 1990 and 1992. 170 of these M60A1 have been upgraded to the M60T variant.

Approximately 80 M60A3 and M60T tanks of the Turkish Army, jointly with Syrian rebel factions of the Free Syrian Army (FSA) conducted Operation Euphrates Shield (ES) beginning in August 2016, aiming to clear an area of 5,000 square kilometers of Syrian territory controlled by ISIS forces. During the fighting in and around the city of Al-Bab in December the Turkish 16th Mechanized Brigade lost at least one M60T due to an ATGM missile with reports that the driver suffered minor injuries (concussion and hearing loss).

They have bought Leopard 2s in 2005 from stocks made redundant by German military cutbacks to begin the process of replacing M60s still in service as well as developing its own Altay MBT. Turkey has been systematically upgrading its remaining fleet of M60s. Under a 2002 contract, Israel Military Industries had upgraded a batch of 170 M60A1s now designated in the Turkish inventory as M60Ts. The contract price was $688 million but the actual figure was higher.

In January 2017, Turkey announced a competitive bid to upgrade a batch of 200 tanks including 40 M60A3s, 40 Leopard 2A4s and 120 M60Ts. Estimated value of the contract is $500 million. The major goal of the upgrade program are to be armor improvements and installing active protection systems. The program comes with a priority tag from the Turkish government after several Turkish tanks have been hit by ISIL militants during the Turkish military's incursion into Syria.

As of 2018, the Turkish army currently has the following quantities and types of tanks in its arsenal: 339 Leopard 2A4, 391 Leopard 1R, 170 M60T, 619 M60A3 TTS, 752 M60 A3 and 758 M48A5T2. Turkey's goal is to replace the older M48-series and M60-series tanks with the Altay MBT.

== Yemen ==
North Yemen received its first 64 M60A1s in 1980, as part of a $400 million arms transfer from the United States requested by Saudi Arabia to counter border disputes with the communist People's Democratic Republic of Yemen government of South Yemen. During the 1980s Saudi Arabia provided more M60s to North Yemen reaching a height of approximately 250 by 1990. With the collapse of communism, South Yemen was unified with the Yemen Arab Republic (commonly known as "North Yemen") on 22 May 1990, to form the present-day Yemen.

In 1994, South Yemen declared its secession from the north, which resulted in the north occupying south Yemen and the 1994 civil war. On 27 April, a fierce battle took place between Yemeni forces in the wadis east of Zingibar involving M60A1 tanks and infantry from Yemen's Amaliqa brigade. Opposing them were the 119th Brigade, which had defected to the opposition. Hundreds of Somali refugees were killed when their camp on the southern coast of Yemen was caught in crossfire between the two sides.

The defeat of the PDRY forces opened the way for the advance to Aden which fell on 7 July. Other resistance quickly collapsed and thousands of southern leaders and military went into exile. As of 2015, there are an estimated 50 M60A1s in service with the Yemeni Army. In February 2018, the Yemeni National Army launched Operation Restore Legitimacy, employing its armor units and artillery to defeat Houthi rebels in several areas east of the city of Hodeidah.
