= Share'e Al-Bahlawan =

- شارع البهلوان
- Directed by: Salah Abu Seif; Mahmoud Farid and Hamada Abdel Wahab (assistant directors)
- Written by: Abdelhalim Morsi and Ali El Zorkani (story); Salah Abu Seif (screenplay and dialogue)
- Produced by: Gabriel Telhami
- Starring: Camelia; Kamal el-Shennawi; Lola Sedky; Hassan Fayek; Ismail Yassine; Zeinat Sedki; Abdulhamid Zaki; Mohamed Tawfik; Elias Moadab; Thurayya Fakhry
- Music by: Muhammad Hassan al-Shujai
- Release date: December 12, 1949
- Running time: 98 minutes
- Country: Egypt
- Language: Arabic

Share’ Al-Bahlawan (Arabic: شارع البهلوان, lit. "Acrobat Street") is an Egyptian comedy film released on December 12, 1949. The film is directed by Salah Abu Seif, features a screenplay co-written by Mahmoud Farid and Hamada Abdel Wahab, and stars Camelia, Kamal el-Shennawi, and Lola Sedky.

== Synopsis ==
The story revolves around three friends:

- Said (Kamal al-Shennawi) is married to Amina (Camelia) and is jealously protective of her
- Kamel (Hassan Fayek) is married to Zahira (Zeinat Sedki), a boxing fan
- Ibrahim (Abdelhamid Zaki), a reactionary man, is married to Mervat (Lola Sedky)

The plot thickens when Kamel sends love letters to Mervat that are written by Said. Meanwhile, Kamel sends the letters in his own handwriting to Amina. After Amina and Mervat discover the letters, the three friends meet, exchange accusations, and each suspects their wife of adultery.

== Production ==
Filming coincided with the beginning of Ramadan in July 1949, and Kamal al-Shennawi refused to kiss his co-star Camelia during the day despite director Salah Abu Seif’s insistence, and so they had to wait all day to film it. It was all for naught, since a censor had removed the scene unbeknownst to the filmmaker.
