= 2017 Rafah terror attack =

Violent attack on an Egyptian Armed Forces checkpoint

Rafah terror attack
- Part of the Sinai Insurgency
Date	7 July 2017
Location	Rafah, Egypt

Belligerents
Egyptian Army	Islamic State of Iraq and the Levant - Sinai Province

Commanders and leaders
Ahmed Mansi †	Khairat El Sobky Hanafi Gamal

Strength
30 soldiers	100 terrorists 13 cars

Casualties and losses
20 killed 3 injured	46 killed 6 cars destroyed
- 66 total killed

The Rafah terror attack, also called the "Battle of Al-Barth", was a terrorist attack conducted by the Islamic State – Sinai Province on an Egyptian Armed Forces checkpoint in Rafah in North Sinai on 7 July 2017 and resulted in the death and injury of 23 Egyptian soldiers, including the high-ranking El-Sa'ka officer, Col. Ahmed Mansi. 46 terrorists were killed and six cars of the militants were destroyed in the attack.

Following the attack, multiple domestic and international reactions condemned the attack, included Al-Azhar, the Coptic Orthodox Church, UAE, United Kingdom, United Nations, United States, Bahrain, Germany, Iran, Jordan, Kuwait, Palestine, Tunisia, and Saudi Arabia.

== Responses in Egypt ==
Local Egyptian organizations and public figures condemned the attack and praised the military forces. The Egyptian cabinet, Al-Azhar and the Coptic Orthodox Church have all condemned the terrorist attack.

The president Abdel Fattah el-Sisi expressed condolences to the families of the martyrs and ordered a special care to be provided for the injured. He asserted that extremists are trying to undermine Egypt's security and stability while the country is gearing up to eliminate terror threats and to carry out development projects nationwide.

In an official statement, the Egyptian cabinet praised the army for "foiling the attack" and Prime Minister Sherif Ismail offered his condolences to the victims. Ismail stressed the necessity of efforts worldwide joining to confront terrorism and putting an end to the support for terrorism.

The head of the administrative prosecution Rashida Fathullah offered condolences to the families of the victims and wished a speedy recovery for all those injured.

The Egyptian Dar al-Ifta' – the Sunni institution concerning with issuing fatwas and Islamic laws – mourned soldiers killed in the terror attack at the checkpoint.

Al-Azhar also issued a statement condemning the attack; Grand Imam Ahmad el-Tayyeb said that "the pure blood (of the slain soldiers) will be a curse to those cowards and their supporters domestically and internationally, and those who sold their religion and betrayed their nations." El-Tayyeb also called for unified international efforts in countering terrorist groups and those countries which sponsor them. He also called on all Egyptians to stand behind their armed forces and police to defeat terrorism.

The Coptic Orthodox Church headed by Pope Tawadros II and the Evangelical Church also strongly condemned the attack.

== International reactions ==
Multiple foreign countries and leaders have issued statements condemning the militant attack in North Sinai.

=== Bahrain ===
Bahrain said in a statement, "The terrorist act, which represents an affront to religion, is contrary to all human and moral values and principles."

=== European Union ===
Ivan Surkoš, the Ambassador of the European Union to Egypt said on his Twitter account "The EU is Egypt's ally in fighting terrorism."

=== Germany ===
The German Embassy in Cairo also denounced the brutal attack, stressing that Berlin stands with Egypt in the face of terrorism.

=== Iran ===
Iran slammed the terrorist attack and warned against a recent wave of desperate terrorist operations by defeated IS groups across the globe.

=== Jordan ===
The Jordanian government has condemned a terrorist attack. Jordan's Minister of State for Media Affairs and government spokesman Mohammad Momani expressed Jordan's solidarity with Egypt in facing terrorism and rejecting all forms of terrorist acts that aim to destabilise Egypt's security and stability, calling for collective international action to eradicate terrorism.

=== Kuwait ===
Kuwait stressed its support for all measures taken by Egypt to preserve its security and stability. All efforts should be made to "fight such dangerous phenomena that targets humanity and the security and stability of the whole world," read a foreign ministry statement.

Kuwaiti Emir Sheikh Sabah al-Ahmad al-Sabah also sent a cable of condolences to President Abdel Fattah el-Sisi regarding the victims.

=== Palestine ===
Palestinian President Mahmoud Abbas condemned the attack, with presidency spokesperson Nail Abo Rodaina denouncing in strongest terms the terrorist operation. He also stressed the Palestinian nation and leadership's support for Egypt's war on terrorism.

=== Tunisia ===
Tunisia decried the attack through its foreign affairs ministry. "In the face of the dangerous implications of terrorism and extremism of all kinds for the security and stability of states and the serious threat to international peace and security, Tunis is reiterating its call for the international community to join efforts and intensify coordination to overcome it and snuff out its sources," the statement said.

=== UAE ===
The UAE Foreign Ministry praised the Egyptian Armed Forces for tackling the aftermath of the terrorist attack, by destroying several vehicles and killing the militants who attacked the checkpoint. The UAE, in a foreign ministry statement, described the attack as a "new crime that is added to the black record of terrorism and terrorists."

=== United Kingdom ===
The UK condemns the terrorist attack on members of the Egyptian Armed Forces in Rafah. The British Ambassador in Cairo John Casson said: "I am disgusted by the terrorist attack on members of the Egyptian Armed Forces as they did their duty in Rafah, Northern Sinai today. On behalf of the British Government, I condemn it wholeheartedly."

=== United States ===
The U.S. Embassy in Cairo condemned the attack on their official Twitter account saying, "Another outrageous terror attack in Egypt. The United States stands with Egypt against terrorism."

=== International organizations ===
United Nations Secretary-General António Guterres and the Security Council have underscored the need to bring the perpetrators to justice. In a statement attributable to his spokesperson, Mr. Guterres "reiterated the UN's support to the Government of Egypt in its fight against terrorism and violent extremism."

The Organisation of Islamic Cooperation (OIC) condemned in the strongest possible terms the terrorist attack. OIC Secretary-General Yousef al-Othaimeen, in a statement described the attack as a cowardly and heinous. He stressed the solidarity of the OIC with the Egyptian government in face of terrorism.

== See also ==
- Sinai terror attacks
- 2017 Sinai mosque attack
- Comprehensive Operation – Sinai 2018
- Refuting ISIS
- Defeating ISIS
