= Nadia Ahmed Abdou =

Egyptian politician

Nadia Ahmed Abdou is an Egyptian politician. She previously served as the governor of Baheira Governorate, Egypt and was the first female governor in Egypt. She was born in Alexandria, Egypt.
