= Kom Hamada =

kom Hamada كوم حمادة
- City
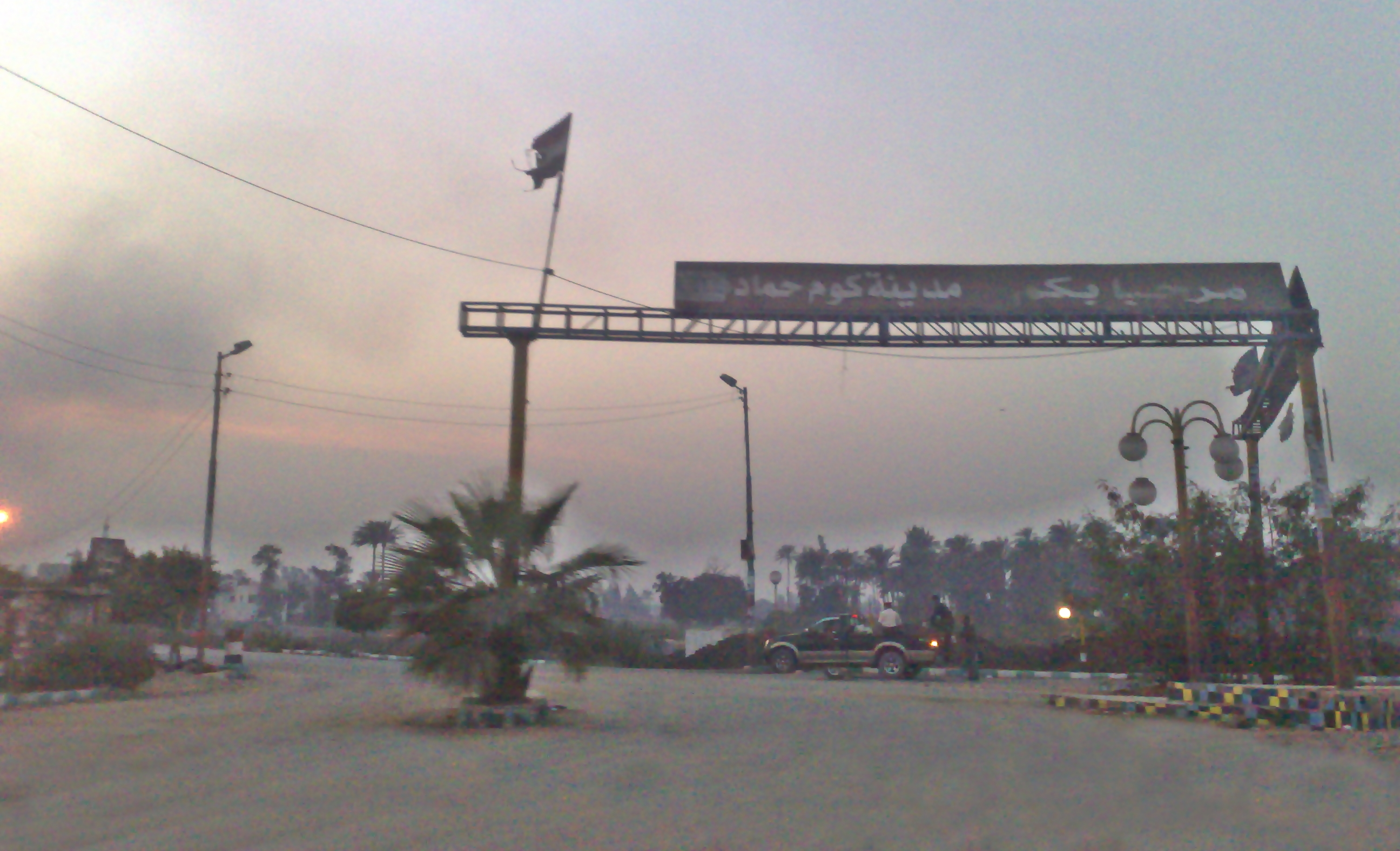
- Entrance sign

- Location in Egypt
- Coordinates: 30°45′45″N 30°41′50″E
- Country: Egypt
- Governorate: Beheira

Population (2006)
  - Total: 418,227
- Time zone: UTC+2 (EST)

Kom Hamada is a city in Beheira Governorate in Egypt.

== History ==
After the French campaign arrived to the west of Alexandria on July 2, 1798, AD, they marched into the city and occupied it and then by Napoleon took a march on Cairo through Damanhur, where he was able to occupy Rosetta on July 6 and reached Rahmaniyah, a village on the Nile, during which the Mamluks were preparing an army to confront The French armies led by Murad Bey, where the two armies met near Shubra Khit on July 13, 1798, CE.

== Population ==
Kom Hamada has a population of 41,227, of whom 19,169 are male and 22,058 are female, according to the 2006 official census.
