= Hosh Essa =

Hoch Eissa حوش عيسى
- City
- Location in Egypt
- Coordinates: 30.905833°N 30.29161°E
- Country: Egypt
- Governorate: Beheira Governorate

Area
  - Total: 431.9 km^{2} (166.8 sq mi)
- Elevation: 3 m (9.8 ft)

Population (2021)
  - Total: 331,827
  - Density: 768.3/km^{2} (1,990/sq mi)
- Time zone: UTC+2 (EET)
  - Summer (DST): UTC+3 (EEST)

Hoch Eissa (Arabic: حوش عيسى) is a city in Beheira Governorate, Egypt.

The 1885 Census of Egypt recorded Hoch Eissa as a nahiyah in the district of Abu Hummus in Beheira Governorate; at that time, the population of the town was 1,480 (745 men and 735 women).

== Archaeology ==
=== Al-Qalaye ===
Al-Qalaye is an archaeological site in the Al-Ruba'iyat area of Hosh Issa, regarded as the second largest cluster of monastic remains in the history of Christian monasticism. Excavations at the site began in 2023 and have brought to light groups of monastic cells called manshubiyat, along with buildings that supported the community's operations.

In March 2026, a mission announced the discovery of a late antique guesthouse dating to the 5th century, made up of thirteen interconnected rooms that served various functions. They include private and shared living spaces for monks, a large room where visitors were received and instruction took place, a niche oriented toward the east for prayer, and areas set aside for cooking and storing supplies. The excavation also uncovered paintings of monks, floral and geometric ornamentation, a marble column, decorated pottery fragments, and a stone marker carved with Coptic script that appears to record the name of a monk, Apa Kyr, son of Shenouda.

=== Tell Al-Abqain ===
In 2024, a major New Kingdom military fort and barracks have been discovered by Egyptian archaeologists in Tell Al-Abqain in the Hosh Issa district of the Beheira Governorate. Tell Al-Abqain is located about 7km southeast of Hosh Essa.

This well-preserved outpost dates back to the reign of Pharaoh Ramesses II. The fort guarded Egypt's northwestern frontier against foreign invasions. A bronze sword bearing the cartouche and titles of Ramesses II has been found, as well as a stone block with his name.

Several mudbrick architectural units, including military barracks for soldiers and large storage rooms were discovered.

== See also ==
- List of cities and towns in Egypt
- Wadi El Natrun#Monastic history
