= Al Buhayrah, Yemen =

Al Buhayrah
- Location in Yemen
- Coordinates: 15°57′39″N 48°43′03″E
- Country: Yemen
- Governorate: Hadhramaut
- Time zone: UTC+3 (Yemen Standard Time)

Al Buḩayrah (also Romanized as Al-Buḥairah) is a town in Ḩaḑramawt Governorate, Yemen.
