= Beheira Governorate =

Governorate of Egypt

Beheira Governorate محافظة البحيرة
- Governorate
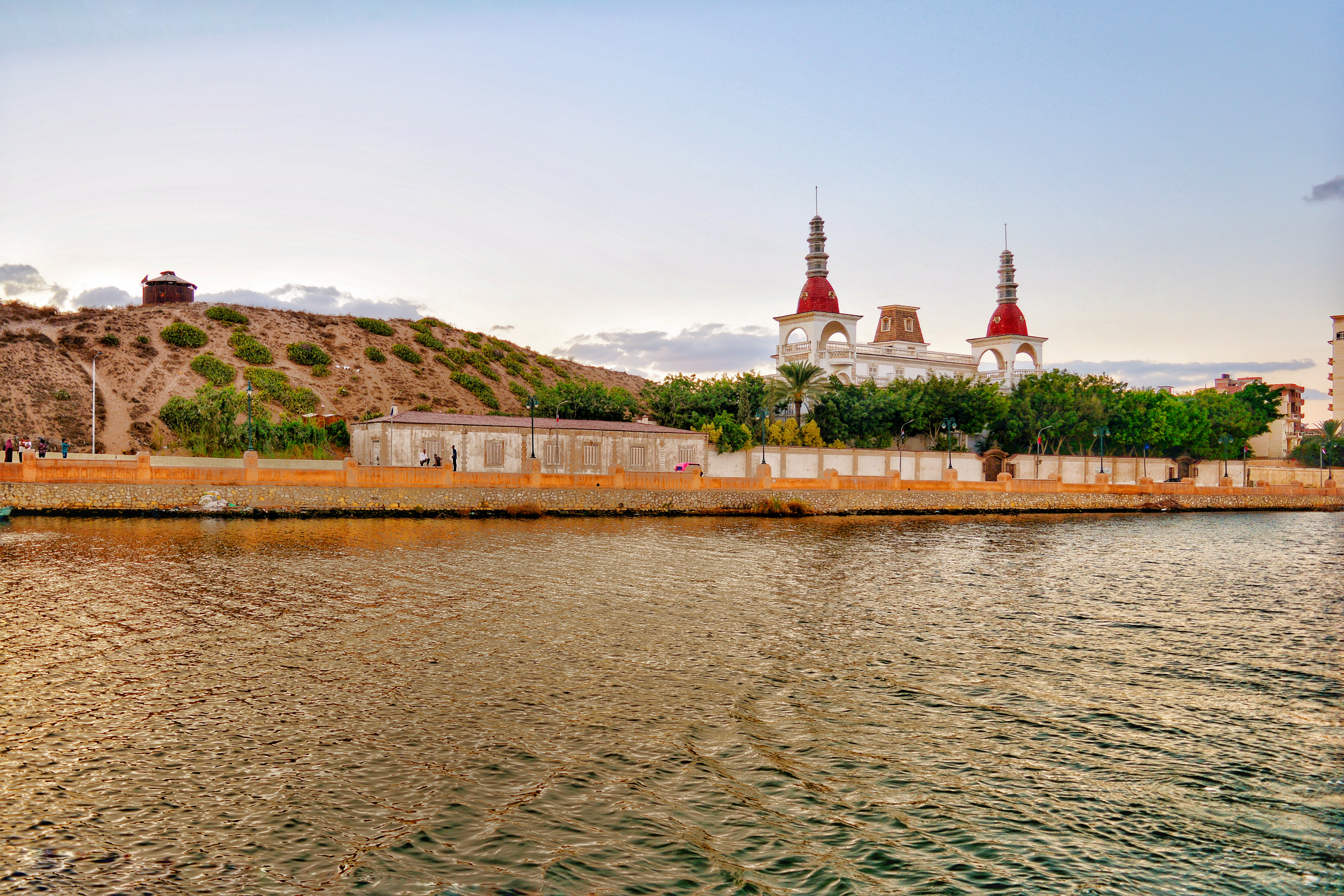

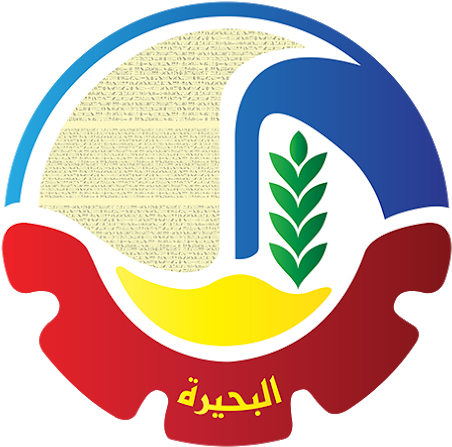
- Flag Seal

- Beheira Governorate subdivisions

- Beheira Governorate on the map of Egypt
- Coordinates: 30.61°N 30.43°E
- Country: Egypt
- Seat: Damanhur (capital)

Government
  - Governor: Jacqueline Azer

Area
  - Total: 9,826 km^{2} (3,794 sq mi)

Population (January 2024)
  - Total: 6,992,742
  - Density: 711.7/km^{2} (1,843/sq mi)

GDP
  - Total: EGP 289 billion (US$ 18.4 billion)
- Time zone: UTC+2 (EGY)
  - Summer (DST): UTC+3 (EEST)
- ISO 3166 code: EG-BH
- HDI (2023): 0.740 high · 16th
- Website: behira.gov.eg

Beheira (Arabic: محافظة البحيرة, romanized: Muḥāfaẓat al-Buḥayra, Egyptian Arabic pronunciation: [moˈħɑfzˤet elbeˈħeːɾæ]; lit. 'Governorate of the Lake') is a coastal governorate in northern Egypt. Located in the northern part of the country in the Nile Delta, its capital is Damanhur.

== Overview ==
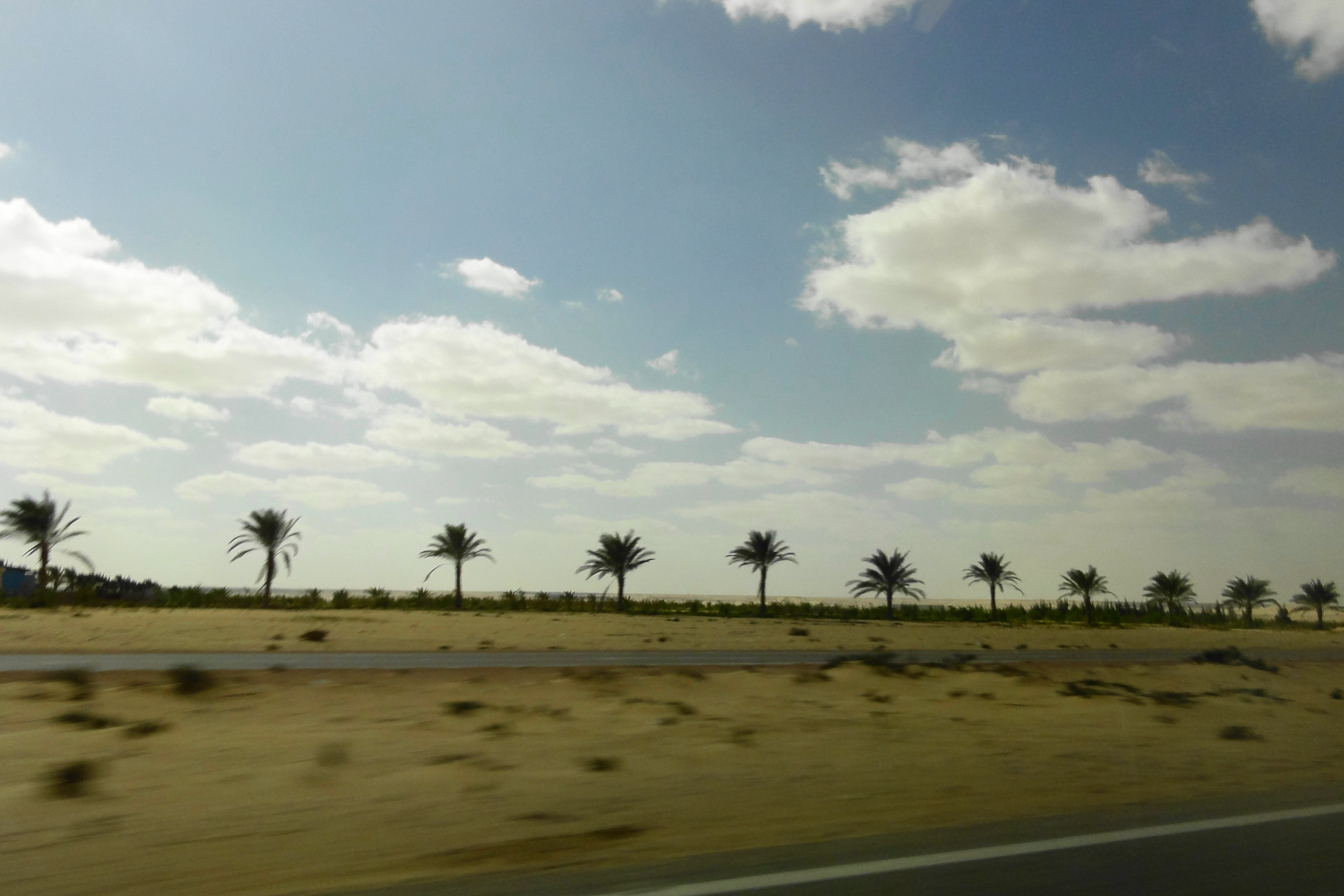
Wadi El Natrun - El Alamein Rd, El Beheira Governorate, Egypt

Beheira Governorate enjoys an important strategical location, west of the Rosetta branch of the Nile. It comprises four important highways, namely the Cairo-Alexandria desert road, the Cairo agricultural road, the international road, and the circular road. Beheira Governorate is also home to a number of the most important Coptic monasteries in Wadi El Natrun (Scetes).

Beheira consists of 13 marakez and 14 cities, and contains important industries such as cotton, chemicals, carpets, electricity, and fishing.

The governorate has a noteworthy number of archaeological sites, including at Abu El Matamir, Abu Hummus, Damanhour, Rosetta (Rashid), and Kafr El Dawwar. Coins, lamps, animal bones, and pottery from Roman and later Eastern Roman (Byzantine) eras are some of the archaeological finds discovered at Kom El Giza, and Kom El Hamam in Beheira.

In 2017, Egyptian President Abdel Fattah al-Sissi appointed the first female governor in the country's history, Nadia Ahmed Abdou, for Beheira Governorate.

== Municipal divisions ==
The governorate is divided into the following municipal divisions for administrative purposes, with a total estimated population as of January 2024 of 6,992,742. In some instances there is a markaz and a kism with the same name.

Municipal Divisions
Anglicized name	Native name	Arabic transliteration	Population (January 2023 Est.)	Type
Abu El Matamir	مركز ابو المطامير	Abū al-Maṭāmīr	603,640	Markaz
Abu Hummus	مركز أبو حمص	Abū Ḥummuṣ	581,820	Markaz
El Delengat	مركز الدلنجات	Ad-Dilinjāt	400,570	Markaz
Mahmoudiyah	مركز المحمودية	Al-Maḥmūdiyah	305,974	Markaz
Rahmaniya	مركز الرحمانية	Ar-Raḥmāniyah	176,315	Markaz
Badr	مركز بدر	Badr	208,542	Markaz
Damanhour	قسم دمنهور	Damanhūr	327,352	Kism (fully urban)
Damanhour	مركز دمنهور	Damanhūr	586,244	Markaz
West Nubariyah	قسم غرب النوبارية	Gharb an-Nūbāriyah	130,405	Kism (urban and rural parts)
Hosh Essa	مركز حوش عيسى	Ḥawsh 'Īsā	339,556	Markaz
Edku	مركز إدكو	Idkū	257,873	Markaz
Itay El Barud	مركز إيتاى البارود	Ityāy al-Bārūd	476,197	Markaz
Kafr El Dawwar	قسم كفر الدوار	Kafr ad-Dawwār	344,133	Kism (urban and rural parts)
Kafr El Dawwar	مركز كفر الدوار	Kafr ad-Dawwār	749,595	Markaz
Kom Hamada	مركز كوم حمادة	Kawm Ḥamādah	496,752	Markaz
Rosetta	مركز رشيد	Rashīd	309,188	Markaz
Shubrakhit	مركز شبرا خيت	Shubrākhīt	302,429	Markaz
Natrn Valley	مركز وادى النطرون	Wadi an-Natrun	90,576	Markaz

== Population ==
According to population estimates, in 2024 the majority of residents in the governorate lived in rural areas, with an urbanization rate of only 19.5%. Out of an estimated 6,992,742 people residing in the governorate, 5,629,157 people lived in rural areas as opposed to only 1,363,585 in urban areas.

== Archaeology ==
In March 2026, archaeologists from the Egyptian Ministry of Tourism and Antiquities announced the discovery of a 5th-century CE building at the Qalaye site in Hosh Issa, identified as a monastic guesthouse from the early period of Coptic monasticism. The structure, consisting of multiple rooms and functional spaces, was likely used to host visitors and monks, reflecting a transition from isolated ascetic practices to more organized, semi-communal religious life. Architectural features, including decorated elements and designated communal areas, provide valuable insights into the evolution of early monastic complexes and daily life within one of Egypt’s major monastic centers.

== Cities and towns ==
- Abu Hummus
- Abu El Matamir
- Damanhur
- Edku
- El Delengat
- El Mahmoudiyah
- El Rahmaniya
- Itay El Barud
- Hosh Essa
- Kafr El Dawwar
- Kom Hamada
- Rosetta
- Shubrakhit
- Wadi El Natrun
- El Nubaria

== Notable people ==
- Mahmud Shaltut, former Grand Imam of Al-Azhar
- Pope Benjamin I of Alexandria, former Pope of Alexandria & Patriarch of the See of St. Mark
- Mohammed al-Ghazali, Islamic Scholar
- Hassan Shehata, football manager
- Karim Hafez, footballer

== Industrial zones ==
According to the Governing Authority for Investment and Free Zones (GAFI), the following industrial zones are located in Beheira:

Zone name
New El Nubaria Industrial Zone

== Projects and programs ==
In 1981, the Basic Village Service Program (BVS), under the auspices of USAID, had several water, road, and other projects, going on in several markazes in Beheira Governorate.

In 2018 the governorate council discussed a campaign of mosquito control and animal control to avert the spread of preventable diseases.
