= Itay El Barud =

Itay El Barud إيتاي البارود
- City
- Location in Egypt
- Coordinates: 30.887°N 30.665°E
- Country: Egypt
- Governorate: Beheira

Population (2006)
  - Total: 44,856
- Time zone: UTC+2 (EET)
  - Summer (DST): UTC+3 (EEST)

Itay El Barud is a city in Egypt.

== History ==
Itay El Barud was mentioned by Amelino, Ibn Matti and Al-Zubaidi, and Ibn al-Jiyan mentioned it in the ninth century AH with the name (Atiyeh and its miniature), and its name is Coptic (Eiti) and it turned into (Aitiyeh). Then it emerged in the history of the year 1228 in the name of (Itay El-Baroud) and became center of the Dalangat in 1884, then it was named markaz Itai El-Baroud in 1896.

== Geography ==
Itay El-Baroud is located on the agricultural road between Cairo and Alexandria, north of Kafr El Zayat and south of Damanhour, and is 140 km away from Cairo and 84 km from Alexandria.

== Population ==
Itay's population reached 44,856, of whom 21,991 were male and 22,865 were female, according to the 2006 official census.
