= Comprehensive Operation – Sinai 2018 =

Egyptian counter-terrorism campaign

Comprehensive Operation − Sinai 2018 (Arabic: العملية الشاملة − سيناء 2018) (Note: Also referred to more simply as Sinai 2018, or COS 2018.) is the code name of a large counter-terrorism campaign conducted by the Egyptian Armed Forces and the Interior Ministry. The operation was initiated on February 9, 2018, and focuses on northern and central Sinai and parts of the Nile Delta. It mainly targets Islamist insurgents, as well as "other criminal activity that affects national security and stability", according to the Armed Forces press statement that announced the start of the campaign.

Following the Al-Rawda mosque attack of late November 2017, the deadliest of its kind in Egypt's modern history, President Abdel Fattah el-Sisi gave the country's main security institutions a three-month deadline to secure the Sinai, a region that has witnessed an insurgency since the start of the Egyptian revolution of 2011. Security preparations for COS 2018 were reported from as early as January.

== Preparation ==
Security measures undertaken in Sinai by the government were reported a month prior to the operation. In January, military reinforcements arrived in the city of Al-Hasana in a scale "unprecedented" since the 2013 escalation in violence, according to Mada Masr quoting local residents. The equipment involved included Humvees, tanks and armored personnel carriers. Asharq Al-Awsat, citing an unnamed security source, reported on 16 January that the deployments intensified in Arish, Sheikh Zuweid and Rafah in the past ten days, where authorities, backed by special forces, increased their gathering of intelligence through local pro-government tribal agents, UAVs and night vision devices. The Armed Forces intensified regulations on land crossings through the Suez Canal. According to Mada Masr, vehicles with license plates from North Sinai were restricted from passing through the Ahmed Hamdi Tunnel, thereby limiting the entry of supplies to the region's shop owners.

On February 7, two days before the announcement of Sinai 2018, Mada Masr reported that a large number of medical staff from different governorates in Egypt, mainly surgeons and anesthesiologists, were assigned by the Health Ministry to hospitals in the Ismailia Governorate and the Sinai for a period of three months at the request of the Armed Forces. Hospitals and ambulances in Arish were in a state of high alert. In the early morning hours of February 9, the day COS 2018 was launched, security forces shut down the North Sinai Coastal Road linking all the major cities and towns in the region, which had all their entrances barred to anyone entering or leaving. All schools throughout North Sinai were cancelled as of the following day, and university semesters were postponed. Gas stations in Arish were banned from pumping fuel to civilian vehicles. All Suez Canal crossings were closed. On the border with Gaza, the recently reopened Rafah Border Crossing was closed indefinitely by the Egyptian government until further notice. Palestinians who were already present on the Egyptian side of the border were escorted back to Gaza amid scuffles with security personnel.

== Announcement ==
At around 11:15 a.m. on February 9, Col. Tamer el-Refai, the military's spokesman, announced in a statement on state-run television, titled "Communique 1 from the General Command of the Armed Forces", the launching of Comprehensive Operation – Sinai 2018. The scope of the campaign would involve not only Sinai, but also other parts of Egypt, including the Nile Delta and the Western Desert. "Great people of Egypt, in accordance with the delegation issued by the President of the Republic, the Supreme Commander of the Egyptian Armed Forces, to the General Command of the Egyptian Armed Forces and the Interior Ministry to comprehensively confront terrorism as well other criminal activities in close cooperation with all state institutions," he said. According to the statement, military exercises would also be carried out as part of the operation. El-Refai concluded the statement by calling on all Egyptians to cooperate with law enforcement agencies and to report "elements that threaten the security and stability of the homeland" to authorities.

The Interior Ministry, on its part, raised the nationwide state of alert to the highest level, and focused on securing vital state facilities, including water and energy plants, as well as places of worship and tourist spots among other places.

== Conclusion ==
By October 2018, according to government affiliated News sources "Communique 28 from the General Command of the Armed Forces" announced the defeat of the terrorists, after that terrorist organisation were largely dormant with ISIS activities confined to small attacks
