= Structure of the Egyptian Army =

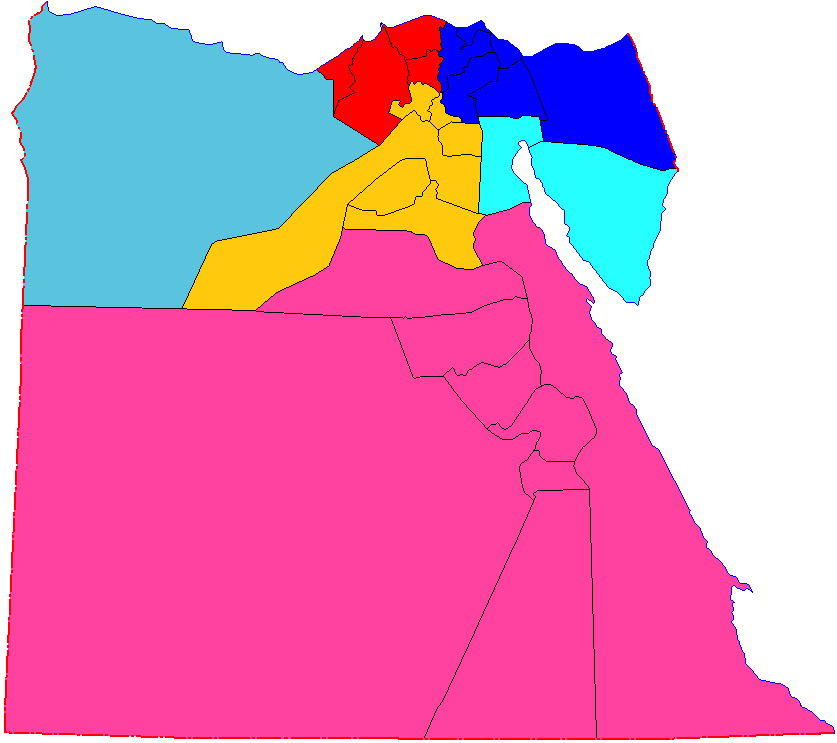
Western Military Region Northern Military Region Southern Military Region Central Military Region East Military Canal Zone Second Field Army Third Field Army

The structure of the Egyptian Army depicted below focuses on operational organisation.

Under the Ministry of Defense is the Military Operations Authority with its headquarters in Cairo. The Chief of Staff of the Armed Forces's office is in Cairo. He is also chief of staff of the army. Formally, he is also chief of staff of the air force and navy as well, but apparently the commanders of the other two services frequently report directly to the Minister of Defense/Commander-in-Chief. From the Chief of Staff's office are directed four military regions, and the Unified Command East of the Canal, which in turn directs the two field armies.

== Structure ==
=== Central Military Region ===
- HQ, Central Military Region: Heliopolis, Greater Cairo
  - Field HQ, Heliopolis, Central Military Region
  - Field HQ, El Qanater, Central Military Region
    - Sub-Field HQ, Tanta, Central Military Region
    - Sub-Field HQ, Zagazig, Central Military Region
  - Field HQ, Qom Ushim, El Fayum, Central Military Region
  - Field HQ, Beni Suef, Central Military Region

=== Northern Military Region ===
- HQ, Northern Military Region, Alexandria
  - Field HQ, Alexandria, Northern Military Region
    - Sub-Field HQ, Abou Qir, Northern Military Region
    - Sub-Field HQ, Mariout, Northern Military Region
  - Field HQ, Rashid, Northern Military Region
  - Field HQ, Damietta, Northern Military Region

=== East Military Canal Zone ===
- HQ, Eastern Military Region, Suez
  - Field HQ, Port Said, Northern Suez Canal Military Region
  - Field HQ, Ismaelia, Central Suez Canal Military Region
  - Field HQ, El Mansoura, El Daqahliya, Eastern Delta Military Region
  - Field HQ, El Suez, Southern Suez Canal Military Region
  - Field HQ, Cairo-Suez Highway Military Region
  - Field HQ, Hurghada, Red Sea Military Region

=== Western Military Region ===
- HQ, Western Military Region, Mersa Matruh
  - Field HQ, Sidi Barrani, Western Military Region
  - Field HQ, Marsa Matrouh, Western Military Region
  - Field HQ, Sallum, Western Military Region

=== Southern Military Region ===
- HQ, Southern Military Region, Assiut
  - Field HQ, El Minya, Southern Military Region
  - Field HQ, Qena, Southern Military Region
  - Field HQ, Sohag, Southern Military Region
  - Field HQ, Aswan, Southern Military Region

== Unit Organization ==
=== Division ===
An Egyptian Army Division organization may differ between Armored and Infantry.

- Mechanized Infantry division usually consists of two Mechanized brigades, one Armored brigade (96 Tanks), one Field/SP Artillery brigade (36 guns) (maybe both depending on the size and objective of the division), Air Defense Regiment, Anti-Tank Regiment and smaller support battalions and companies. The number of tanks in a Mechanized division varies between 150 and 180 tanks. It also has around/over 13,000 troops in total during peace and war times.
- Armored division has the same structure but with more tanks (240-300 tanks) and the existence of two Armored brigades and one Mechanized brigade instead and only one Anti-Tank battalion for the Mechanized brigade. It also has around/over 12,000 troops.

=== Armored Brigades ===
Armored brigades consists of 3 tank battalions (96-126 tanks), 1 Mechanized battalion, 1 SP Artillery battalion (12 guns), 1 Air Defense company, Armored Recon. company, Engineer company, Signal company, Logistical Support company, Maintenance company and Medical platoon and Chemical Warfare platoon.

    - An Armored battalion consists of 31-42 tanks (depending on the brigade's size and what kind of unit is it a part of). Where it compromises (3-4 tank companies, anti-tank company and HQ platoon)
    - Mechanized battalions in Armored units consists of 576 troops organized in 4 companies.

=== Mechanized Brigades ===
Mechanized brigade in a mechanized division is larger than mechanized brigade in armored divisions. This kind of brigades in general consists of 3 mechanized battalions, 1 tank battalion (31-41 tanks) and support units as 1 field artillery battalion (12 guns), 1 Air defense battalion, 1 Anti-Tank battalion, Signal company, Military Police company, Recon battalion, Medical company, Engineer company, Chemical Warfare company, Supply company and Transport company. Mechanized brigades has a total of 3500 troops.

    - A Mechanized battalion of mechanized units consists of 500 to 610 troops organized in 4-5 companies.

=== Infantry Brigade ===
An Infantry Brigade consists of 2 Infantry Battalions, 2 Mechanized Battalions (armed with lightly protected vehicles), Tank Battalion and Support Units.

- Infantry Battalions has a total of 700 troops. Infantry brigades contain more than 1000 troops but initially, under the law of Military Limitations. Major General Mujid made it 2051 troops limitation.

=== Artillery Brigade ===
An Artillery Brigade in the Egyptian Army differs between armored artillery and mechanized artillery brigades. By which, artillery brigades in mechanized divisions consists of two Field/Self-Propelled (SP) Artillery battalions (for mechanized brigades), one Rocket Artillery battalion (for the armored brigade), and one command battalion (total 36 guns and 108 trucks) artillery brigades compromises around 1500 troops.

While artillery brigades inside armored divisions consists of two rocket artillery battalions, one SP Artillery battalion and one command battalion (with the same number of equipment).

- Artillery battalions whether SP, Field or Rocket units all has the same structure, where an artillery battalion consists of 500 troops, 12 guns and 36 trucks. They are organized into 4 batteries.

=== Support Units ===
All support battalions compromise 400 troops except for companies that have only 100 troops.

== Corps ==
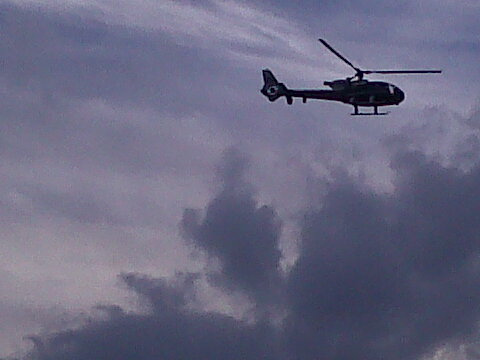
Republican Guard helicopter during the Egyptian Revolution of 2011

=== Republican Guard ===
- 1st Republican Guard Armored Division:
- 2 Republican Guard Armoured Brigades (33rd, 35th)
- 2 Republican Guard Mechanized Brigades (510th & 512th)

=== Armored Corps ===
- 4 Armored Divisions (4th, 6th, 9th, 21st)
- 4 Independent Armored Brigades (11th, 23rd, 44th, 76th)
- 2 Republican Guard Armored Brigades (33rd & 35th)

=== Infantry Corps ===
- 8 Mechanized Divisions (2nd, 3rd, 7th, 16th, 18th, 23rd, 33rd, 36th)
- 1 Infantry Division (19th)
- 4 Independent Mechanized Brigades (116th to 117th, 135th (former 130th Amphibious Brigade), 305th)
- 2 Republican Guard Mechanized Brigades (510th & 512th)

=== Artillery Corps ===
- One Republican Guard S/P Field Artillery Brigade
- Twelve S/P Field Artillery Brigades (41st, 44th, 47th, 49th, 51st, 55th, 59th to 61st, 65th, 69th to 70th)
- 12 Field Artillery Brigades (74th, 79th, 81st, 88th, 92nd, 99th, 122nd to 128th, 188th, 192nd, 815th, 816th)
- Six Anti-Tank Guided Missile Brigades (reported as the 33rd, 44th, 55th, 66th, 77th, 88th)

=== Egyptian Airborne Corps ===
- Four Airborne Brigades (170th & 182nd Airborne, 222nd & 224th Air Mobile)
- 27th Elite Parachute Battalion 'Bats'

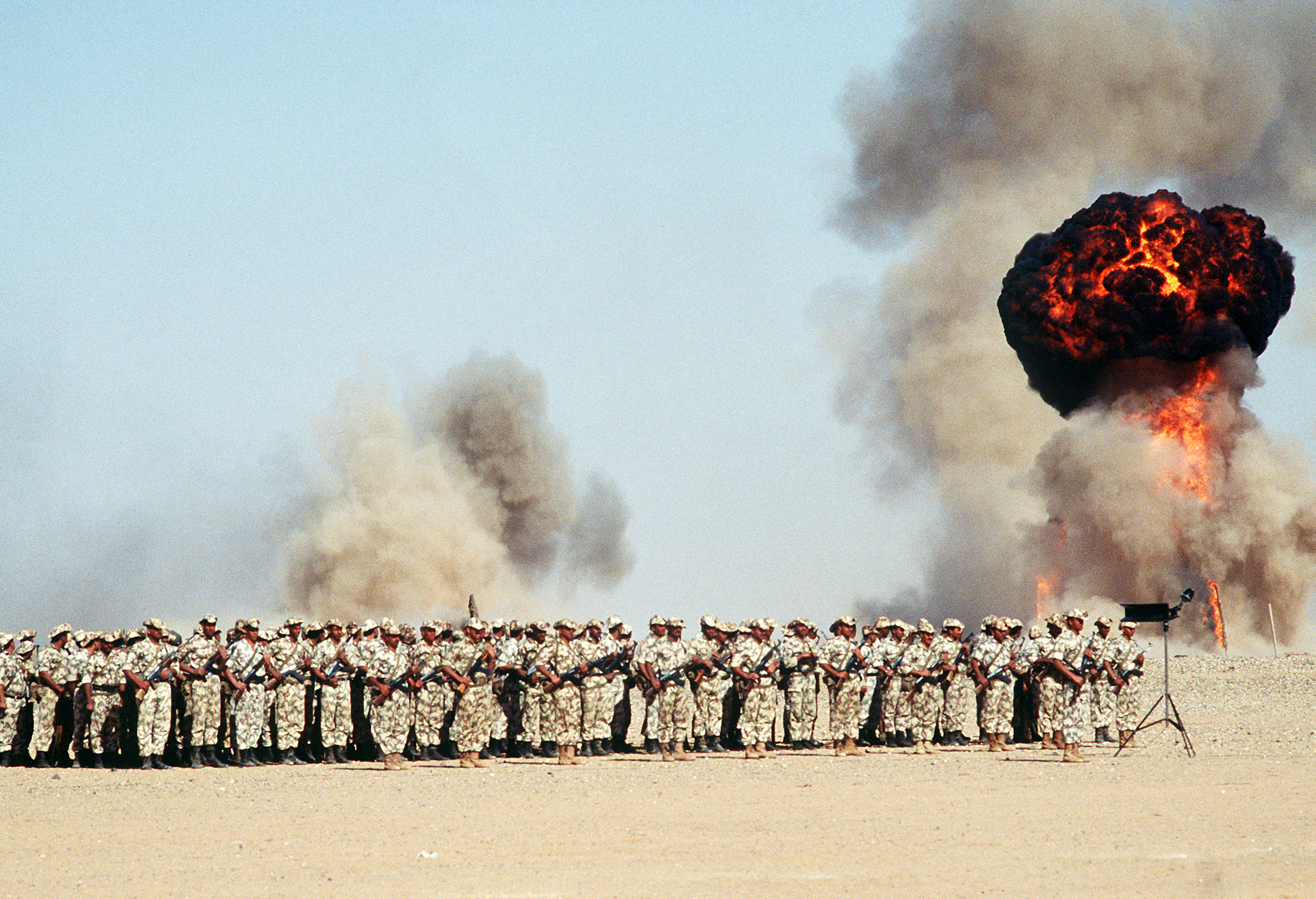
An Egyptian ranger battalion stands in formation during a live-fire and troop demonstration for visiting dignitaries during Operation Desert Shield.

=== Special Forces Corps ===
- 8 Special Forces Regiments/Groups (117th, 123rd, 129th, 135th, 141st, 147th, 153rd, 159th)

=== Signal Corps ===
- 18 Signal Regiments (601st to 619th)

=== Military Engineers Corps ===
- 9 Field Engineer Brigades (35th, 37th, 39th, 41st, 43rd, 45th to 47th, 49th)

=== Reconnaissance Corps ===
- 16 Reconnaissance battalions

=== Electronic Warfare Corps ===
- 20 Electronic Warfare Regiments (701th - 720th)

=== Medical Corps ===
- 27 Field Medical Battalions (1st to 27th)
- 108 Field Medical Companies (201st to 308th)

The Armed Forces Medical Service Department supervises over 40 military hospitals; there are also 3 Hospital Ships, 4 Hospital Barges reported.

=== Supply Corps ===
- 36 Field Supply Battalions (501st to 536th)

=== Quartermaster Corps ===
- 9 Central Military depots
- 16 Regional Military depots
- 32 Field Military depots

=== Military Police Corps ===
- 12 Inland MP Battalions (222nd, 224th, 226th, 228th, 230th, 232nd, 234th, 236th, 238th, 240th, 242nd, 244th)
- 12 Field MP Battalions (221st, 223rd, 225th, 227th, 229th, 231st, 233rd, 235th, 237th, 239th, 241st, 243rd)

=== Chemical Warfare Corps ===
- 13 Chemical Warfare Battalions

=== Border Guards Corps ===
H.Q. Command & 5 Field H.Q.

- 20 Battalions: 12,000 men, mostly Bedouins, lightly armed paramilitary forces equipped with remote sensors, night-vision binoculars, communications vehicles, and high-speed motorboats and responsible for:
- Border surveillance: 10 battalions
- General peacekeeping: 2 battalions
- Drug interdiction: 5 battalions
- Prevention of smuggling: 3 battalions

=== Tactical SSM Missile Command Corps ===
1st and 2nd Brigades

- Five batteries of Battlefield range ballistic missile system FROG-7 (license built)
- Five batteries of Battlefield range ballistic missile system Sakr-80 (Indigenous built, based on Frog-7 design)
- Three batteries of Short-range ballistic missile System Scud-B (license built)
- Two batteries of Short-range ballistic missile System Scud-C (license built with North Korean assistance)
- 2 Batteries of Short-range ballistic missile System Project-T (indigenous built with Argentinian/French technology and North Korean assistance)
- 1 Battery of Short-range ballistic missile System Hwasong-6
- 1 Battery of Short-range ballistic missile System Al Badr 2000 (better known as an enhanced Scud-C variant) (Not the canceled Badr 2000/Condor 2 Project with Argentina)
- 1 Battery of Medium-range ballistic missile System Nodong-1
