= List of Egyptian commanders of the Yom Kippur War =

The October War, or the Tenth of Ramadan War, is also known in Syria as the Tishreen Liberation War, while Israel calls it the Yom Kippur War. It is the fourth Israeli war launched by Egypt and Syria against Israel on Saturday, October 6, 1973, corresponding to the 10th of Ramadan 1393 AH with a surprise attack by the Egyptian army and the Syrian army on the Israeli forces that were stationed in Sinai and the Golan Heights.

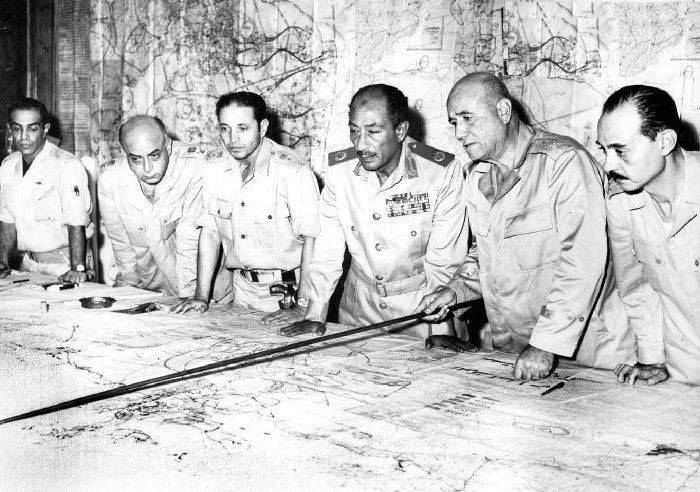
October War leaders in war operations room 1973.

On the Egyptian front: The Egyptian army achieved the desired strategic goals behind the military surprise of Israel. There were tangible achievements in the first days after the launch of the war, as Egyptian forces penetrated 20 km east of the Suez Canal. But at the end of the war, the Israeli army recovered and was able to initiate Operation Abirey-Halev, cross to the western bank of the canal, and impose a siege on the Third Field Army, but it failed to achieve any strategic gains, whether by controlling the city of Suez or the Third Army. During the war, many Arab countries helped Egypt and Syria, whether militarily or economically. Egypt decided to adhere to the Security Council resolution for a ceasefire on October 22, 1973, while Israel agreed on October 24. The first and second disengagement agreements were concluded. Then, after several discussions between Egypt and Israel, a comprehensive peace agreement was reached at Camp David in 1978.

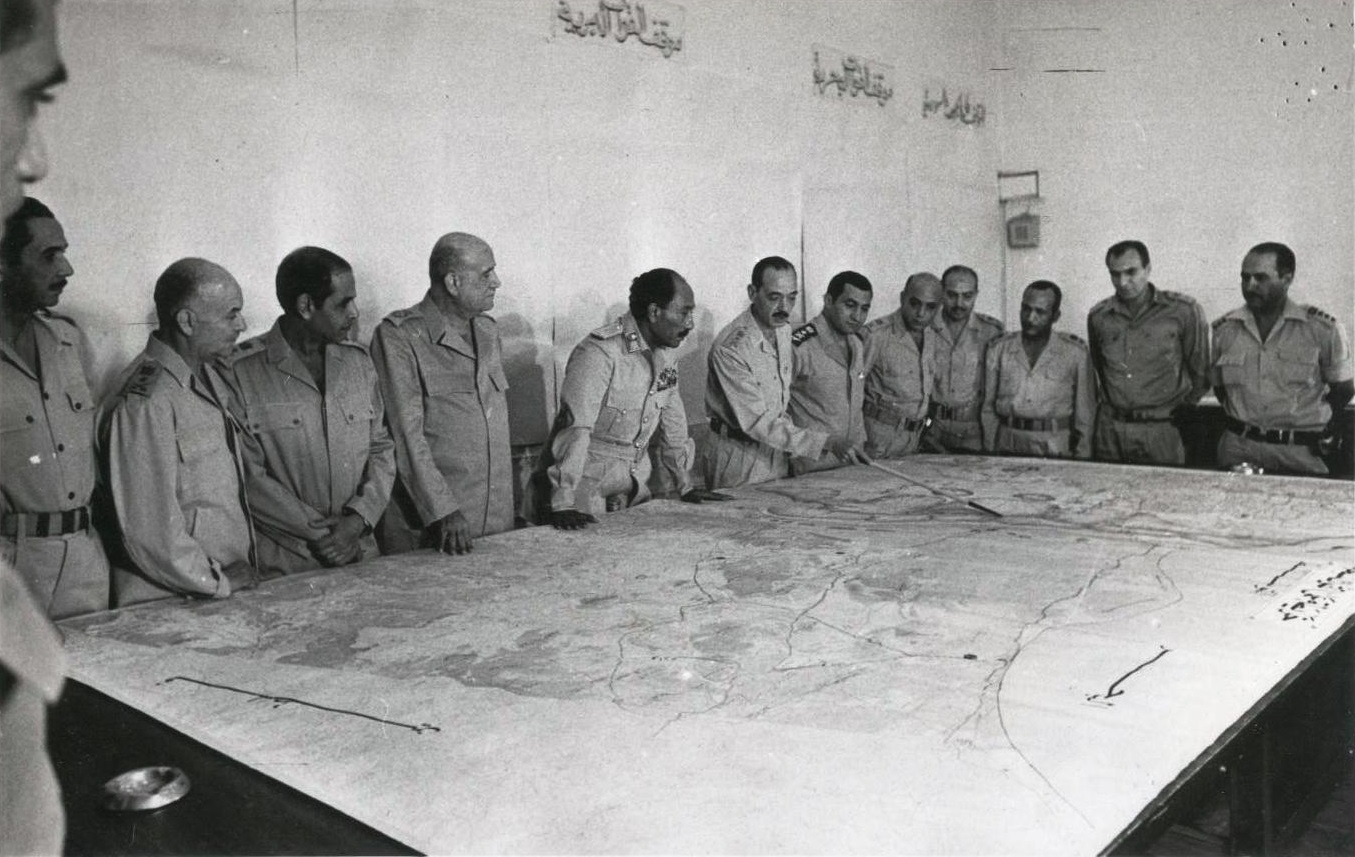
A photo of the Supreme Command of the Egyptian Armed Forces after the clashes stopped, February 1974

The Egyptian military leadership witnessed many changes after the Six-Day War of 1967 until before the October 1973 War:

- Ministry of War: Amin Howeidi took over the Ministry of War (July 21, 1967 - January 25, 1968), then General Mohamed Fawzi (January 25, 1968 - May 13, 1971) as a result of his resignation. Then Lieutenant General Mohammed Ahmed Sadek (May 14, 1971 - October 26, 1972) was referred for retirement, after which Lieutenant General Ahmad Ismail Ali took over on October 26, 1972, and assumed command of the army during the war until his death on December 25, 1974.
- Chief of Staff of the Egyptian Army: It was under the command of Lieutenant General Abdel Moneim Riad (June 11, 1967 - March 9, 1969), where he was martyred. Then Major General Ahmad Ismail Ali assumed the position (March 10, 1969 - September 10, 1969) but was referred for retirement following Operation Raviv incident. Then the position was held by Lieutenant General Mohammed Ahmed Sadek (September 10, 1969 - May 12, 1971). Then Lieutenant General Saad el-Din el-Shazly (May 16, 1971 - December 12, 1973) until he was dismissed to leave the position to Lieutenant-General Mohamed Abdel Ghani el-Gamasy (December 12, 1973 - 1974).
- Military Operations Authority: Major General Mohamed Abdel Ghani el-Gamasy (January 1, 1972 - December 12, 1973).
- Navy: Rear Admiral Mahmoud Abdel Rahman Fahmy (September 11, 1969 - October 24, 1972) was then referred for retirement and was replaced by Rear Admiral Fouad Mohamed Abou Zikry.
- Air forces: Major General Madkour Abu el-Ezz (June 11, 1967 - November 10, 1967), Air vice-marshal Mustafa el-Hanawi (November 10, 1967 - June 22, 1969), who was referred to retirement as a result of an Israeli air penetration over Cairo, then Air vice-marshal Ali Mustafa Baghdady until April 22, 1972, then he was dismissed and took over. He was replaced by Air vice-marshal Hosni Mubarak.
- Air Defense Forces: Major General Mohammed Aly Fahmy assumed the position of first commander of the Air Defense Forces.
- Military Intelligence: Major General Mohammed Ahmed Sadek, then Major General Mehrez Mustafa (October 24, 1972), was dismissed and then Major General Ibrahim Fouad Nassar assumed the position.

Below are the names of the Egyptian commanders who participated in the October War, knowing that:

- The military rank given is the same as it was during the October War only.
- The list is arranged according to the order and sequence of military units.

- Sources on the entire list.

== President of the Republic and Supreme Commander of the Armed Forces ==
Office	Name	Command held
Supreme Commander of the Egyptian Armed Forces	Anwar Sadat	President of Egypt

== Senior leadership of the armed forces ==
Rank	Name		Command held
Colonel general		Ahmad Ismail Ali	Commander-in-Chief of the Armed Forces and Minister of War, Commander-in-Chief of the Fronts (Egyptian, Syrian and Jordanian).
Lieutenant general		Saad el-Din el-Shazly	Chief of Staff of the Armed Forces (until December 12, 1973)
Major general	لاإطار	Mohamed Abdel Ghani el-Gamasy	Military Operations Authority (He assumed the position of Chief of Staff on December 12, 1973)
Rear Admiral		Fouad Mohamed Abou Zikry	Commander of the Navy
Air vice-marshal	Frameless	Hosni Mubarak	Commander of the Air Force
Major general	Frameless	Mohammed Aly Fahmy	Commander of the Air Defense Forces
Major general		Nawal el-Saeed	Head of the Logistics and Supplies Authority
Major general		Kamal Hassan Ali	Director of the Armored Corps
Major general	Frameless	Mohammed Saeed el-Mahi	Director of Artillery Corps
Major general		Ibrahim Fouad Nassar	Director of Military Intelligence
Major general	Frameless	Gamal Mohamed Ali	Director of the Corps of Military Engineers
Major general	Frameless	Mohammad Abdel Moneim Wakil	Director of Infantry Corps
Major general	Frameles	Nabil Shukri	Commander of El-Sa'ka Forces (special forces)
Brigadier general	Frameless	Mahmoud Abdullah	Commander of the Airborne Corps

== Commanders of military regions and sectors ==
Rank	Name		Command held	Notes
Major general	Frameless	Abdel Munim Khaleel	Commander of the Central Military Region	
Major general		Ibrahim Kamel Mohammad	Commander of the Red Sea Military Region	
Major general		Omar Khalid Hassan	Commander of the Port Said Military Sector	

== Bibliography ==
- Gamal, Hammad (2002). Military battles on the Egyptian front "المعارك الحربية على الجبهة المصرية" (ed. 2). Cairo, Egypt: Dar el-Shorouk. ISBN 977-09-0866-5.
