= Mahmoud Hegazy =

Egyptian general (born 1956)

- محمود حجازى
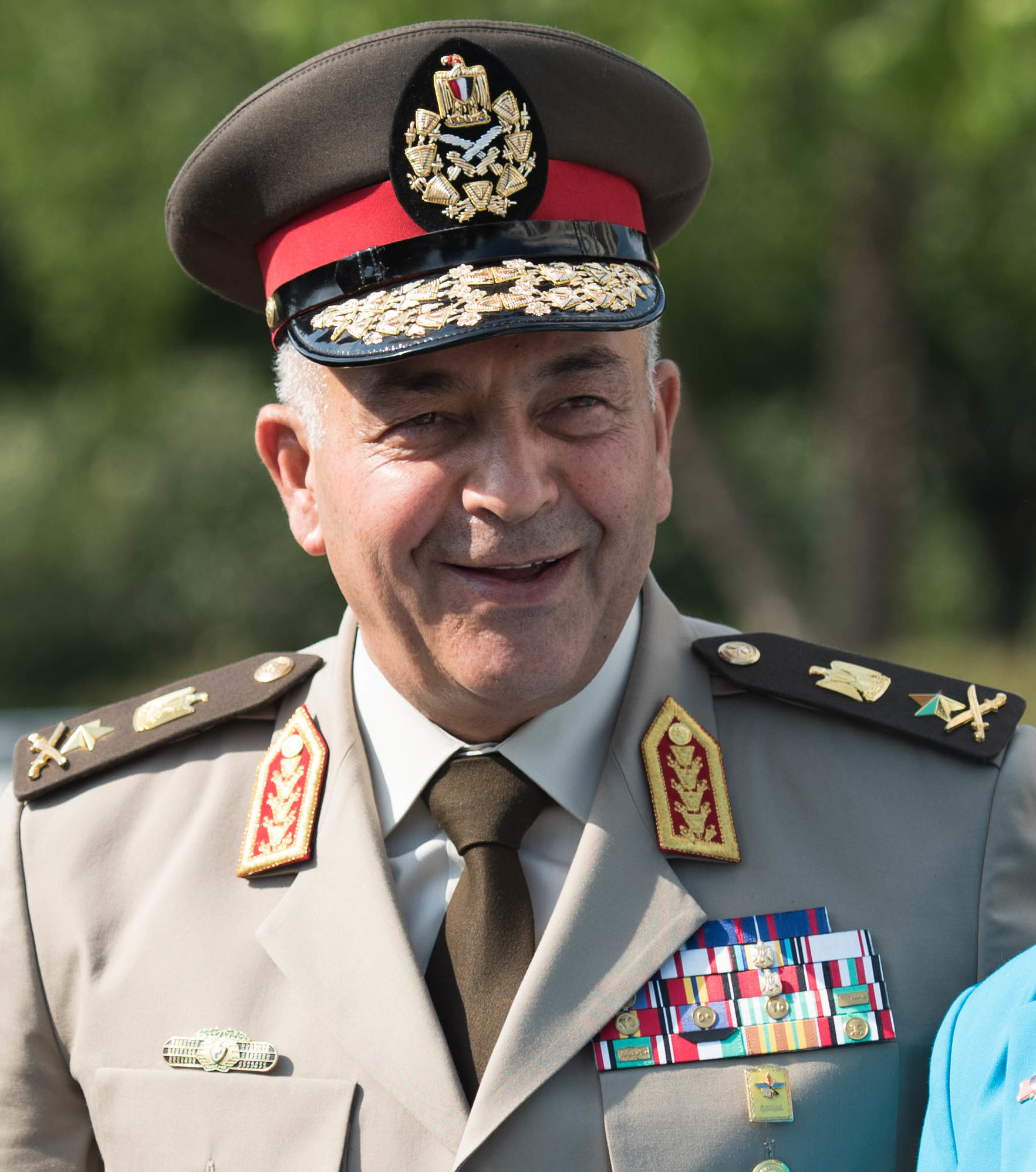

Chief of Staff of the Armed Forces
- In office 27 March 2014 – 28 October 2017
- President: Adly Mansour (Acting); Abdel Fattah el-Sisi
- Prime Minister: Ibrahim Mahlab
- Minister: Sedki Sobhi
- Preceded by: Sedki Sobhi
- Succeeded by: Mohammed Farid Hegazy

Director of the Military Intelligence and Reconnaissance
- In office 12 August 2012 – 27 March 2014
- President: Mohamed Morsi; Adly Mansour (Acting)
- Minister: Abdel Fattah el-Sisi
- Preceded by: Abdel Fattah el-Sisi
- Succeeded by: Salah Al-Badri

Personal details
- Born: 11 May 1956 (age 69)
- Awards: Awards and Decorations

Military service
- Allegiance: Egypt
- Branch/service: Egyptian Army
- Years of service: 1977–present
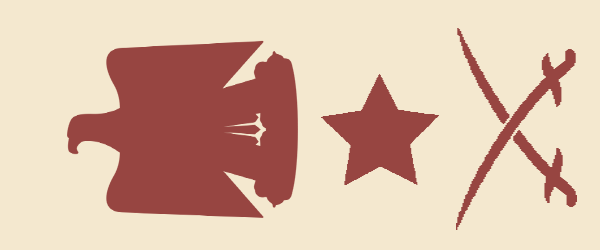
- Rank: Lieutenant General
- Unit: Armoured Corps
- Commands: Main Command positions
- Battles/wars: Gulf War; Sinai Insurgency; 2015 Egyptian military intervention in Libya; Intervention in Yemen

Mahmoud Ibrahim Mahmoud Hegazy (Egyptian Arabic: محمود إبراهيم محمود حجازى; born 11 May 1956) is an Egyptian general who was the Chief of Staff of the Egyptian Armed Forces from 2014 to 2017. Hegazy graduated from the Egyptian Military Academy in 1977, and served as the Chief of the Egyptian Military intelligence before his appointment as Chief of Staff by the president of Egypt, Abdel Fattah el-Sisi. He is related to Sisi through the marriage of their respective children.

Mahmoud Hegazy was replaced in 2017 by Mohammed Farid Hegazy in a shakeup of high level security personnel. No reason was given for the changes, but since 2013, Egypt has been fighting an ongoing Islamist insurgency that has killed of hundreds of policemen and soldiers. A week before the dismissal, sixteen policemen were killed during a police operation in the western desert of Giza province, and two high level security personnel for Giza were also dismissed. Hegazy was given a position of security advisor to the president. He is a member of the Supreme Council of the Armed Forces.

== Military education ==
- Bachelor of Military Sciences, Egyptian Military Academy
- The Advanced Course, Egyptian Military Academy
- The Sophisticated course, Egyptian Military Academy
- M.A. of Military sciences, Egyptian Joint Command and staff college
- War Course, Fellowship of the Higher War College, Nasser's Military Sciences Academy
- Advanced Armor course, USA

== Main commands ==
- Armored Battalion, commander
- Armored Brigade, Chief of staff
- Armored Brigade, commander
- Armored Division, Chief of staff
- Defense Attache, England
- Armored Division, commander
- Western Military Region, Chief of staff
- Western Military Region, commander
- Management and administration authority, Chief
- Military Intelligence, Chief

== Awards and decorations ==
- 25 April Decoration (Liberation of Sinai)
- Distinguished Service Decoration
- Military Duty Decoration, Third Class
- Military Duty Decoration, Second Class
- Military Duty Decoration, First Class
- Distinguished Tank Commanders Badge, First Class
- Longevity and Exemplary Medal
- Liberation of Kuwait Medal
- Silver Jubilee of October War Medal
- Golden Jubilee of the 23rd of July Revolution
- Silver Jubilee of the Liberation of Sinai Medal
- 25 January Revolution Medal

Family Abdelhamid Hegazi :son of Hegzai official Egypt delegate in the United Nations for 1999-2010, The milliliter president assistant 2014-2018 Omar Abdelhamid : Grandson of Mahmoud Hegazi, presidential delegate for Egypt 2030, First LGBTQI+ Activist from a diplomatic background in Egypt . Alaa Hegazi : Social security head 2016-2020, Husband of the president Abdelfattah el sisi daughter
