= Star Bright =

Star Bright or Starbright may refer to:

== Music ==
=== Albums ===
- Star Bright (Vanessa Williams album), 1996
- Star Bright (Dizzy Reece album), 1960
- Starbright (album), album by Pat Marino, 1976
- Starbright, album by Clare Fischer and Gary Foster, 1983
- Starbright, album by Linda Womack, 1986
- Starbright, album by Herbert Guðmundsson, 2018

=== Songs ===
- "Starbright" (song), a song by Johnny Mathis
- "Starbright", a song by Quietdrive from the album Deliverance
- "Starbright", a song by Keith Jarrett from the album Facing You
- "Starbright", a song by Peter McLean
- "Starbrite", a song by Jeff St John, 1985

== Organizations and groups ==
- Starbright World, an online community for children with chronic illnesses, developed by Starbright Foundation
- Miami Dolphins Starbrites, former name for the Miami Dolphins Cheerleaders
- Starbrite Cleaners, a fictional business from the television show Strip Mall
- Starbrite SC, a youth association football club started by Malaysian footballer R. Arumugam

== Other uses ==
- Starbright (film), a 2026 American fantasy film
- Jack Starbright, a character from the Alex Rider novels and television series
- Star Bright, a 1980 science-fiction novel by Martin Caidin.
- "Star Bright", a 1952 short story by Mark Clifton
- SS-N-7 Starbright, NATO reporting name for the P-70 Ametist anti-shipping missile

== See also ==
- Star Light, Star Bright, an English language nursery rhyme
- Apparent magnitude, a measurement of brightness of stars and astronomical objects as seen from Earth
- Bright Star (disambiguation)
- "Starbright Boy", a song by Bis from the album The New Transistor Heroes, 1997
