= Egyptian Armed Forces =

Combined military forces of Egypt

- القوات المسلحة المصرية (Arabic)

- Flags of the Egyptian Armed Forces
- Motto: Victory or Martyrdom
- Founded: 1820; 206 years ago
- Service branches: Egyptian Army (Note: Not a separate command, the land forces formations (armies and districts) are under the direct command of the Chief of Staff of the Armed Forces.); Egyptian Navy; Egyptian Air Force; Egyptian Air Defense Forces
- Headquarters: Kobri Al Quba, Cairo
- Website: www.mod.gov.eg/ModWebSite/

Leadership
- Supreme Commander: President Abdel Fattah el-Sisi
- Minister of Defense: Lieutenant General Ashraf Salem Zaher
- Chief of Staff: Lieutenant General Ahmed Fathy Khalifa

Personnel
- Military age: 18
- Conscription: 1–3 years depending on circumstances
- Active personnel: 438,500
- Reserve personnel: 479,000

Expenditure
- Budget: 2.5017 billion dollars (including 1.3 billion US aid)

Industry
- Domestic suppliers: Arab Organization for Industrialization; National Authority for Military Production; Alexandria Shipyard
- Foreign suppliers: Current: Brazil; China; Czech Republic; France; Germany; Italy; Poland Russia; South Africa; Ukraine; United Kingdom; United States; Former: Czechoslovakia; Soviet Union

Related articles
- History: List of engagements Alexandria expedition of 1807; Wahhabi War; Egyptian conquest of Sudan (1820–1824); Greek War of Independence; Egyptian-Ottoman War (1831-1833); Syrian Peasant Revolt (1834–1835); Ethiopian–Egyptian border conflict 1838 Druze Revolt; Egyptian-Ottoman War (1839-1841); Crimean War; Second French intervention in Mexico; Cretan Revolt (1866-1869); Egyptian invasion of the Eastern Horn of Africa; Serbian-Turkish Wars (1876-1878); Russo-Turkish War (1877-1878); Egyptian–Ethiopian War 'Urabi revolt Anglo-Egyptian War; Mahdist War; Anglo-Egyptian conquest of Sudan; World War I Anglo-Egyptian Darfur Expedition; 1919 Revolution of Egypt; World War II; 1948 Palestine War; Egyptian Revolution of 1952; Tripartite Aggression; North Yemen Civil War; Six-Day War; Nigerian Civil War; War of Attrition; October War; Shaba I Egyptian–Libyan War; 1986 Egyptian conscripts riot 1999 East Timorese crisis Gulf War; War on terror Egyptian revolution of 2011; 2013 Egyptian coup d'état Sinai insurgency Yemeni Civil War (2014–present); Egyptian involvement in the Second Libyan Civil War
- Ranks: Military ranks of Egypt

The Egyptian Armed Forces (Arabic: القوات المسلحة المصرية, romanized: Al-Qūwāt Al-Musallaḥah Al-Miṣrīyya) are the military forces of the Arab Republic of Egypt. The Chief of Staff of the Armed Forces directs (a) Egyptian Army forces, (b) the Egyptian Navy, (c) Egyptian Air Force and (d) Egyptian Air Defense Forces. The Chief of Staff directly supervises army field forces (armies and districts), without any separate Egyptian Army headquarters.

Since the 1952 Egyptian revolution that led to the overthrow of the monarchy, Egypt's military has centralized Egypt's governance and dominated its politics and economy. Senior members of the military can convene the Supreme Council of the Armed Forces, such as during the course of the 2011 Egyptian revolution, when President Mubarak resigned and transferred power to this body on February 11, 2011.

The Commander-in-Chief of the Armed Forces directs all branches, forces, armies, regions, bodies, agencies and departments of the Armed Forces. The Commander-in-Chief simultaneously holds the position of Minister of Defence. Since July 2024, General Abdel Mageed Saqr has been Commander-in-Chief of the Armed Forces; Minister of Defense; and Military Production. The only person above him in the leadership ladder is the Supreme Commander of the Armed Forces, who is the President of the Republic, and this position is currently held by Abdel Fattah el-Sisi. The Chief of Staff is Lieutenant General Ahmed Fathy Khalifa (since July 2024). The Supreme Council of the Armed Forces consists of 23 members, headed by the Commander-in-Chief and Minister of Defense, and represented by the Chief of Staff of the Armed Forces, with membership of: Commanders of the main branches of air, navy, and air defense, commanders of the border guard forces, commanders of the armies (Second and Third), and commanders of the military regions (Central, Northern, Western and Southern) and the heads of the Operations, Armament, Logistics and Supply, Engineering, Training, Financial Affairs, Military Justice, Management and Administration, the directors of the Officers Affairs and Military Intelligence departments, the Assistant Minister of Defense for Constitutional and Legal Affairs, and the Secretary of the Council is the Secretary-General of the Ministry of Defense.

The armament of the Egyptian armed forces varies between eastern and western sources through weapons deliveries by several countries, led by the United States, Russia, France, China, Italy, Ukraine and Britain. Much of the equipment is manufactured locally at Egyptian factories. The Egyptian armed forces celebrate their anniversary on October 6 each year to commemorate the Crossing of the Suez during the October War of 1973.

The modern Egyptian armed forces have been involved in many wars and crises since independence, including the 1948 Arab–Israeli War, Egyptian Revolution of 1952, Suez Crisis, North Yemen Civil War, Six-Day War, Nigerian Civil War, War of Attrition, Yom Kippur War, Egyptian bread riots, 1986 Egyptian conscripts riot, Egyptian-Libyan War, Gulf War, war on terror, Egyptian Crisis, Second Libyan Civil War, War on ISIL and the Sinai insurgency.

== History ==
=== Nineteenth century ===
The modern Egyptian military was established by Muhammad Ali during his consolidation of power in Egypt, which reduced Ottoman influence and helped make Egypt an autonomous vassal of the Ottoman Empire and effectively a de facto independent state.

In the early 19th century, Muhammad Ali of Egypt undertook comprehensive military reforms aimed at establishing a centralized, European-style army capable of securing his territorial ambitions and consolidating his authority over Egypt and beyond. Though his initial campaigns, such as those in Arabia and Greece, were formally conducted on behalf of the Ottoman Empire, Muhammad Ali progressively distanced himself from the Sublime Porte and expanded Egypt's military power through independent campaigns.

Central to his military project was the reorganization of the Egyptian army along modern lines. Recruits were placed under strict discipline and surveillance within newly constructed barracks, subject to multiple daily roll calls and corporal punishment, including the use of the bastinado and whipping. Military regulations and codes of conduct were developed to ensure obedience and uniform discipline, while new administrative practices introduced standardized record-keeping, personal identification numbers for soldiers, and hierarchical unit structures. These measures facilitated internal control, particularly in deterring desertion during forced marches or redeployment.

Initially, Muhammad Ali relied on Bedouin groups to monitor troops at training camps, but tensions soon arose, prompting a shift toward a system of internment and self-contained oversight within military facilities. His reforms extended to logistical administration, including the centralization of salaries, distinctions between officers and enlisted men, and the formalization of career military service.

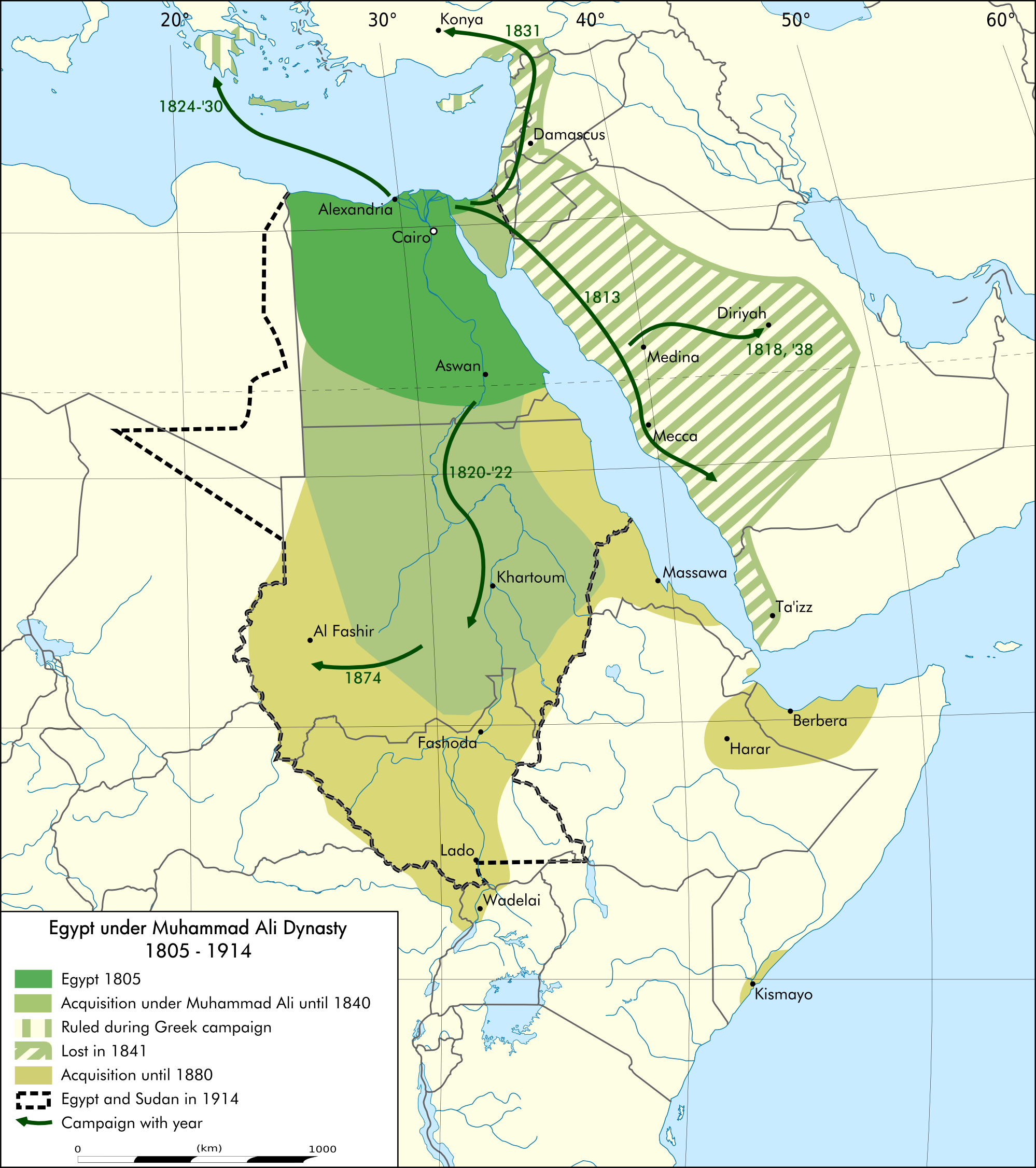
Map of Egypt under Muhammad Ali Dynasty

These internal reforms laid the foundation for a series of expansionist campaigns. In 1811, Muhammad Ali launched a campaign into the Arabian Peninsula to suppress the First Saudi State, recapturing the Hejaz region and eventually defeating the House of Saud after a prolonged campaign led by his sons, Tusun Pasha and Ibrahim Pasha. This was followed by the Turco-Egyptian conquest of Sudan (1820–1824), in which Egyptian forces subdued fragmented tribal entities, establishing Egyptian authority in the region and creating a new source of conscripts and slaves for the Egyptian army, including the formation of the Gihadiya foot regiments.

Muhammad Ali also participated in the suppression of the Greek War of Independence on behalf of the Ottomans, deploying a large expeditionary force under Ibrahim Pasha. Despite early advances, the Egyptian navy was decisively defeated at the Battle of Navarino (1827) by a coalition of European powers, costing Egypt its fleet and forcing withdrawal.

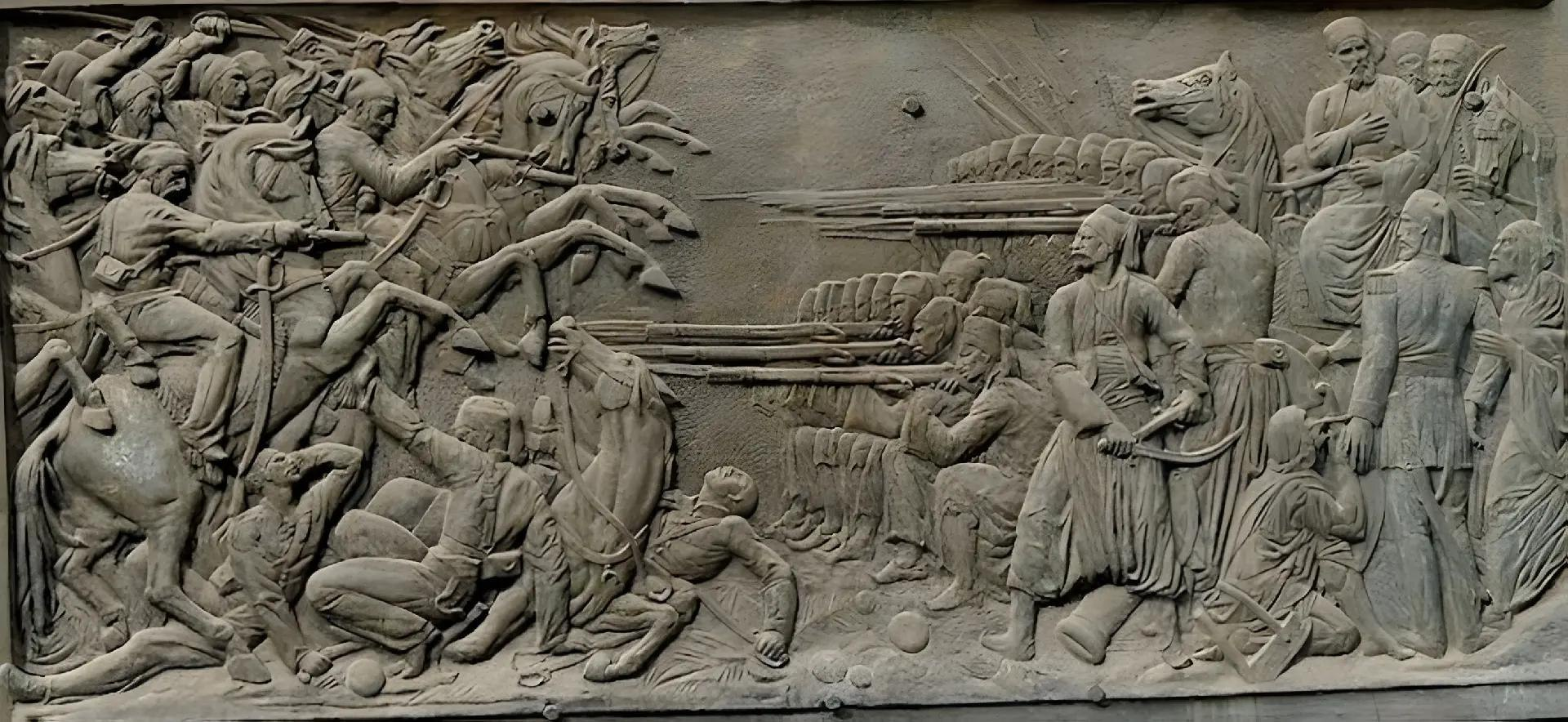
Illustration of the Battle of Konya.

From 1831 to 1840, Muhammad Ali engaged in two major wars against the Ottoman Empire, seeking to annex Syria and eventually challenge Ottoman sovereignty. His forces captured much of the Levant and advanced into Anatolia, winning major victories such as the Battle of Konya (1832) and Battle of Nezib (1839). However, sustained pressure from the European powers led to diplomatic intervention and the signing of the Convention of London (1840). Under its terms, Muhammad Ali was forced to relinquish control of most of his conquests in exchange for recognition of hereditary rule over Egypt and Sudan, which laid the groundwork for Egypt's de facto autonomy within the Ottoman Empire.

Under Muhammad Ali's successors, the military remained central to the state but faced constraints. During the reign of Abbas I and Sa'id Pasha, modernization slowed, although limited reforms were introduced, including early railway construction and the beginning of land and labor reforms.

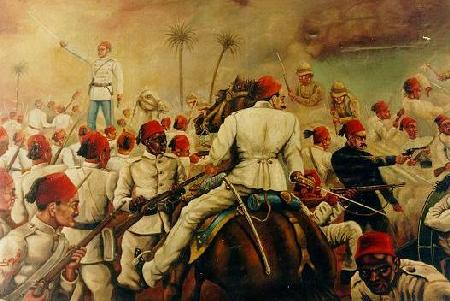
Egyptian soldiers during the Anglo-Egyptian War.

The most ambitious military and infrastructural expansions occurred under Ismail Pasha, who restructured the military academies, supported public works, and briefly pursued naval modernization, ordering ironclads and expanding the military's logistical capabilities. Egypt's military also played a role in territorial expansion, particularly in Sudan and Darfur. However, this coincided with fiscal mismanagement and rising foreign debt, leading to increasing European oversight, culminating in the sale of Egyptian shares in the Suez Canal Company to Britain in 1879.

Dissatisfaction with foreign influence, combined with longstanding grievances among Egyptian officers, culminated in the Urabi Revolt (1881–1882), led by Ahmed ‘Urabi. Originally sparked by resentment against favoritism toward officers of Turkish origin, the movement evolved into a broader nationalist uprising. Despite initial military resistance, Urabi's forces were ultimately defeated by the British Army at the Battle of Tel-el-Kebir, leading to the de facto British occupation of Egypt. Though nominally autonomous, Egypt effectively became a British protectorate until the unilateral declaration of independence in 1922.

=== Twentieth century ===
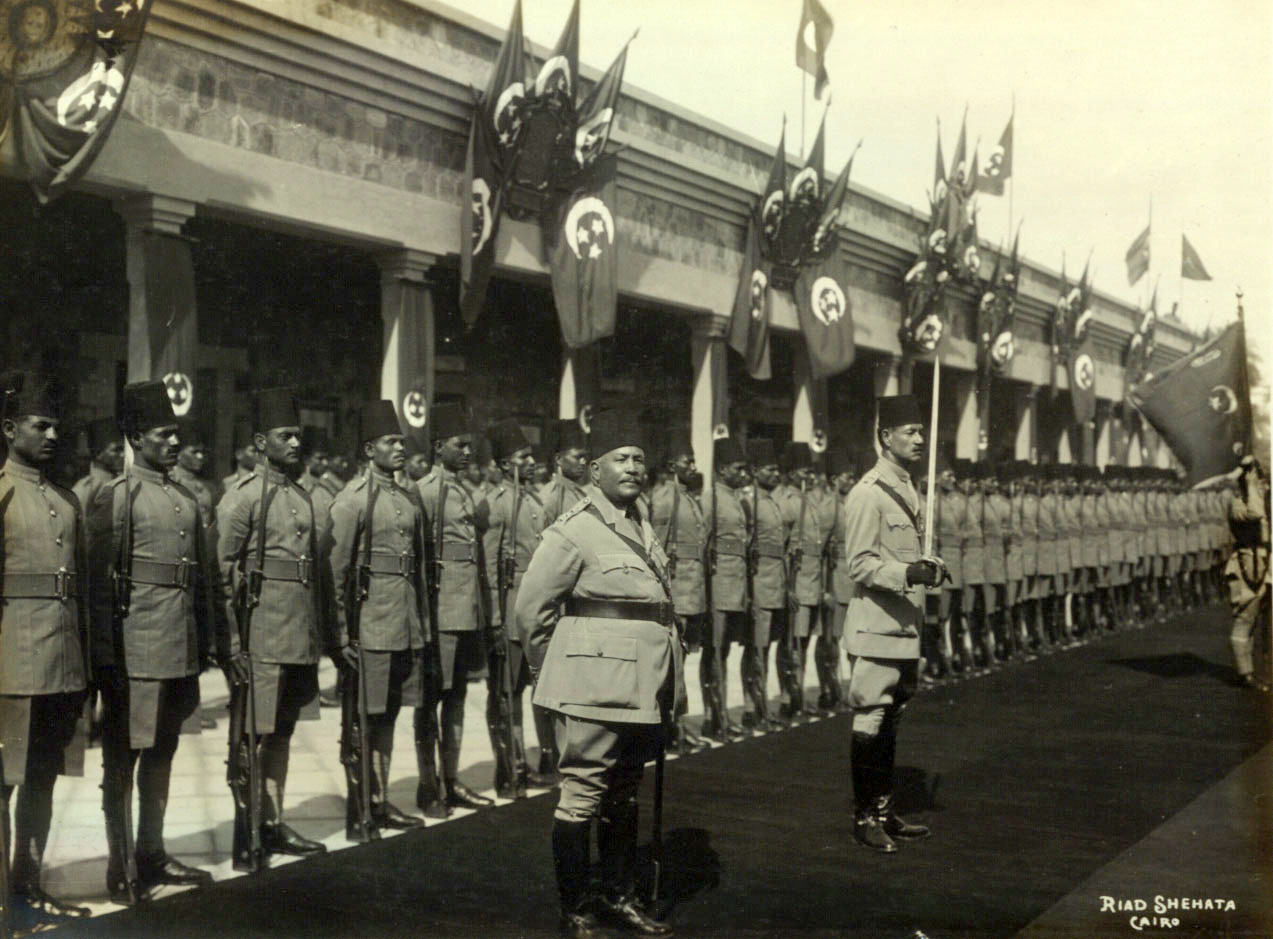
Egyptian infantry form honor guard, 1926

By 1914, the Egyptian military functioned largely as a native home-defence and colonial garrison force. It was organized and equipped under British supervision and staffed primarily with British officers. Its structure included infantry battalions, mounted infantry, camel corps units, support services, and irregular militia components.

The 1922 declaration of Egyptian independence formally ended the British protectorate but still left Egypt's sovereignty constrained, particularly in military affairs. Britain retained control over Egypt's defense, foreign relations, and Sudan, effectively limiting Egypt's autonomy and perpetuating British military presence and influence. Although the declaration ended the legal fiction of Ottoman rule and met some nationalist demands, it failed to satisfy broader aspirations for full sovereignty. The resulting frustrations over continued British dominance, especially regarding the military, fueled further nationalist opposition and anti-British sentiment.

The Egyptian Air Force was initially established in 1930 as the Egyptian Army Air Force and formally inaugurated in 1932. In 1937, it was separated from army command and reorganized as an independent service under the name Royal Egyptian Air Force, becoming the third branch of the Egyptian military after the army and navy.

During World War I, Egypt's strategic importance increased significantly due to the threat posed by Ottoman incursions across the Sinai. Although such offensives were ultimately repulsed, Egyptian forces remained focused primarily on internal security and regional garrison duties, especially in Sudan. By 1917, approximately 15,000 Egyptian volunteers were serving in the regular military, while over 98,000 Egyptians served in logistical capacities through the Egyptian Labour Corps and Egyptian Camel Transport Corps.

In the interwar period, although military service was technically compulsory, the armed forces remained limited in size and scope. By 1939, the total strength was modest, and British oversight remained extensive. Under the Anglo-Egyptian Treaty of 1936, Britain retained the right to station troops in Egypt for the protection of the Suez Canal and continued to exert influence over training and operations.

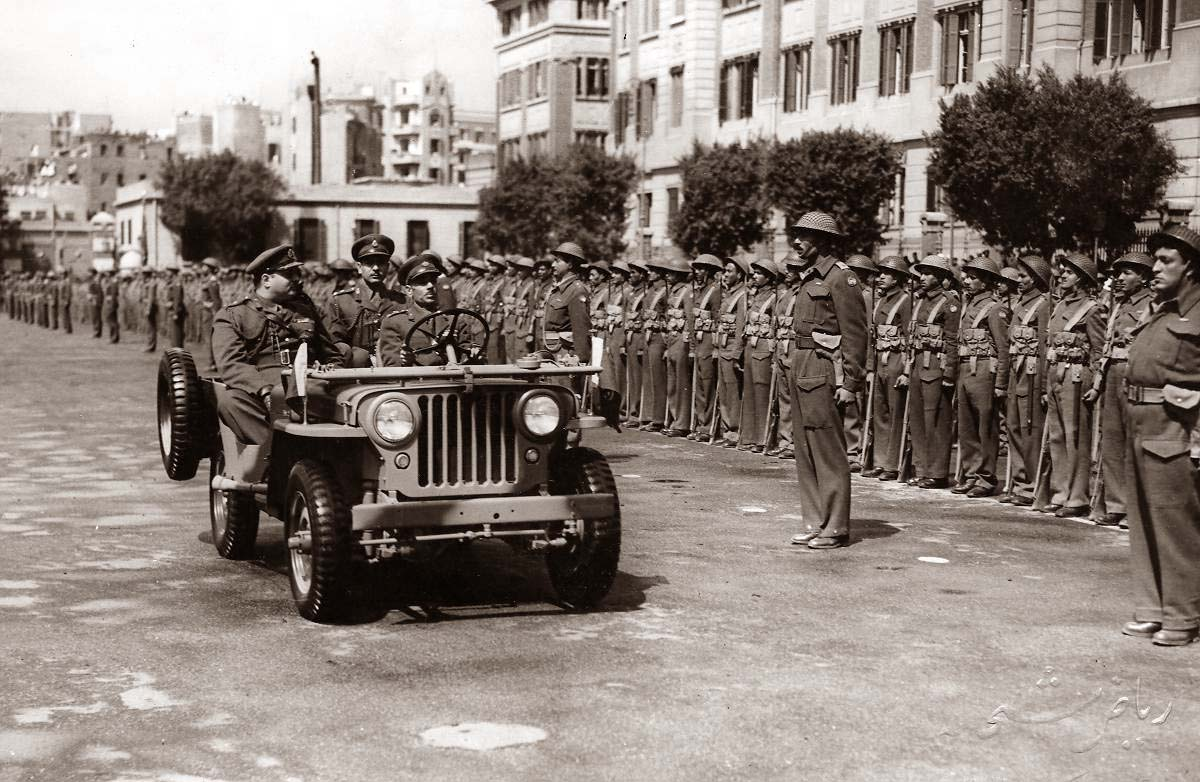
King Farouk I inspecting soldiers in 1942

At the onset of the World War II, Egypt's military capacity remained limited. Following the Italian invasion of western Egypt in 1940, Egypt broke relations with the Axis powers and increasingly aligned itself with British military operations. While Egypt's forces were not the primary combatants, they contributed to British-led operations, including in the Western Desert campaign. Axis forces under General Erwin Rommel made temporary advances into Egyptian territory before being repelled at the Second Battle of El Alamein.

By the late 1940s, internal dissatisfaction with military leadership was growing. Many younger officers, particularly those educated in Britain, became disillusioned with the entrenched senior command, which was perceived as corrupt and incompetent, accusations heightened by Egypt's poor performance in the 1948 Arab–Israeli War. Although a partial purge of the senior officer corps was carried out in 1950, many of the dismissed officers were later reinstated by royal decree, further fueling discontent within the ranks.

In an effort to assert greater independence and reduce British influence, King Farouk dismissed the British Military Mission in 1950 and invited former German Wehrmacht officers, including Generals Wilhelm Fahrmbacher and Oskar Munzel, to serve as advisors to the Egyptian military establishment. These advisors remained in the country until 1958.

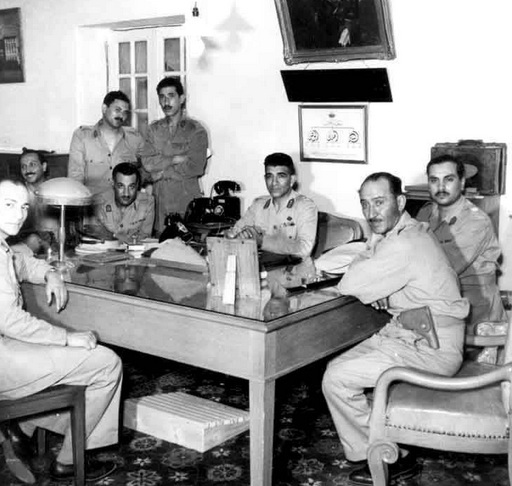
The Free Officers in 1953, a year after toppling the monarchy

The Egyptian military's failure in the 1948 Arab–Israeli War was a catalyst for the formation of the Free Officers led by Muhammad Naguib and Gamal Abdel Nasser. In the Egyptian coup d'état of 1952, they overthrew King Farouk and initiated sweeping reforms within the military and state.

One of the early achievements of the new regime was the signing of the Anglo–Egyptian Agreement of 1954, which mandated the phased withdrawal of British forces from the Suez Canal zone. The agreement allowed for continued British access to the base under specific circumstances and stipulated complete withdrawal by June 1956.

In 1956, the Egyptian Armed Forces were thrust into a major international conflict during the Suez Crisis, also known as the Tripartite Aggression. The crisis erupted after President Gamal Abdel Nasser revoked the concession of the Anglo-French owned Suez Canal Company and transferred canal operation to the state-owned Suez Canal Authority, prompting a coordinated military response from Israel, the United Kingdom, and France. On 29 October, Israeli forces invaded the Sinai Peninsula, followed days later by Anglo-French landings in the Canal Zone. The stated aim was to separate the combatants and secure freedom of navigation through the canal, but the operation was widely perceived as a ploy to topple Nasser and restore Western control over the vital waterway.

In the early 1950s, particularly after the revolution of 1952, politics rather than military competence was the main criterion for promotion. Field Marshal Abdel Hakim Amer in particular was a purely political appointment, whose approach would lead to large-scale problems during the Suez War. Promotions were often based on loyalty rather than merit, and a rigid divide between officers and enlisted men contributed to widespread dysfunction. Although some Egyptian defensive positions, such as at Abu Agelia and Mitla Pass, were organized and offered resistance, the Israeli forces quickly seized the initiative and routed Egyptian positions across the Sinai. Nasser ordered a general withdrawal from the peninsula, which allowed Israeli troops to advance rapidly toward the Suez Canal.

The invasion was soon halted under intense international pressure. The United States, Soviet Union, and United Nations condemned the attack, forcing a ceasefire by 7 November. Although Egypt suffered tactical defeats, the crisis ultimately elevated Nasser's stature in the Arab world and signaled the decline of British and French influence in the Middle East. The conflict exposed deep structural weaknesses and damaged the armed forces' reputation, but the political outcome was widely seen as a strategic victory for Egypt.

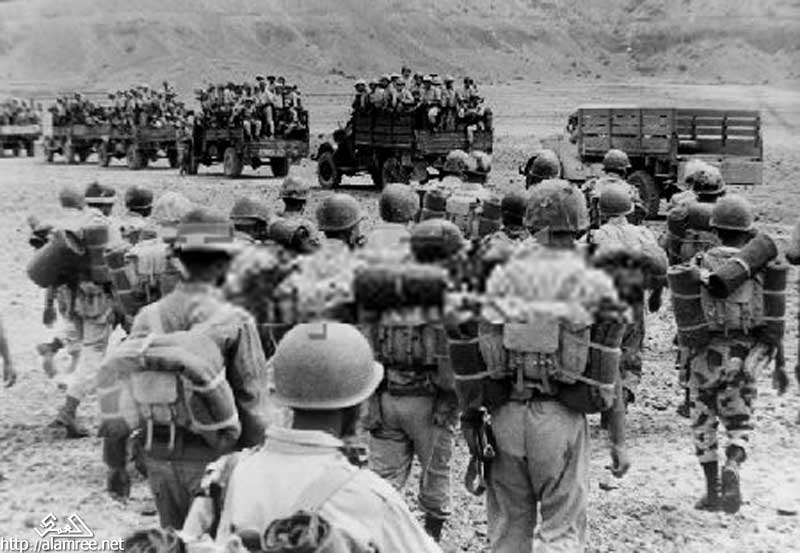
An Egyptian armored column in Yemen, 1962

During the North Yemen Civil War that began in 1962, the Egyptian Armed Forces undertook one of their most extensive foreign deployments, dispatching tens of thousands of troops in support of republican forces against the royalists backed by Saudi Arabia, Jordan, and Israel. "In addition to Egyptian aid, the Soviet Union supplied 24 MiG-19s to the republicans." Authorized by President Gamal Abdel Nasser, the campaign involved sustained aerial and ground operations with Soviet support. Within months of the initial deployment in 1962, Nasser recognized that the campaign would demand far more than anticipated and sought a face-saving exit strategy, but the scope of engagement continued to escalate.

Fewer than 5,000 troops were initially deployed in October 1962, rising to 15,000 by December, 36,000 by late 1963, and 50,000 by late 1964. The peak came in late 1965, with approximately 55,000 personnel divided across 13 infantry regiments, an artillery division, a tank division from the Egyptian Armoured Corps, and multiple Special Forces and airborne regiments. Egyptian field commanders reported logistical constraints, notably the absence of reliable topographical maps during the early phase of operations. The prolonged and resource-intensive conflict strained Egypt's military capabilities and readiness, and left it vulnerable ahead of Israel's invasion in 1967.

In the period leading up to the Six-Day War in 1967, the Egyptian Armed Forces were organized into four regional military commands, Suez, Sinai, the Nile Delta, and the Nile Valley up to the border with Sudan, while the remaining 75 percent of Egypt's territory fell under the exclusive jurisdiction of the Frontier Corps. Tensions escalated in May 1967 when President Gamal Abdel Nasser announced the closure of the Straits of Tiran to Israeli shipping, an action Israel interpreted as a casus belli and responded to by mobilizing its forces.

In response, Egypt deployed three battalions of commandos to Amman in coordination with Jordan on 3 June. According to historian Trevor N. Dupuy, drawing on the memoirs of King Hussein of Jordan, Nasser's intent was not to initiate a war but to achieve political and rhetorical leverage. Nevertheless, Israel proceeded with military action on 5 June.

At the time, the Egyptian Army had seven divisions positioned in the Sinai, two armored and five infantry, under the newly established Sinai Front Command, led by General Abdel Mohsin Murtagi, who had recently returned from Yemen. In the weeks before the outbreak of hostilities, Field Marshal Abdel Hakim Amer implemented wide-ranging changes to the command structure, replacing both the commanders and chiefs of staff in six of the seven divisions. Scholars such as Kenneth Pollack argue that these changes aimed to enhance operational effectiveness by placing veterans of the Yemeni conflict in key leadership roles.

On the morning of 5 June, Israel launched a coordinated military offensive, targeting Egyptian airbases and achieving a substantial degradation of Egypt's air power early in the conflict. Ground forces soon advanced into the Sinai Peninsula, where Egyptian units faced mounting pressure across several fronts. Amid the deteriorating situation, Field Marshal Amer issued an order for a general withdrawal to the Suez Canal. The execution of this withdrawal, conducted under fire and without coherent coordination, contributed to considerable disruption among Egyptian forces, who sustained further losses during the retreat.

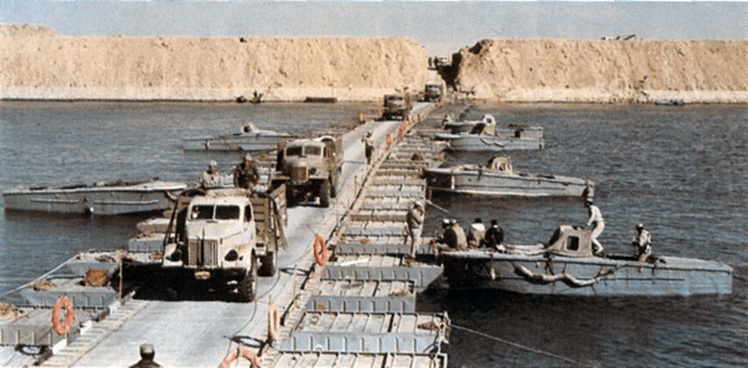
Egyptian military vehicles crossing the Suez Canal over one of the bridgeheads during Operation Badr.

In July 1972, President Anwar Sadat expelled Soviet Armed Forces advisors from Egypt. On 6 October 1973, during the Yom Kippur holiday, which coincided with the 10th day of Ramadan, Egypt and Syria launched a surprise offensive to recover occupied territory, initiating the October War. In the Sinai, Egyptian forces crossed the Suez Canal as part of Operation Badr and established positions on the eastern bank, which it held throughout the conflict. On 14 October, Egyptian forces advanced deeper into the peninsula to relieve pressure on the Syrian front; however, the Israelis halted this offensive after three days. Seizing the initiative, Israeli forces crossed the canal through a single crossing point at Deversoir, cleared during the Battle of the Chinese Farm, and proceeded to advance north toward Ismailia and Port Said to isolate the Egyptian Second Army, south toward Suez to isolate the Third Army, and westward towards Cairo but were held at Nefalia. They encountered fierce resistance on all fronts and Israel suffered a major setback northwards at the Battle of Ismailia. A UN-brokered ceasefire took effect on 22 October, only to collapse soon after amid mutual accusations of violations. When hostilities resumed, Israel managed to achieve a breakthrough southward, effectively threatening the Third Army's supply lines, but was ultimately unable to capture Suez despite multiple attempts. A second ceasefire on 25 October ended the fighting.

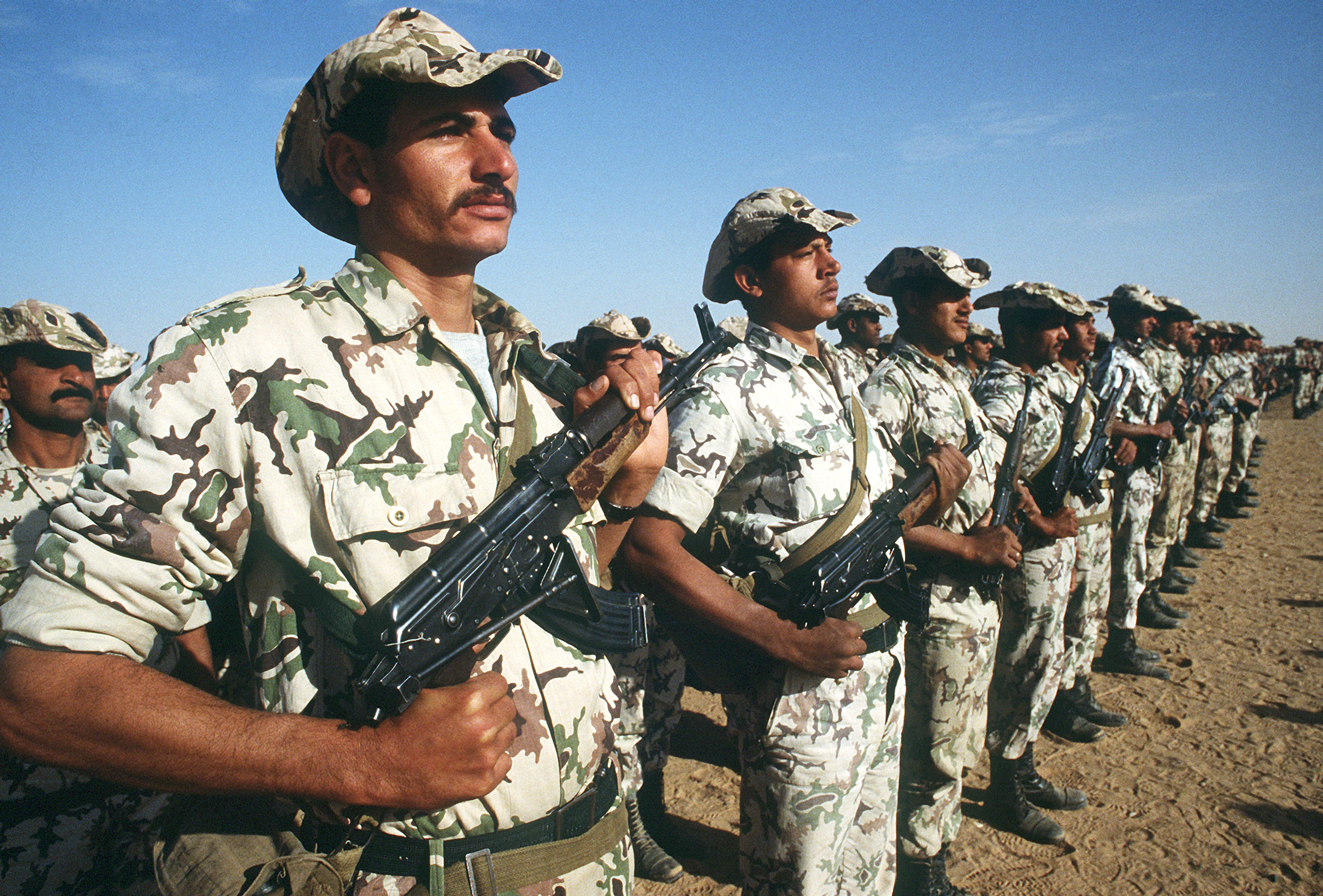
Egyptian soldiers in the Gulf War

When Sadat and the Israelis concluded the Camp David Accords in September 1978, part of the quid pro quo for Egypt's acceptance of peace was the provision of substantial U.S. military assistance. Today, the U.S. provides an annual assistance package often quoted at a nominal $1.3 billion to the Egyptian Armed Forces. This level is second only to that provided to Israel.

Scholars such as Kenneth Pollack, DeAtkine, and Robert Springborg have proposed multiple explanations for the challenges that Arab (and Egyptian) armies encountered in conflicts with Israel from 1948 through the 1970s and beyond. In particular, they suggest that from 1948 onward, junior officers often exhibited limited willingness to manoeuvre, innovate, or act independently. Ground forces units reportedly struggled with manipulation of information and insufficient attention to intelligence gathering and unbiased analysis. Observers note that elements from two Egyptian divisions sent to Saudi Arabia in 1990–91, accompanied by U.S. personnel during the 1991 Gulf War, frequently reported intense combat despite facing minimal or no resistance, whether or not U.S. military personnel or journalists were present. Later studies, such as those by Springborg, indicate that these patterns continued within the Egyptian Armed Forces into the twenty-first century.

=== Twenty-first century ===
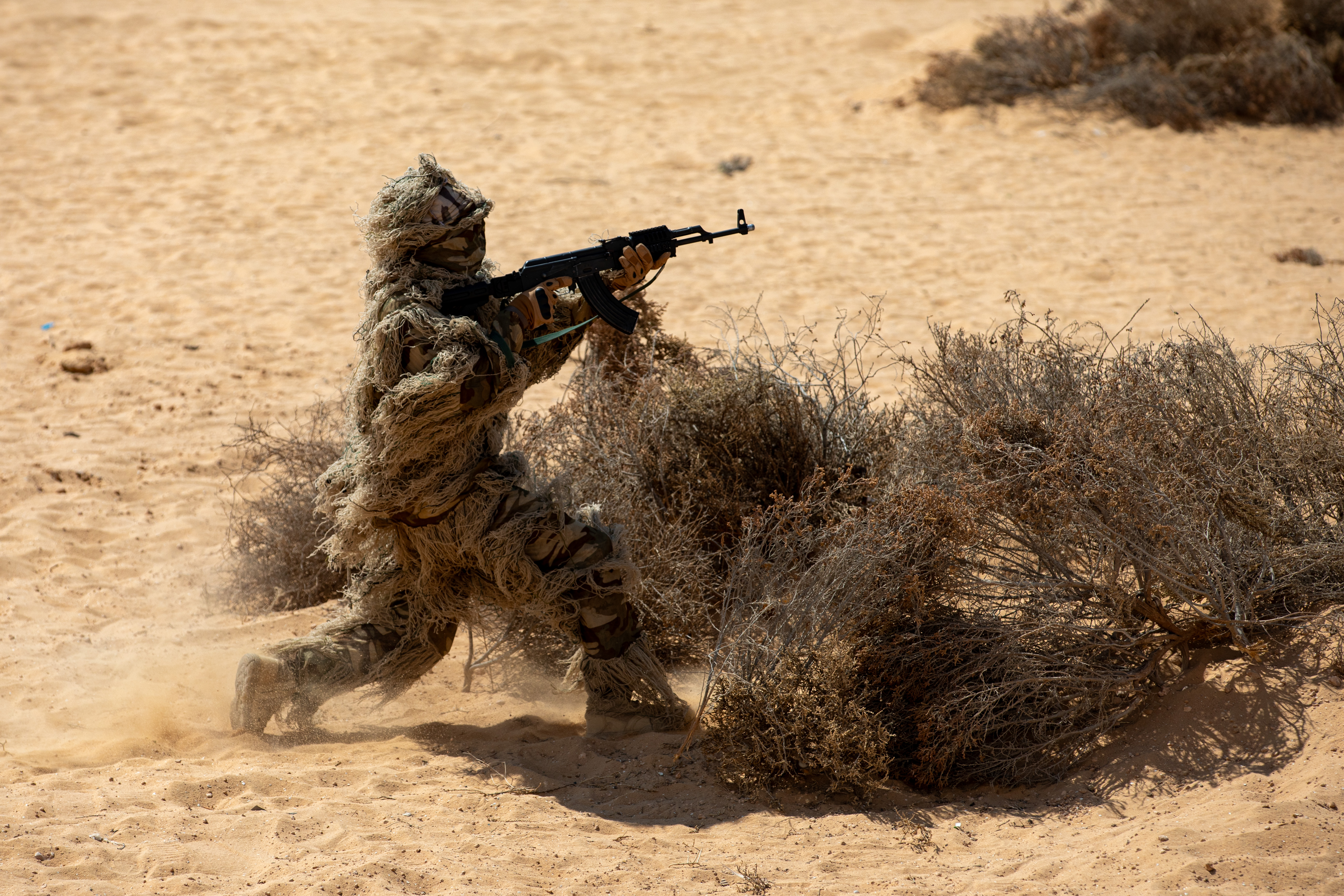
An Egyptian soldier during a military exercise at Mohamed Naguib Military Base

During the 2011 Egyptian revolution, the Egyptian Army was deployed to restore order in major cities. On 31 January 2011, Israeli media reported that the 9th, 2nd, and 7th Divisions were ordered into Cairo. Subsequently, on 3 July 2013, the Armed Forces removed President Mohamed Morsi from office following mass protests demanding his resignation, an action widely described as a coup d’état. In the days that followed, several violent incidents occurred, including the Republican Guard headquarters clashes on 8 July 2013, which resulted in the deaths of 61 protesters. On 14 August 2013, security forces, including the army and police, carried out the dispersal of pro-Morsi sit-ins at Rabaa and Nahda Squares, resulting in large-scale casualties. Estimates of the death toll vary, with some reports stating over 2,600 fatalities. The events of 14 August 2013 are considered the deadliest day in Egypt since the 2011 revolution. The international response included widespread condemnation from foreign governments and human rights organizations.

Since the 2013 Egyptian coup d'etat, the Egyptian Armed Forces has maintained a prominent role within the state, enjoying a high degree of institutional autonomy and influence across multiple sectors. The military also holds a substantial presence in the economy, participating in areas such as infrastructure, housing, consumer goods, and tourism, and possesses large real estate holdings. Information regarding its budget, leadership, and force size remains largely undisclosed. The exact size of the Armed Forces "is considered a state secret."

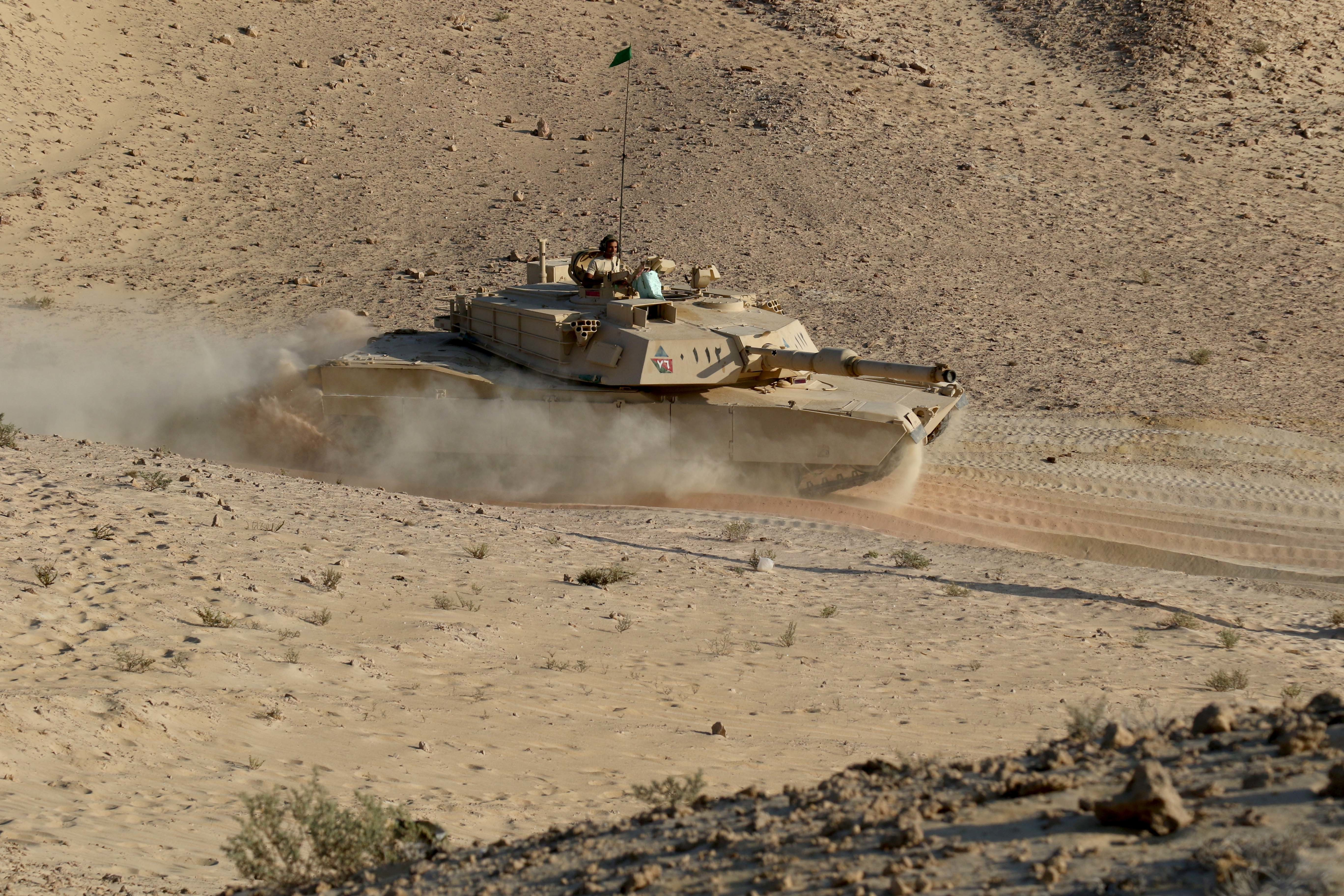
An Egyptian M1 Abrams tank

Estimates of the military's economic reach vary; journalist Joshua Hammer reported that the armed forces may control up to 40% of the Egyptian economy, though such figures have been criticized for lacking empirical foundations and for rarely being grounded in systematic analysis. These estimates often fail to distinguish between different forms of military economic engagement, such as the annual output of goods and services versus ownership of physical assets. They also tend to conflate three distinct domains of economic involvement: formally registered military-owned enterprises under the Ministry of Military Production, the Arab Organization for Industrialization, and other affiliated agencies whose actual production is significantly more modest than often portrayed; a wider group of public and private sector entities led or influenced by retired military officers, whose revenues do not belong to the armed forces; and regulatory privileges that generate income through licensing, leasing, tolls, and partnerships with national and international firms.

In 2016, President Abdel Fattah el-Sisi and military officials estimated that the formal military economy accounted for between 1% and 2% of Egypt's GDP, which likely covers the combined output of military agencies and revenues from public works. According to Yezid Sayigh, senior fellow at the Carnegie Middle East Center, this estimate is likely closer to the actual scale of the military's formal economic activity. While the military has expanded its access to extra-budgetary resources and assumed a growing role in state capital expenditure since 2013, analysts argue that its economic footprint is generally smaller, less efficient, and less productive than widely believed, though still of considerable significance.

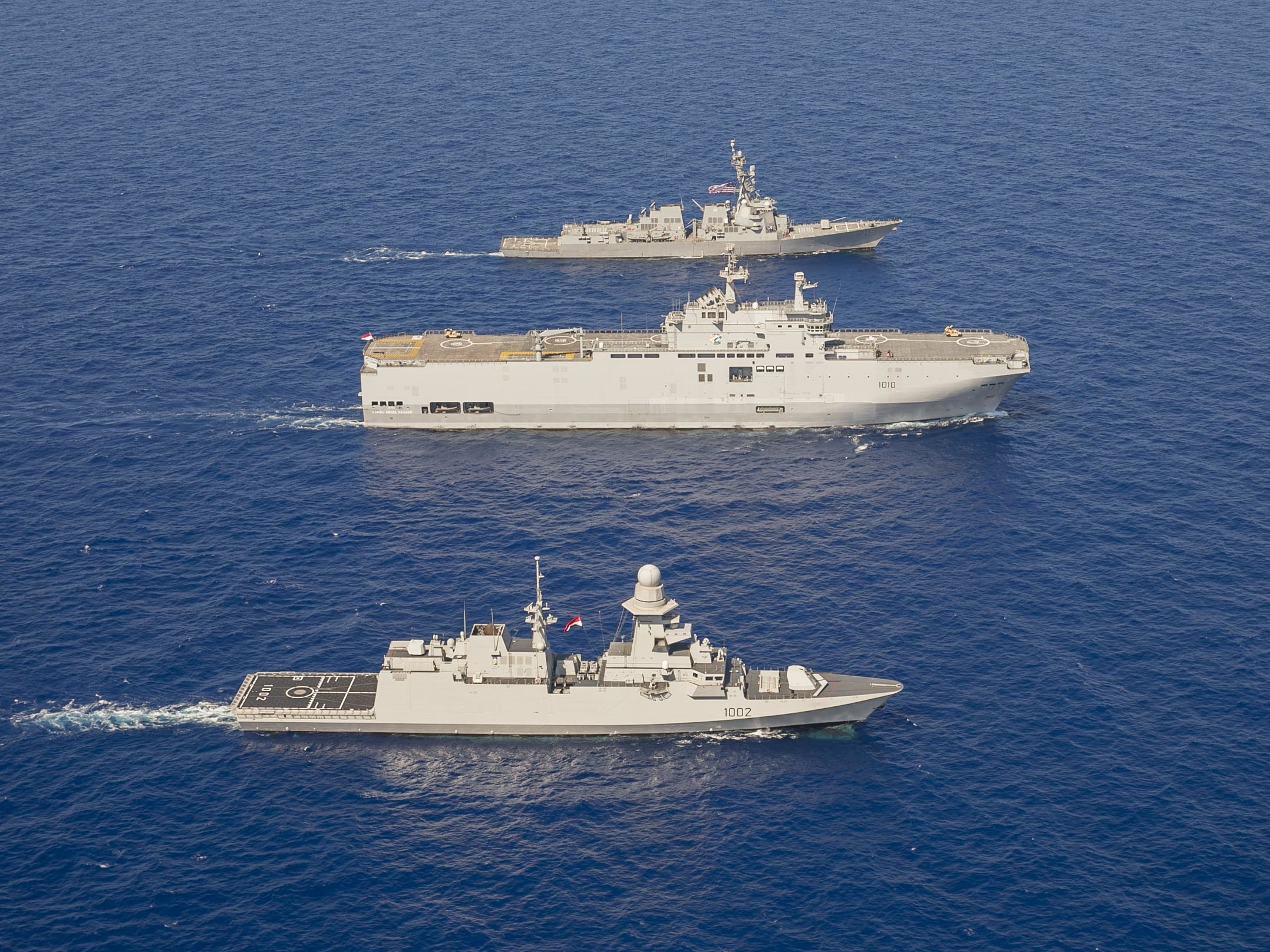
Egyptian Mistral class ENS Gamal Abdel Nasser (middle) sails alongside ENS Al-Galala (bottom) and American USS Delbert D. Black (top) and in the Mediterranean Sea, 29 August 2022, during joint operations to enhance regional maritime security.

By 2018, analysts observed no overt signs of institutional fragmentation within the Armed Forces. According to Hussein and Martino, the military's entrenched dominance in political and security affairs may be attributed to a combination of factors: its expansive economic interests, long-standing national legitimacy reinforced by its role in welfare and development programs, and a conscription-based recruitment system that facilitates cross-class integration within the armed services.

In 2019, it was reported that the Egyptian Armed Forces had begun a broad modernization effort under President Abdel Fattah el-Sisi, after a long period of operational stagnation dating to the 1970s. Procurement rose sharply, with purchases from France, Russia, and Germany adding new fighter aircraft, naval vessels, submarines, and surveillance systems to Egypt's inventory. These purchases supplemented longstanding military assistance from the United States and broadened Egypt's range of suppliers. Egypt has also reformed doctrine and structure, putting more weight on interoperability, air mobility, maritime operations, and special forces. Joint exercises with both regional and international partners have also expanded during this period. But the program still runs into structural obstacles: rigid command hierarchies, inadequate training, and too little investment in logistics. Even so, the reform is considered the most extensive military overhaul in Egypt in decades.

In March 2021, Human Rights Watch published a report saying that the Armed Forces had committed violations of international law during operations in North Sinai, including the demolition of more than 12,300 residential and commercial structures and the clearance of approximately 6,000 hectares of farmland since 2013.

== Structure ==
The Supreme Commander-in-Chief is the President of Egypt, currently Abdel Fattah el-Sisi. All branches, forces, armies, regions, bodies, organs and departments of the Armed Forces are under the command of the Commander-in-Chief of the Armed Forces, who is at the same time the Ministry of Defence and Military Production.

The Supreme Council of the Armed Forces (SCAF) is composed of 23 members, chaired by the Commander-in-Chief and Minister of Defence, and is represented by the Chief of Staff of the Armed Forces. Commanders of military areas (central, northern, western, southern), heads of bodies (operations, armament, logistics, engineering, training, finance, military justice, Armed Forces Management and Administration), directors of many departments (officers and Military Intelligence and Reconnaissance), and assistant secretary of defence for constitutional and legal affairs. The Secretary of the Board is the Secretary General of the Ministry of Defence.

=== Army ===
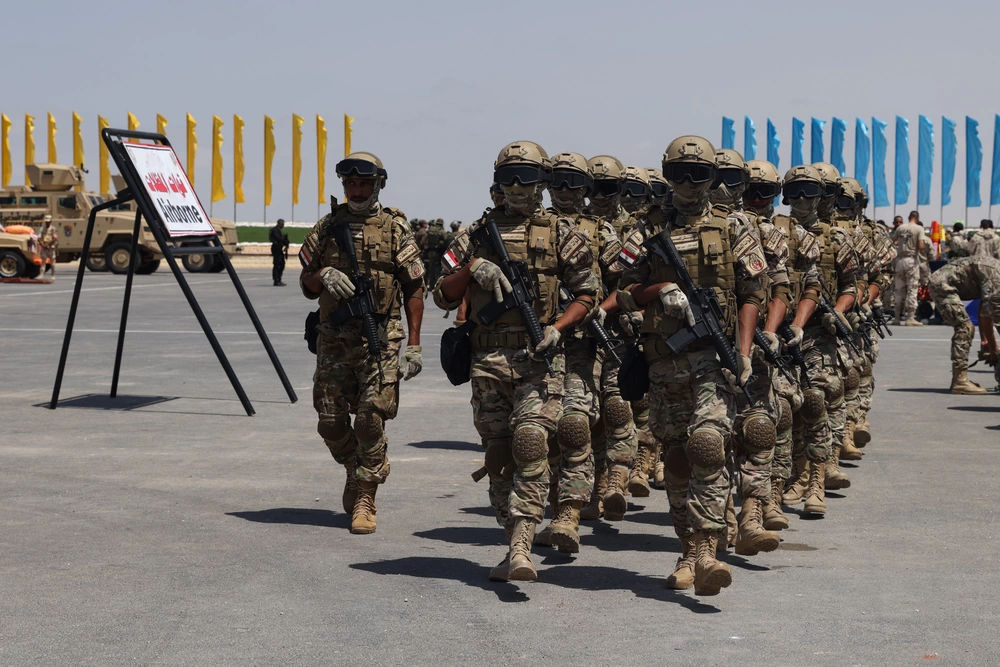
Egyptian soldiers march during Bright Star 23 static display

A separate command for the Egyptian Land Forces was created on March 25, 1964. It was officially abolished after the Six-Day War of 1967, and the command of land forces was returned directly to the Chief of Staff of the Armed Forces. The ground formations are divided into the forces east of the canal, under whose command the two armies (the Second and the Third) and the military regions (central, northern, western, and southern), in contrast to the rest of the forces, bodies, departments, and auxiliary agencies.

Conscripts for the Egyptian Army and other service branches without a university degree serve three years as enlisted soldiers. Conscripts with a General Secondary School Degree serve two years as enlisted personnel. Conscripts with a university degree serve one year as enlisted personnel or three years as a reserve officer. Officers for the army are trained at the Egyptian Military Academy. The IISS estimated in 2020 that the Army numbered 90–120,000, with 190–220,000 conscripts, a total of 310,000.

=== Air Force ===
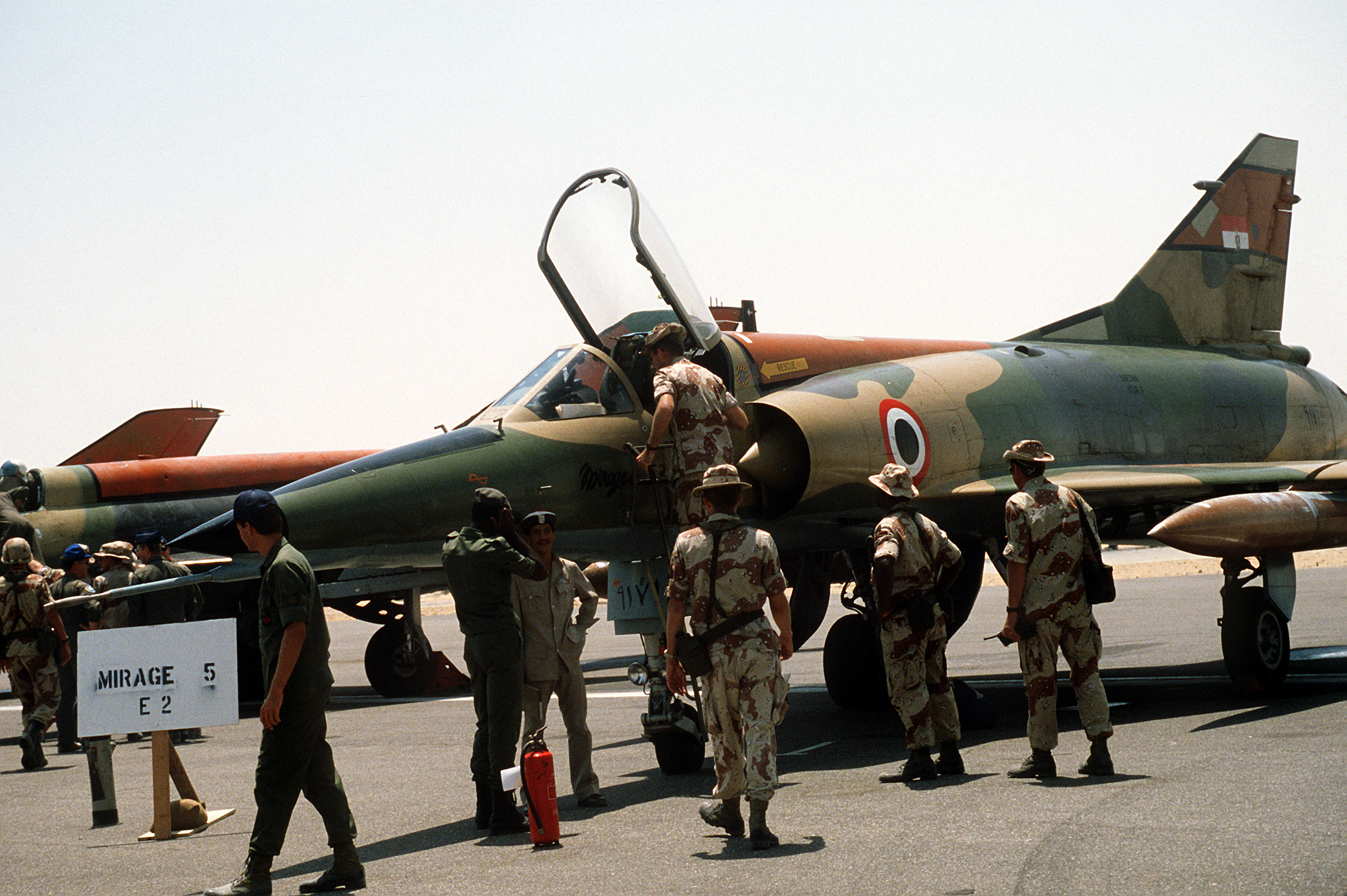
Egyptian Mirage V at Cairo-West air base, 1985

The Egyptian Air Force (EAF) operates aircraft from the United States, France, Russia, and other countries. Its mainstay platform is the F-16 Fighting Falcon, with Egypt having received 220 aircraft as of 2015, including Block 52 variants.

Since the mid-2010s, Egypt has modernized its air force to improve combat readiness, diversify procurement, and replace aging fleets. In 2015 Egypt agreed with France to buy 24 Dassault Rafale fighter jets, and a second deal in 2021 added 30 more, for a total of 54. These aircraft are stationed at Gebel El Basur and are equipped with weapon systems from MBDA and Safran Electronics & Defense, which improved Egypt's multirole strike capabilities.

Complementing these are 46 MiG-29M/M2 fighters acquired from Russia, and legacy platforms such as the Mirage 2000, MiG-21, F-7 Skybolt, and Mirage V, though many older aircraft have been retired. The EAF's rotary wing assets include 46 AH-64 Apache helicopters upgraded to the AH-64D variant, as well as 42 Kamov Ka-52 from Russia. The EAF also operates airborne early warning aircraft such as the E-2C Hawkeye and upgraded F-16s equipped with AGM-84 Harpoon capabilities.

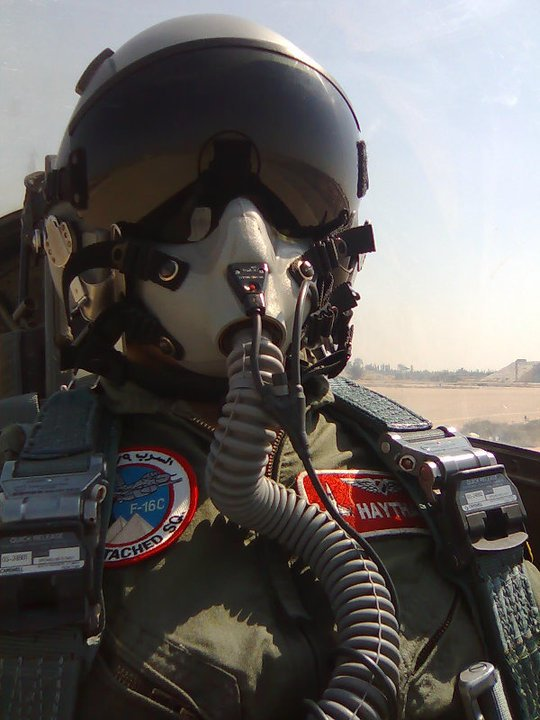
An Egyptian F16C Pilot

Egypt has also upgraded older platforms, fitting Emirati-supplied Al Tariq precision-guided munitions to its Mirage 2000s and making similar upgrades to later-block F-16Cs.

Egypt has also explored expanding its fixed-wing fleet with platforms from multiple suppliers. Planned acquisitions included 24 Eurofighter Typhoons and 24 M-346 jet trainers from Italy, although these deals were not finalized. More recently, Egypt has shown interest in acquiring Chinese J-10C and J-31 fighter aircraft.

While Egypt has historically faced US-imposed limitations in its access to long-range air-to-air weaponry, its recent purchases and diversification of suppliers point to a push for technological parity with regional air forces. Egypt has also sought stronger deterrence and greater operational independence.

In 2024 Israeli media reported that Egypt now possesses long-range Meteor air-to-air missiles, capable of striking targets beyond visual range at supersonic speeds with high precision and a range of over 150 kilometres. Egypt has also received Russian R-77 beyond visual range air-to-air missiles as part of its MiG-29M/M2 deliveries.

For training, the EAF fields Grob G-115 and K-8 Karakorum aircraft, and has developed UAV capabilities through various private sector and international partnerships. Egypt expanded its strategic airlift by buying two Il-76MF aircraft in 2019.

=== Air Defense Forces ===
The Egyptian Air Defense Forces is Egypt's military service responsible for air defense. Egypt patterned its force after the Soviet Air Defence Force, which integrated all its air defence capabilities; antiaircraft guns, rocket and missile units, interceptor planes, and radar and warning installations. It appears to comprise five subordinate divisions, 110 surface-to-air missile battalions, and 12 anti-aircraft artillery brigades. Personnel quality has been assessed as somewhat lower than that of the Egyptian Air Force. The IISS estimated in 2020 that personnel numbered 80,000 active and 70,000 reserve. Its commander is Lieutenant General Aly Fahmy Mohammed Aly Fahmi.

In recent years Egypt has undertaken a broad and sustained modernization of its air defense network, integrating a mix of Western, Russian, and domestic systems into a layered architecture. This includes the acquisition of German-made IRIS-T systems, comprising seven IRIS-T SLM medium-range batteries, six IRIS-T SLS short-range units, and ten IRIS-T SLX long-range batteries. The first systems were delivered in 2021, though subsequent shipments were delayed in 2022 after Germany redirected some systems to Ukraine in response to the Russian invasion. These platforms are supported by German TRML-4D radars and operate alongside French Ground Master 400 AESA radars and Russian 59N6E Protivnik-GE early warning systems.

In addition to European acquisitions, Egypt received the Russian S-300VM surface-to-air missile system beginning in 2017, offering long-range, high-altitude intercept capabilities. The S-300VM adds to Egypt's existing inventory and improves its defense against ballistic and cruise missiles.

The United States has also contributed to Egypt's air defense capacity, supplying surplus systems including the Chaparral short-range air defense system and associated spare parts. These systems are used primarily for localized defense, particularly along Egypt's borders, complementing Egypt's American MIM-104F/PAC-3 Patriot batteries acquired in 1999.

In 2025 Egypt confirmed acquiring China's advanced HQ-9B long-range surface-to-air missile system. The system significantly enhances Egypt's air defense capabilities by providing long-range coverage of up to 300 kilometers and the ability to track and engage multiple targets simultaneously, thanks to its advanced HT-233 3D phased-array radar. Its launchers carry a mix of smaller and larger missiles to address various aerial threats, including aircraft, cruise missiles, ballistic missiles, and stealth targets. The system provides 360-degree radar coverage and cold-launch capability.

=== Navy ===
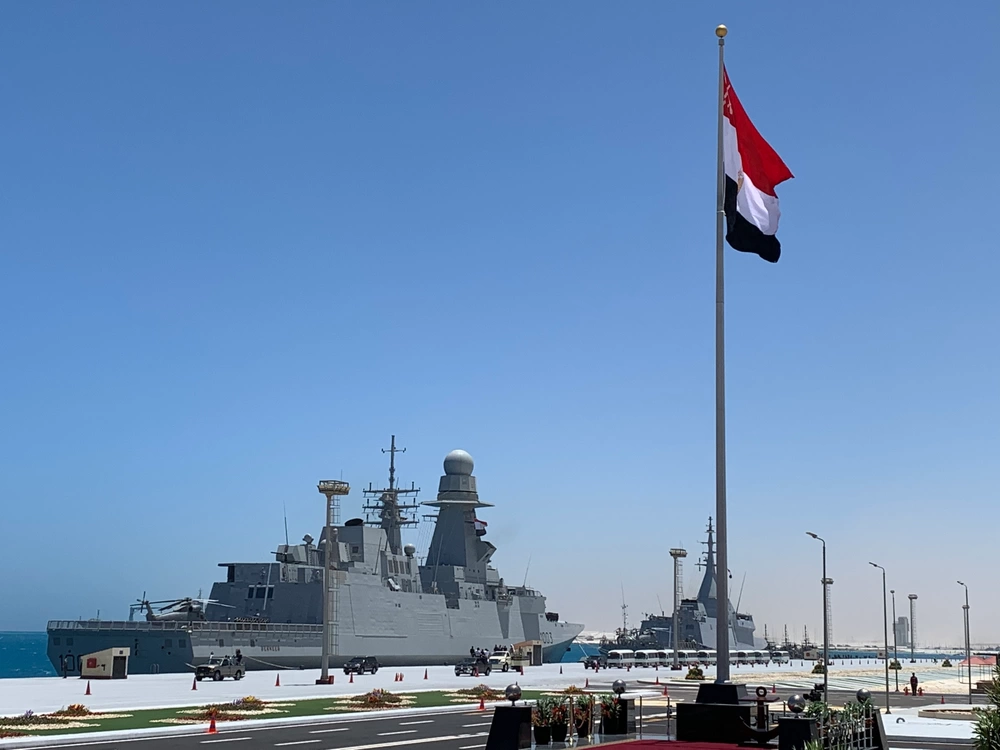
Egyptian frigates, a FREMM (foreground) and a MEKO A200 (background), moored at the pier of the Gargoub naval base on the Mediterranean Sea.

Organized naval activity in Egypt can be traced to the Early Dynastic period, around 2800 BCE, when the state developed rudimentary maritime capabilities to support transport, trade, and military expeditions along the Nile and adjacent coasts.

During the early modern period, Muhammad Ali, who became wali in 1805, established autonomous rule over Egypt and initiated a broad program of state and military development. As part of his efforts to build an empire, he prioritized the creation of a strong military, beginning with the army and followed by the navy. At the outset of his rule, Egypt already possessed a rudimentary naval force primarily used for troop transport. Its first recorded deployment was during the Wahhabi War, facilitating the movement of troops from Egypt to Yanbu in the Hejaz.

In 1815, Muhammad Ali established the Alexandria Shipyard to construct warships. By the time of the Greek War of Independence, the Egyptian Navy had more than 100 warships and several hundred transport vessels. In 1827, this fleet participated in the Battle of Navarino, a decisive engagement in the war. Following World War II, elements of Egypt's naval forces were stationed in the Red Sea, although the majority remained concentrated in the Mediterranean. The navy's main headquarters and operational facilities are based at Ras el-Tin near Alexandria.

The Egyptian Navy also oversees the Egyptian Coast Guard, which is tasked with protecting coastal infrastructure and patrolling territorial waters to counter smuggling. According to the IISS Military Balance 2017, the Coast Guard comprised approximately 2,000 personnel, operating 14 fast patrol boats and 65 additional patrol vessels, including 15 Swiftships, 21 Timsah-class, three Type-89s, and nine Peterson-class boats.

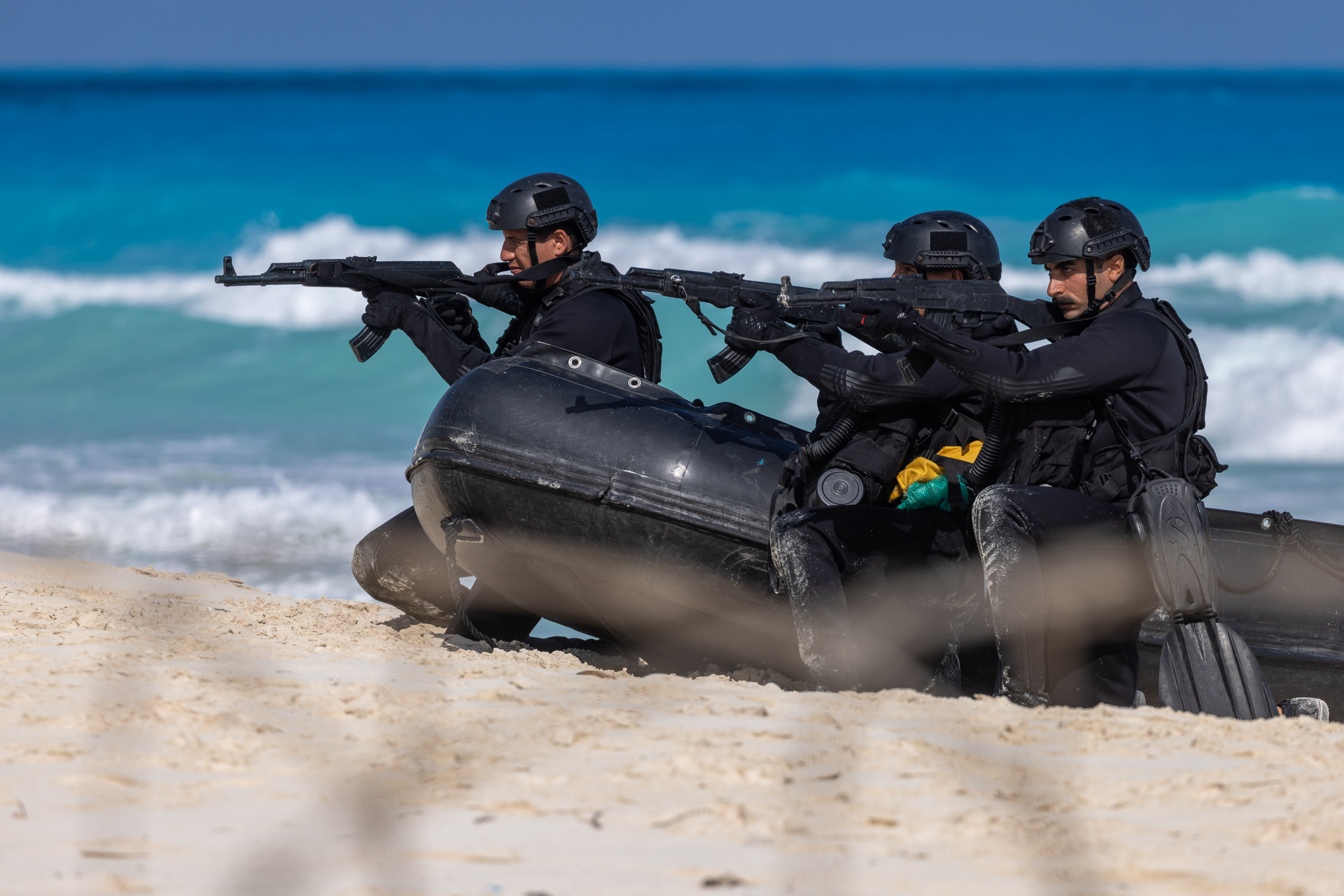
Egyptian soldiers taking part in an amphibious assault exercise.

Since 2014, Egypt has run a naval modernization program to address weaknesses in its fleet and extend its reach beyond territorial waters. It has invested in new ships, infrastructure, and training to build a blue-water navy. Purchases include Mistral-class amphibious assault ships, FREMM and MEKO A-200 frigates, Gowind-class corvettes, and Type 209 submarines, as well as utility helicopters and coastal patrol vessels.

Egypt has also pursued domestic shipbuilding through technology transfer agreements and expanded its naval infrastructure with new bases such as Berenice on the Red Sea and Ras Gargoub on the Mediterranean. The aim is to project naval power, extend logistical reach, and defend Egypt's maritime interests.

=== Other agencies ===
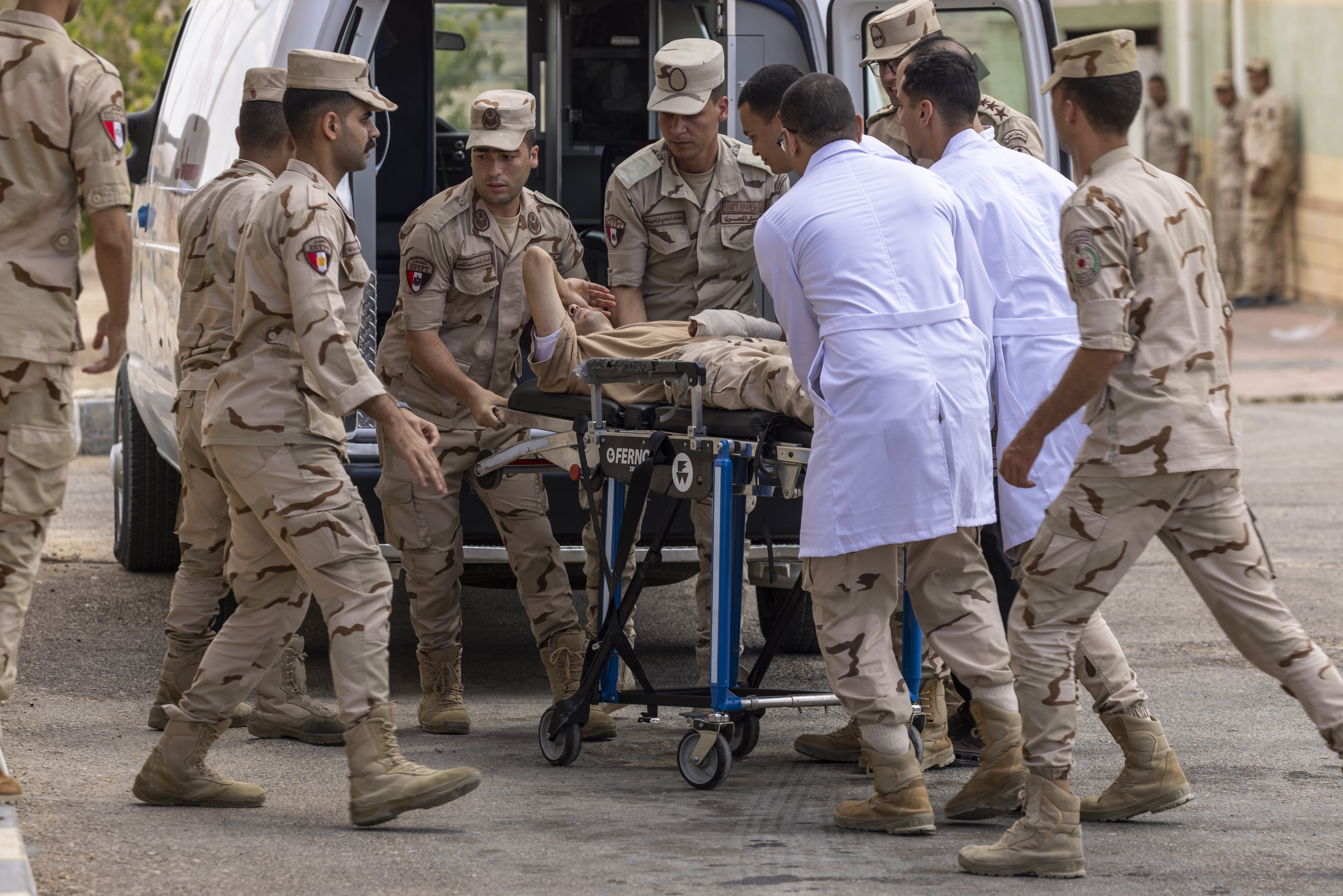
Egyptian soldiers during a MEDEVAC exercise demonstration

The Armed Forces Medical Service Department provides many military health services. The Armed Forces College of Medicine in Heliopolis, Cairo, provides medical training. As of February 2020, the AFCM commandant was Maj. Gen. Dr. Amr Hegab.

Egypt also maintains 397,000 paramilitary troops. The Central Security Forces comes under the control of the Ministry of Interior. As of 2017, the Egyptian Border Guard Corps falls under the control of the Ministry of Interior as well. Circa 2020, according to the IISS Military Balance 2020, they comprised an estimated 12,000, in 18 border regiments, with light weapons only (IISS 2020, p. 375). However, that listing of numbers has remained the same at least since the 2017 edition (p. 375).

== Military equipment and industry ==
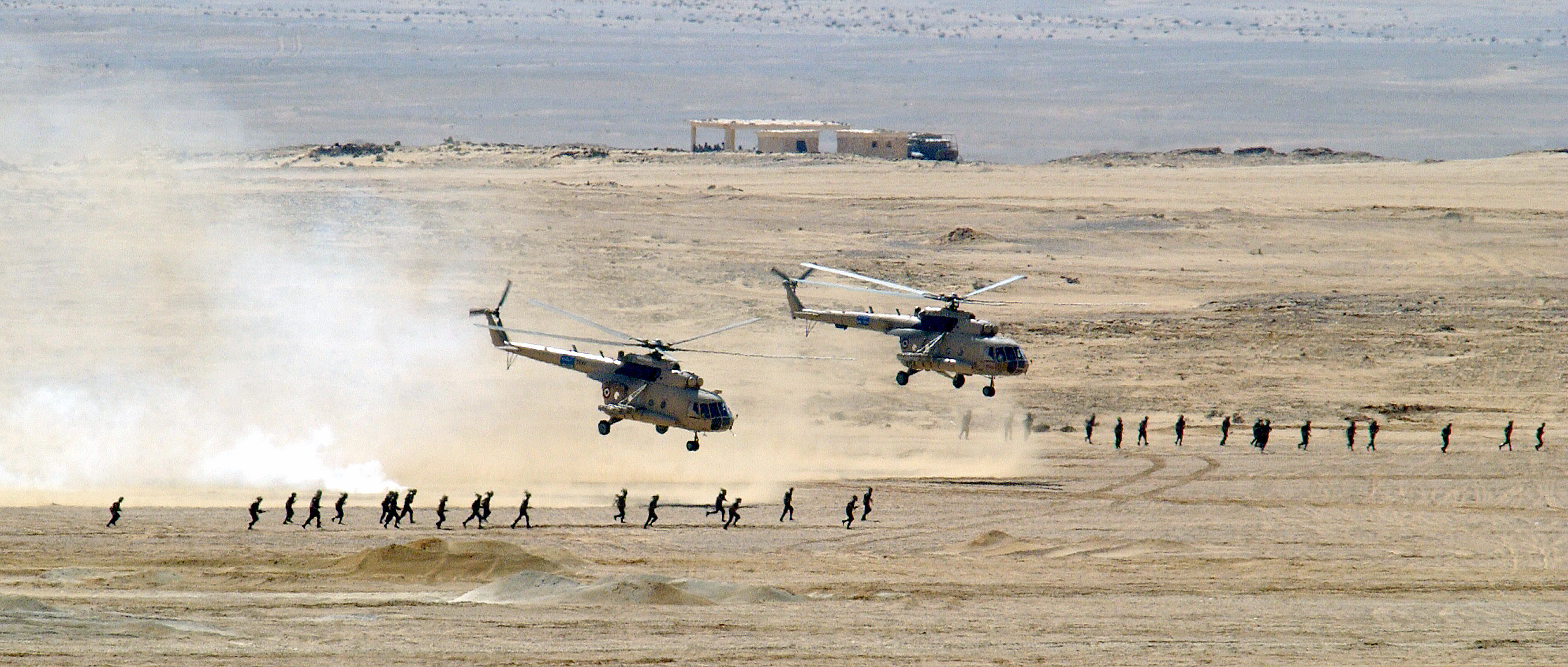
Egyptian Mi-8 Hip helicopters after unloading troops

The inventory of the Egyptian Armed Forces includes equipment from many countries, including the United States, France, Russia, Germany, Brazil, the United Kingdom, the Soviet Union, and the People's Republic of China. This broad range of suppliers has caused interoperability and maintenance problems. However, older systems are being gradually phased out in favor of more modern platforms acquired from multiple sources, and a substantial share is produced under license in Egypt, most notably the M1A1 Abrams tank.

In 2023 Egyptian company ACME SAICO released a C5ISR system designed to integrate and coordinate military platforms from both Western and Eastern origins. Developed to address the interoperability challenges of Egypt's diverse arsenal, the platform uses real-time "interface layers" to translate data across incompatible systems. Already certified and operational within the Egyptian Armed Forces, the system has been integrated into all current air force aircraft and is being expanded to land and naval platforms. It builds on earlier iterations such as RISC3, and a more advanced C6ISR system is under joint development with Lockheed Martin.

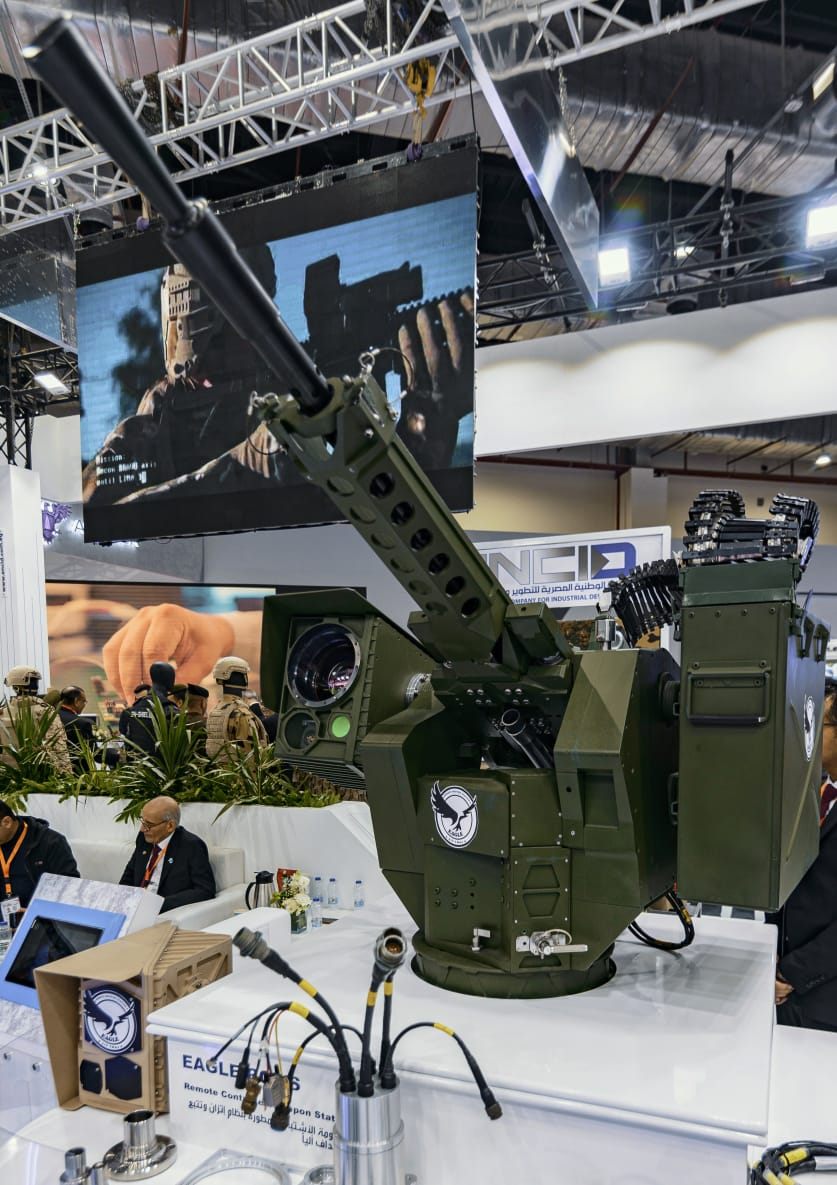
Eagle 1, a remote controlled weapon station developed by Arab International Optronics

The Ministry of Military Production oversees a wide network of factories and companies, including Abu Zaabal Specialized Industries, which manufactures ammunition and small arms; Abu Zaabal Engineering Industries, which produces artillery systems and shells; and the Armoured Production and Repair Factory, which builds and maintains armored vehicles such as the M1A1 Abrams, K9A1EGY, RAAD 200, and Sinai 200. The Thales & Benha Electronics S.A.E. joint venture, formed between France’s Thales Group and Benha Electronics, specializes in advanced communication systems, research, and training. Meanwhile, the Arab Organization for Industrialization (AOI) supervises multiple enterprises engaged in aerospace, electronics, vehicles, and armaments. AOI's subsidiaries include Kader for Developed Industries, which designs and manufactures armored vehicles; Sakr for Developed Industries, which produces missiles and rockets; and joint ventures such as Arab British Dynamics Co., which specializes in guided weaponry, and Arab American Vehicles Co., which assembles military and civilian vehicles. AOI also has a history of licensed aircraft production in Helwan, manufacturing the Alpha Jet and K-8E, and now seeks to replace these with the KAI T-50 Golden Eagle.

Naval defense production is led by the Alexandria Shipyard, which constructs frigates, corvettes, and patrol boats. Through partnerships with France’s Naval Group, the shipyard produces the Gowind 2500 corvettes, while cooperation with Germany’s ThyssenKrupp Marine Systems enables local manufacturing of the MEKO A200 frigates. In the private sector, Robotics Engineering Systems develops unmanned aerial vehicles and smart munitions such as guided missiles and glide bombs, while Amstone works on fifth-generation naval and aerial unmanned systems.

Egypt is one of the few countries in the Middle East to possess spy satellites, launching EgyptSat 1 in 2007, followed by EgyptSat 2 in 2014. In 2019, Egypt launched MisrSat-A, an observation satellite, followed later that year by Tiba-1, a civilian and military communications satellite. In 2023, Egypt launched Horus-1 and Horus-2, about a month apart. The country also placed MisrSat-2 into orbit later that year. All three of them are high-resolution observation satellites. In 2024, two months after MisrSat-2's launch, the country successfully completed the initial operational phase of NEXSAT-1, its first experimental Earth observation satellite. The project produced indigenous onboard software and attitude-control systems, and Egypt captured and processed the satellite imagery itself.

== Military schools ==
There is an undergraduate military school for each branch of the Egyptian Armed Forces, and they include:

- Commanders and Staff College
- Reserve Officer College
- Military Academy for Postgraduate and Strategic Studies
- Egyptian Military Academy
- Egyptian Military College
- Egyptian Air College
- Egyptian Naval College
- Egyptian Air Defense College
- Egyptian Military Technical College
- Armed Forces Technical Institute
- Armed Forces Institute for NCOs
- Technical Institute of Nursing
- Thunderbolt School
- Airborne School

== See also ==
- Flags of the Egyptian Armed Forces
- Military of Ancient Egypt
- Ptolemaic army
- Military of the Tulunid Emirate
- Military of the Mamluk Sultanate
- Ancient Egyptian navy
- Ptolemaic navy
- Fatimid navy
