= Northern Military Region =

Northern Military Region may refer to:

- Northern Military Region (Egypt)
- Northern Military Region (Sweden)

== See also ==
- Northern Region (disambiguation)
