= Mohammed Salman El-Zamlout =

Mohamed Salman El-Zamlout
- محمد سالمان الزملوط

Governor of Matrouh Governorate
- Incumbent
- Assumed office February 17, 2026
- Preceded by: Khaled Shuaib

Governor of New Valley Governorate
- In office February 16, 2017 – February 17, 2026
- Preceded by: Mahmoud Ashmawy
- Succeeded by: Hanan Magdy

Commander of the Northern Military Region
- In office July 2014 – December 20, 2016
- Preceded by: Saeed Abbas
- Succeeded by: Mohamed Lotfy

Personal details
- Born: North Sinai Governorate

Military service
- Rank: Major general

Mohammed Salman El-Zamlout (Arabic: محمد سالمان الزملوط) (Note: Also spelled محمد سليمان الزملوط, or Mohammed Suleiman Al-Zamloot.) is an Egyptian officer and politician currently serving as governor of Matrouh Governorate since 2026.

== Biography ==
Al Youm Al Sabea reported in 2016 that El-Zamlout is a descendant of the al-Ruba'iya family of the al-Bayadiya tribe, and was born in North Sinai Governorate. He graduated from the Egyptian Military Academy as a lieutenant, and then received a masters from the Command and Staff College, the highest academic degree in the Egyptian Armed Forces.

In 2014, El-Zamlout was appointed commander of the Northern Military Region. El-Zamlout was promoted to major general in 2017. Between December 2016 and February 2017, he was head of the Military Research Authority, the body in the Egyptian Army that records the history of the army.

In February 2017, El-Zamlout was appointed governor of New Valley Governorate. His predecessor, Mahmoud Ashmawy, was reshuffled and appointed governor of Qalyubiyya Governorate. He held this position for nine years, until being appointed governor of Matrouh Governorate in February 2026.
