= Armed Forces Training Authority (Egypt) =

Agency of the Egyptian Ministry of Defense

Armed Forces Training Authority is an agency of the Egyptian Ministry of Defense and the only body mandated training for each individual fighters in the Egyptian Armed Forces. The agency manages training programs for all members of the Egyptian Armed Forces.

It also collaborates with entities like the Ministry of Education to introduce baccalaureate programs for NCOs, and coordinates multinational military drills, including Bright Star and Badr. The Armed Forces Training Authority oversees training exchanges and missions for foreign military cadres, and recognizes academic excellence among officers during events like the Armed Forces' Scientific Excellence Day.
