= Armed Forces Engineering Authority (Egypt) =

- الهيئة الهندسية للقوات المسلحة

Agency overview
- Headquarters: Cairo, Egypt
- Agency executive: Staff Major General / Ahmad El-Azzazi, CEO

Armed Forces Engineering Authority is one of the Egyptian Ministry of Defense agencies. The Armed Forces Engineering Authority, through its affiliated departments (Military Works, Military Survey, Water, Major Projects, Military Engineers, Department of Licensing, Inspection and Follow-up), carries out many specialized tasks and engineering insurance operations for the main branches of the Armed Forces.

It also contributes to the comprehensive development process of the state. Starting from clearing the land of war remnants to establish development and urban projects, establishing networks of free roads, bridges and airports in various governorates of Egypt, establishing many water desalination plants and drilling wells, extending water lines to new cities and urban communities, implementing surveying work and issuing maps and encyclopedias to assist civil agencies. In implementing mega projects, as well as participating in healthy cultural and social development projects by establishing and developing schools, hospitals, health units, and cultural development centers in all parts of Egypt, establishing agricultural and production projects, manufacturing raw materials and construction materials used in the projects, and establishing and developing stadiums, stadiums, and sports arenas to hold local and international tournaments. It also assists the civil sector in overcoming the effects resulting from natural and industrial disasters, carrying out rescue, rescue and rapid intervention operations using the latest devices and various equipment, capabilities and capabilities, sheltering those affected, removing rubble and assisting in establishing health isolation camps.

== Tasks in times of peace ==
- Contribute in the areas of development in Egypt and the establishment of major development projects
- Contribute to remove the effects of local disasters and crises
- Participation of in the aftermath of a major disaster to remove the effects (to reconstruct)
- Participation in infrastructure and construction of bridges, roads and fields
- Participation in education by building schools
- Participation in the fields of psychology and clearing of land mines and explosive remnants of war
- Participation in the areas of political development and the development of sports facilities
- Supply the civil sector effective cadres
- Participation in the area of economic housing
- General planning of cities and the creation of Bedouin villages and Nubian houses
- Remove the effects of disasters and floods and earthquakes, removing bombs and booby traps

== Affiliated departments ==
- Military Works and Landing Department
- Department of Military Engineers
- Military Survey Management
- Water management
- Management of major projects
- Licensing, inspection and follow-up management

== Heads of the Authority ==
- Staff Major General / Ahmad El-Azzazi
- Staff Major General / Hisham El-Suwaifi
- Staff Major General / Ehab El-Far
- Staff Major General / Kamel El-Wazir
- Staff Major General / Emad El-Alfi
- Staff Major General / Taher Abdullah
- Staff Major General / Ahmad Naeem El-Badrawi
- Staff Major General / Maged George
- Staff Major General / Galal Sirri
- Staff Major General / Mahmoud Fahim Abdel Aziz
