= Military justice (Egypt) =

Egyptian military justice, one of the Egyptian Ministry of Defense and military bodies, a competent authority of military courts with competence extraordinary according to the definition of the rule of the Egyptian Court of Cassation, which ruled the Egyptian military provisions of Law No. 25 of 1966 and its amendmentsThe Military Justice Law of 1966 superseded a code of military justice that the British enacted in 1893.
