= Central Military Region (Egypt) =

The Central Military Region is one of the five military regions of the Egyptian Armed Forces and is headquartered in Cairo.

It contains the following units:

- 2nd Mechanised Division (Highkestep, Cairo)
  - 120th Mechanized Infantry Brigade
  - 4th Mechanized Infantry Brigade
  - 56th Armored Brigade
  - 51st Med. Range Artillery Brigade
- 9th Armoured Division (Dahshur, southwest of Giza)
  - 71st Armored Brigade
  - 72nd Armored Brigade
  - 90th Mechanized Infantry Brigade
  - 44th Med. Range Artillery Brigade
- 23rd Independent Armored Brigade
- Two Engineer Brigades
- Two Long Range Artillery Brigades
- 9th Reconnaissance Battalion
- 10th Drone Reconnaissance Battalion
