= Armed Forces Finance Authority (Egypt) =

Egyptian Ministry of Defence agency

Armed Forces Finance Authority is one of the Egyptian Ministry of Defence agencies. In 2020 it was headed by Ahmed El-Shazly.

== Heads ==
- Brigade Staff of War / Mohammed Amin Nasr.
- Brigade Staff of War / Anwar Mahmoud Nasr.
- Brigade Staff of War / Hazem Fawzy.
