= Armed Forces Logistics Authority (Egypt) =

Armed Forces Logistics Authority is one of the Egyptian Ministry of Defense agencies. Overall, the AFLA has a wide bracket of responsibilities. The AFLA is responsible for operating and improving the supply system of the Armed Forces. The AFLA owns the Catcher Defensive production corporation. The AFLA provides supplies military hospitals as appropriate alongside the Ministry of Health, both of which ensure military hospitals have the correct equipment. The AFLA assists humanitarian agencies during times of crisis. The AFLA is, in part, an attempt to ensure the Armed Forces is self-sufficient in all needs.

The AFLA is responsible for the production of food for the soldiers of the Armed Forces and to assist the civil sector in times of shortage. The AFLA's bread production capacity has reached three million loaves a day.

Furthermore, the AFLA is responsible for the production of pharmaceutical drugs and prosthetic devices for members of the Armed Forces, and selling the surplus to private sector corporations, along with producing clothing and gear for the Armed Forces and the Egyptian Ministry of Defense. Additionally, the Armed Forces Logistics Authority increases the performance of the government through research and the development of technical systems and simulators to keep up with global development.

The AFLA acts as an auxiliary to carry out rapid search and rescue operations and assists the civil sector of government in this. The AFLA also helps construct aid camps.
