= Southern Military Region (Egypt) =

Southern Military Region is one of the five military regions of the Egyptian armed forces. it is headquartered in Assiut.

== Structure ==
The Southern Military Region is the smallest military region of the four, as it only consists of three Mechanized Infantry Brigades, two Engineer Brigades and one medium range Artillery Brigade.

- 116th Mechanized Brigade (Assiut)
- 117th Mechanized Brigade (Assiut)
- 305th Mechanized Brigade (Aswan)
