= Military Operations Authority (Egypt) =

Egyptian military agency

The Military Operations Authority is one of the Egyptian Ministry of Defense agencies. It is located in Cairo, Egypt. It is responsible for all combat operations conducted by the Egyptian Armed Forces, whether on land, at sea, or in the air, and plans offensive operations.

Additionally, it presents proposals and visions regarding the armament and modernization of tanks and combat aircraft, as well as war strategies; it is also the body responsible for formulating future plans to counter any potential adversary. Former directors include Ahmad Ismail Ali and Ahmed Salah El-Din Abdel-Halim (1983-86).

== See also ==
- Egyptian Armed Forces
