= Egyptian Armoured Corps =

Military unit of the Egyptian Army

- سلاح المدرعات المصري
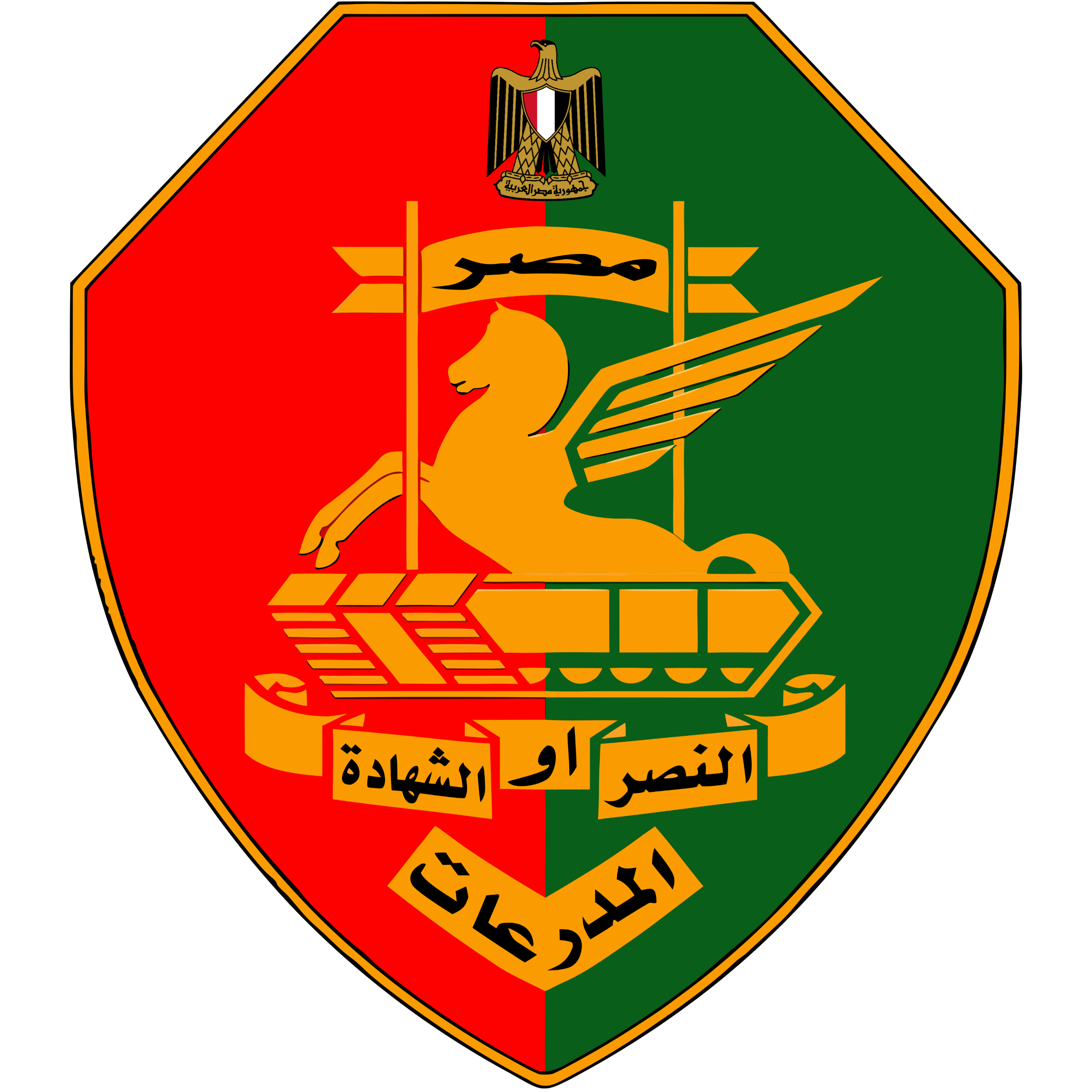
- Official Emblem
- Active: 1828 - 1961 (Cavalry Corps); 1961 - present (Armoured Corps)
- Country: Egypt
- Branch: Egyptian Army
- Type: Armoured corps
- Size: See Formations in 2018-2019
- Garrison/HQ: Heliopolis, Cairo
- Motto: Victory or Martyrdom
- Colors: Red & Green
- Mascot: Treaded Chariot

Commanders
- Current commander: Major General Reda Fadil
- Notable commanders: Brigadier General Muhammad Abdel Aziz Qabil, Ibrahim El-Orabi

The Egyptian Armoured Corps is a branch of the Egyptian Army and the second main Corps responsible for Armoured operations. It was established after the Egyptian Cavalry Corps was converted to use vehicles, after 1930.

== History ==
In 1922, the Kingdom of Egypt was established under the rule of Fuad I. Fuad's administration began to modernise the armed forces. The modernisation programme was focused on mechanisation, building new military schools, enlisting more men, and reestablishing units. In 1928, the name of the Cavalry Corps was changed to the Royal Egyptian Cavalry Corps. The mechanisation process completely modernised the Cavalry Corps whose units (except the Royal Guards) replaced their horses with armoured vehicles. By the late 1930s the whole Corps was mechanised.

=== World War II ===
Rothwell writes that, at the end of August 1939, moves began to reinforce the Egyptian-Libyan frontier: "..Foremost in these moves was the Sudanese-manned Frontier Force of five squadrons mounted on Ford pick-ups. Two squadrons took up places at Siwa and others at Sollum. The frontier was then almost entirely in Egyptian hands, in accordance with the treaty and the British strategy not to provoke the Italians. The southern desert flank was covered by the ‘South Western Force’ of Egyptian light tanks (six Mk VIB), motorised units and No. 1 Squadron, Royal Egyptian Air Force" equipped with Westland Lysanders.

=== First Arab-Israel War ===
During the 1948 Arab–Israeli War, Egyptian cavalry units were sent with the 20,000-strong expeditionary force. They made use of M4 Shermans and the Vickers Mark II.

=== Suez Crisis ===
The Armoured Corps involvement in the 1956 war began on October 29, 1956, when a reconnaissance regiment, followed by the 1st and 2nd armoured Groups (brigades) was ordered to cross the Suez Canal, from its location in the Deversoir area to the eastern side to counter Israeli advances. The plan was to drive the division into Sinai and attack Cairo from the Northeast but this plan was quickly exposed and the division was sent to the Port Said front instead. Order of battle of the corps in 1956 was an armored division, 2 armored groups (brigades) and 1 training brigade.

=== North Yemen Civil War ===
As the political and military situation worsened after the 1962 Yemeni coup d'état, Egypt decided to intervene in the North Yemen Civil War with a small military force, and then later with a large scale invasion force. The Egyptian Armoured Corps fought there extensively, with the 4th Armoured Division and armoured brigades supporting infantry divisions. Their most notable service there was during the Ramadan Offensive.

Ibrahim El-Orabi reportedly commanded Armoured Corps forces in Yemen for a period.

=== Six-Day War ===
The Egyptian Armoured Corps were obliterated in Sinai during the Six-Day War.

==== Post Six Day War modernisation ====
After the Six Day War, the whole Armed forces went through a process of extensive training and modernisation to prepare for the October War. The Armoured Corps replaced the old T-54s, T-34s, and SU-100s with T-62s and BMP-1s, and got trained on newer tactics, new better commanders got in command and new units were formed.

=== October War ===
The Artillery Corps bombarded the Bar Lev Line fortifications at the beginning of the October War. Supporting Infantry stormed the east bank of Suez Canal engaging Israel Defense Force personnel. Israeli reservist armoured forces began engaging the Egyptian forces, but were engaged by anti-tank squadrons using the AT-3 Sagger wire-guided anti-tank missiles. Israeli armoured units lost approximately 270-300 of 400 tanks to these anti-Tank Squadrons.

Egyptian Infantry seised a number of strongpoints along the Bar Lev Line in a series of battles. On October 7, Egyptian Armoured units of the 2nd and 3rd Armies and Port Said Sector passed over the bridgeheads made by pontoons constructed by the Egyptian Combat Engineers and entered combat with the Infantry formations in several battles such as Battle of Firdan alongside the 2nd Infantry Division and the heavy Armoured battles of El Qantarah alongside the 18th Infantry Division.

The Armoured Corps's most notable action throughout the war was the advance of the 12th Brigade of the 4th Armoured Division 22 kilometres deep into Sinai.

In the second half of 1984, General Dynamics received a $150 million contract to build a new tank plant in Egypt. It was to be called Factory 200, and to be located in Abu Zaabal, an industrial suburb north of Cairo. It initially overhauled U.S. M60 tanks and M88 Recovery Vehicles. M1 Abrams production commenced in 1992. It is now called the Armoured Production and Repair Factory.

=== Gulf War ===
After Iraq invaded Kuwait, Egypt joined the Coalition of the Gulf War. When the coalition was formed, Egypt established a 35,000 strong corps-sized force made up of the 4th Armoured Division (Egypt), 3rd Mechanised Division, the 170th Airborne Brigade of the Egyptian Airborne Corps, the 20th Commando Regiment (brigade) and a number of engineers, air defence, and other support units.

The Egyptian force was unable to move up the first attack time after a request from overall commander U.S. General Norman Schwarzkopf; halted after 'desultory' Iraqi artillery fire; continued to move so slowly that on the morning of the third day of the war, still had not taken their first day's objectives; and could not reorient themselves in order to take up an invitation to join a ceremonial joint Arab entry into Kuwait City until Schwarzkopf was able to get Hosni Mubarak to give a direct order to the Egyptian commander to do so.

A number of modernisation programmes were put in place for Egypt's older Soviet main battle tanks from the 1990s.

=== Formations in 2018-2019 ===
In 2018 armoured formations of the Egyptian Army included the 4th, 6th, 9th, and 21st Armoured Divisions, the 11th and 76th Independent Armoured Brigades, a further independent armoured brigade stationed in the Western Military Region, and two armoured brigades of the Republican Guard.

An October 2019 report by the Israeli website nziv.net wrote that three of the four armoured divisions used M1 Abrams main battle tanks; the fourth, the 21st Armoured Division, deployed near the Libyan border in the Western Military Region, used older M60A1 and M60A3 Patton tanks. In addition, the armoured brigades of the mechanised divisions used the older T-55 and T-62 tanks. The same report said that all older Soviet T-series tanks, as well as some other MBTs, were to be replaced with T-90 tanks that Egypt planned to produce under Russian license in its own factories. The Armoured Corps was to standardize on the M1 series and the T-90.

In 2020 the IISS Military Balance said that Egypt had 2,480 main battle tanks: 1,130 M1A1 Abrams; 300 M60A1; 850 M60A3; and 200 T-62. There were an additional 840 T-54/T-55 and 300 T-62 all in store (IISS 2020, p345).

== See also ==
- Structure of the Egyptian Army
