= Bright Star =

Bright Star or variations of the term may refer to:

== Arts, entertainment, and media ==
=== Film and music ===
- Bright Star (film), 2009 feature about the life of poet John Keats
- Bright Star (musical), 2015 American musical
- Bright Star (radio), 1950s American drama series
- "Bright Star", a song by Anaïs Mitchell from Anaïs Mitchell, 2022

== Places ==
- Brightstar, Arkansas

== Other uses ==
- "Bright star, would I were stedfast as thou art", a love sonnet by John Keats
- SS Bright Star, a Panamanian coaster
- Operation Bright Star, name given to a number of U.S. military operations
- Bright Stars FC, Ugandan football club
- The South Sudan men's national basketball team, nicknamed the Bright Stars
- Fred Murree, Pawnee professional roller skater known as Bright Star
- Brightstar Corporation, a logistics and supply chain company

== See also ==
- Bright Star Catalogue, astronomical catalogue
- Bright giant, a class of star
- List of brightest stars
- Kwangmyŏngsŏng program, translated as Bright Star, North Korean satellites
- Bright Star Wilderness, area in Kern County, California
- Bright Star Technology, multimedia company
- BrightStar Gold Mine, a gold mine in Western Australia
