= Western Military Region (Egypt) =

- Country: Egypt
- Part of: Egyptian Armed Forces
- Garrison/HQ: Marsa Matrouh

Commanders
- Current commander: Major General Hatem Mustafa Zahran
- Notable commanders: Mahmoud Hegazy

The Western Military Region is one of the five military regions of the Egyptian Armed Forces and is headquartered in Marsa Matrouh.

In 1989-90, the regional commander "controlled armored forces supplemented by commando, artillery, and air defence units (possibly totaling the equivalent of a reinforced division) that were stationed at coastal towns in the west and in the Western Desert facing Libya."

Stratfor.com claimed on November 15, 2014 that the region's forces consisted of mostly armored and motorized infantry units: "At the moment, the bulk of these units consist of three brigades based in Mersa Matruh, with smaller forward units stationed in Sidi Barrani and Sallum." The Western Military Region conducts the "Thunder maneuvers" military exercise annually. The "Raad 24" exercise was carried out at the end of October 2015.

== Structure ==
As of 2018:

- 21st Armoured Division in Sidi Barrani. The division is currently made up of the 1st Armored Brigade, 14th Armored Brigade, 18th Mechanized Brigade and 51st Med. Range Artillery Brigade and Equipped with M60A3 main battle tanks and M1A1 main battle tanks. During the 1973 October War against Israel, the 21st Armoured Division, under Brigadier General Ibrahim El-Orabi included the 1st Armoured Brigade commanded by Mohamed Taufik Abu Shady (killed), replaced by Colonel Sayed Saleh, the 14th Armoured Brigade commanded by Colonel Othman Kamel, and the 18th Mechanized Brigade commanded by Colonel Talaat Muslim. The division was located within 16th Infantry Division (Egypt)'s bridgehead, as of October 13. Its units were positioned in the center and the north of the bridgehead. The 14th Brigade had been involved in the crossing and, along with the 1st Brigade, participated in the Egyptian offensive on October 14; as a result, it had lost half of its operational tank strength. In the aftermath, Orabi's efforts to reorganize and replace armored losses were hampered by frequent artillery barrages and air strikes. On October 15, there were 136 tanks in the Egyptian bridgehead, unevenly split among Oraby's brigades: 66 with the 1st Armored Brigade, 39 with the 14th Armoured Brigade, and 31 in the 18th Mechanized Brigade. Despite their heavy losses, the Egyptian forces in the bridgehead outnumbered Reshef's force.
- 33rd Mechanized Infantry Division (based in Sallum)
  - 130th Mechanized Infantry Brigade
  - 30th Mechanized Infantry Brigade
  - 22nd Armored Brigade
  - 66th Med. Range Artillery Brigade
- 44th Independent Armored brigade
- a medium-range artillery brigade
- an engineer construction brigade
- an engineer water brigade
