= Northern Military Region (Egypt) =

The Northern Military Region is one of the five military regions of the Egyptian Armed Forces. It is headquartered in Alexandria. It may include the Alexandria, Beheira, Kafr el-Sheikh Governorate and Gharbia Governorates.

The current structure of the Northern Military Region:

- 3rd Mechanized Infantry Division
  - 222nd Mechanized Infantry Brigade
  - 110th Mechanized Infantry Brigade
  - 199th Armored Brigade
  - 192nd Med. Range Artillery Brigade
- 76th Independent Armored Brigade
- One Independent medium range Artillery Brigade

Among previous region commanders were Staff Brigadiers Abdel Fattah al-Sisi, now president, and Mohammed Majid Faraj. Major General Khaled Shawqi is the Current commander.

== Gulf War Participation ==
During the Gulf War, the 3rd Mechanized Division was part of the corps sized Egyptian forces where it served as part of the Arab forces during the liberation of Kuwait alongside the 4th Armoured Division.
