= Operation Badr (1973) order of battle =

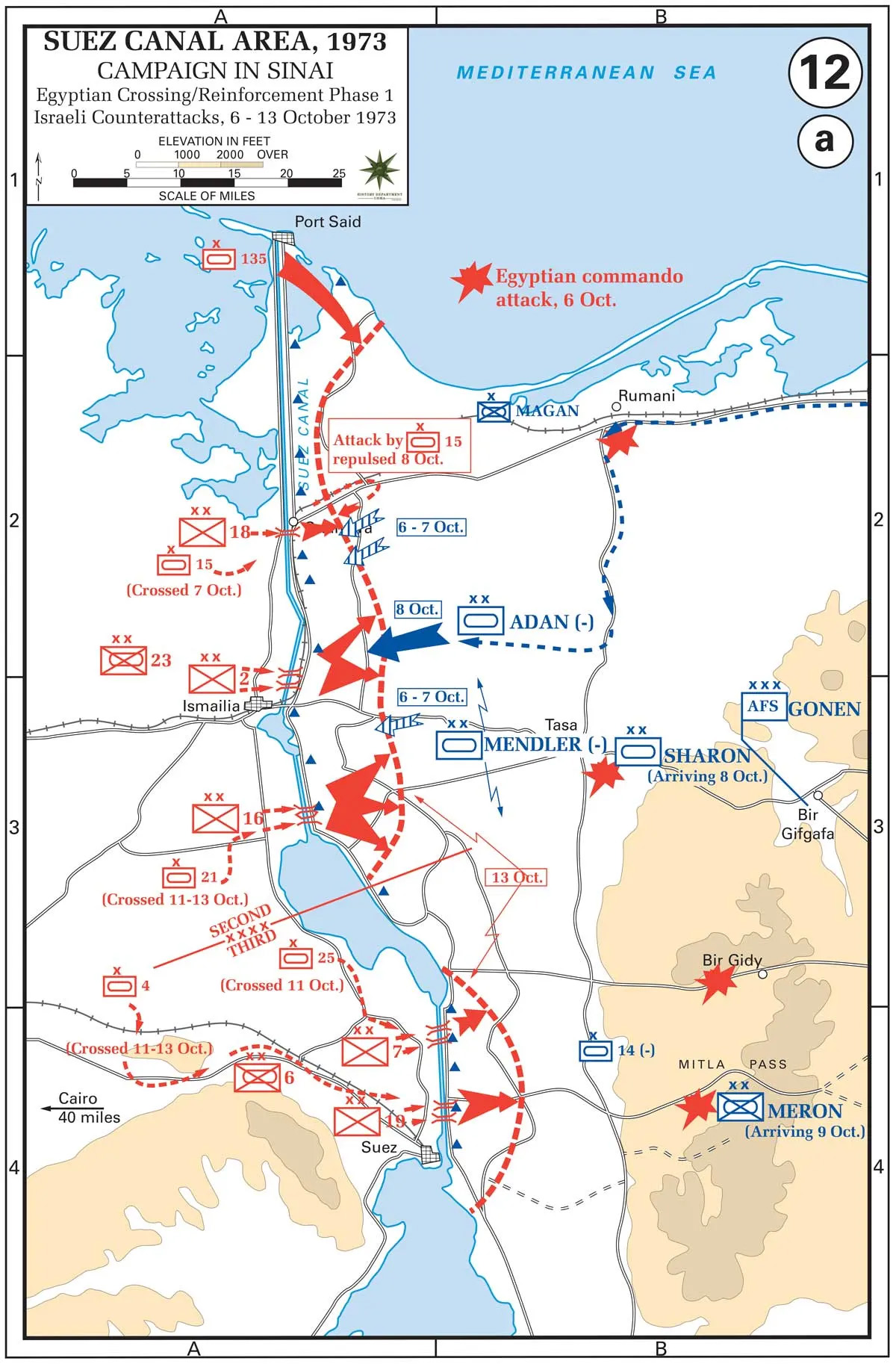
The Yom Kippur War's first stage map between 6 October and 13 October

This is the order of battle for Operation Badr, an Egyptian military operation aimed to destroy the Bar Lev Line and initiated the Yom Kippur War against Israel along the Suez Canal in the Sinai on 6 October 1973. As neither belligerent has released an official order of battle, this list remains incomplete (for example, concerning brigades within divisions of the Third Army) and largely conjectural. An asterisk indicates Egyptian units that participated in the operation.

The Sa'iqa (lit. "lightning") were Egyptian commando forces.

== Egyptian Army ==
General Headquarters (Center Ten):

Commander in Chief – Colonel General Ahmad Ismail Ali

Chief of Staff – Lieutenant General Saad El Shazly

Chief of Operations – Lieutenant General Abdel Ghani el-Gamasy

Engineer-in-Chief – Major General Gamal Mohamed Aly

Chief of Military Intelligence – Major General Ibrahim Fouad Nassar

- Port Said Sector (Port Said and Port Fouad) – Maj Gen Omar Khalid
  - 30th Independent Infantry Brigade* – Brigadier General Mohamed Salah el-Din
  - 135th Independent Infantry Brigade* – Colonel Mustafa el-'Abbassi
  - 10th Mechanised Brigade (in reserve)
- Second Field Army (Northern Canal Zone) – Maj Gen Sa'adeddin Ma'moun

Chief of Staff – Maj Gen Tayseer Aqad
Chief of Artillery – Maj Gen Mohamed Abd Al-Halim Abu Ghazala

  - 18th Infantry Division* – Brig Gen Fuad 'Aziz Ghali
    - 90th Infantry Brigade
    - 134th Infantry Brigade
    - 136th Mechanized Infantry Brigade
  - 2nd Infantry Division* – Brig Gen Hassan Abu Sa'ada
    - 4th Infantry Brigade
    - 120th Infantry Brigade
    - 117th Mechanized Infantry Brigade
  - 16th Infantry Division* – Brig Gen abd Rab el-nabi hafez
    - 16th Infantry Brigade – Abdel-Hamid Abdel-Sami
    - 112th Infantry Brigade
    - 3rd Mechanized Infantry Brigade
  - 21st Armored Division – Brig Ibrahim El-Orabi
    - 1st Armored Brigade: Mohamed Taufik Abu Shady (killed), replaced by Sayyid Saleh
    - 14th Armored Brigade*: Othman Kamel
    - 18th Mechanised Brigade: Talaat Muslim
  - 23rd Mechanised Division – Brig Gen Ahmad 'Aboud el Zommer, Hassan Abd Al-Latif
    - 24th Armored Brigade*
    - 116th Mechanised Brigade – Hussein Ridwan (killed)
    - 118th Mechanised Brigade
  - 15th Independent Armored Brigade* – Col Tahseen Shanan
- Third Field Army (Southern Canal Zone) – Maj Gen Mohamed Abd Al-Munim Wasel

Chief of Staff – Maj Gen Mustafa Shaheen
Chief of Artillery – Maj Gen Munir Shash

  - 7th Infantry Division* – Brig Gen Ahmad Badawi Said Ahmad
    - 2nd Infantry Brigade
    - 11th Mechanized Infantry Brigade
    - 8th Mechanized Infantry Brigade
  - 19th Infantry Division* – Brig Gen Yusuf Afifi Mohamed
    - 5th Infantry Brigade
    - 7th Infantry Brigade
    - 2nd Mechanized Infantry Brigade
  - 4th Armored Division – Brig Gen Mohamed Abd Al-Aziz Qabil
    - 2nd Armored Brigade
    - 3rd Armored Brigade* – Brig Noureddin Abd Al-Aziz (killed)
    - 6th Armored Brigade
  - 6th Mechanised Division – Brig Gen Mohamed AbulFath Muharam
    - 22nd Armored Brigade*
    - 113th Mechanised Brigade
    - 1st Mechanised Brigade
  - 130th Independent Amphibious Brigade – Col Mahmoud Shu'aib
  - 25th Independent Armored Brigade* – Col Ahmed Helmy Badawy
- Sa'ka Forces – Maj Gen Nabeel Shukry
  - 127th Sa'ka Group – Col Fuad Basyuni
  - 129th Sa'ka Group- Col Ali Heykal
  - 136th Sa'ka Group – Col Kamal Atiyah
  - 139th Sa'ka Group – Col Osama Ibrahim
  - 145th Sa'ka Group – Col El-Sayid Sharqawy

Most sources use Dupuy's commando brigade designations: 127, 128, 129, 130, 131, 132, and 134. But Dani Asher clearly defines six commando groups (group = brigade size). Each group contained 3 to 5 commando battalions totalling 24 battalions. He doesn't identify the groups, but from Arab sources, the following designations are available: 39, 127, 129, 136, 139, and 145.

== Israeli Defense Force ==
Minister of Defense – Lt Gen (ret.) Moshe Dayan

Chief of Staff – Lt Gen David Elazar

Deputy Chief of Staff – Maj Gen Israel Tal

Head of Operations – Maj Gen Abraham Tamir

Head of Intelligence – Maj Gen Eli Zeira

Southern Command: Maj. Gen. Shmuel Gonen

- 252nd Armored Division – Maj. Gen. Abraham 'Albert' Mandler
  - 8th Armored Brigade – Col Aryeh Dayan
  - 14th Armored Brigade – Col Amnon Reshef
  - 401st Armored Brigade – Col Dan Shomron
  - 460th Armored Brigade – Col Gabi Amir
  - 'Harel' Brigade – Col Abraham Bar-Am
  - 11th Reserve Mechanized Brigade – Col Aharon Peled

+Mechanised Infantry and Paratroop support

- 162nd Reserve Armored Division – Maj. Gen. Abraham 'Bren' Adan
  - 217th Reserve Armored Brigade – Col Natke Nir
  - 460th Armored Brigade – Col Gabi Amir
  - 500th Reserve Armored Brigade – Col Aryeh Keren

+Mechanised Infantry and Paratroop support including: 35th Paratroop Brigade – Col Uzi Yairi

- 143rd Reserve Armored Division – Maj. Gen. Ariel 'Arik' Sharon
  - 14th Armored Brigade – Col Amnon Reshef
  - 600th Reserve Armored Brigade – Col Tuvia Raviv
  - 421st Brigade – Col Haim Erez
  - 243rd Paratroop Brigade – Col Danny Matt

+Mechanized Infantry units
