= Military Medical Academy (Egypt) =

Scientific facilities affiliated with the Egyptian Armed Forces

Egyptian Military Medical Academy
- Type: military academy
- Established: 1979; 47 years ago
- Affiliations: Egyptian Armed Forces
- Location: Cairo, Egypt
- Campus: Urban

The Egyptian Military Medical Academy in Cairo is one of the scientific facilities affiliated with the Egyptian Armed Forces, which was established in 1979 to benefit from the expertise of Armed Forces doctors. It aims to train and educate medical service officers, conduct various specialized studies, and conduct medical research in various military and clinical medicine sciences.

== Academy objectives ==
Designed to align with advancements in medical science, the program provides military medical personnel with continuous academic training and professional qualifications to ensure the delivery of advanced healthcare services:

- Increasing the number and percentage of highly qualified medical officers within the armed forces
- Raising the level of proficiency in education and training for holders of higher qualifications in continuing medical education

== Affiliated institutes ==
- Military Aviation and Space Medicine Institute
- Military Health and Preventive Institute
- Institute of Marine Medicine
- Military Medical Institute

== Academy Presidents ==
- Major General Doctor / Mohamed Saad El-Din Omar (April 1979 – December 1980)
- Major General Doctor / Hussein Muhammad Badr al-Din (December 1980 – December 1983)
- Major General Doctor / Mohamed Abbas Ahmed Hamed (January 1984 – June 1985)
- Major General Doctor / Adel Amin Muhammad Amin (July 1985 – December 1986)
- Major General Doctor / Adel Ahmed Kadry (January 1987 – June 1987)
- Major General Doctor / Abdel Salam Sayed Jumaa (July 1987 – June 1989)
- Major General Doctor / Mohamed Mohamed Saqr (July 1989 – June 1991)
- Major General Doctor / Fahmy El-Sayed Ahmed (July 1991 – December 1991)
- Major General Doctor / Ismail Mahmoud Sabry (January 1992 – June 1994)
- Major General Doctor / Asaad Sameh Abdel Hadi (June 1994 – December 1994)
- Major General Doctor / Ibrahim Abdel Khaleq (January 1995 – December 1995)
- Major General Doctor / Mahmoud Sami Talaba (December 1995 – March 1996)
- Major General Doctor / Mohamed Mamdouh Mahdi (March 1996 – August 2002)
- Major General Doctor / Mohamed Mahgoub Khairy (August 2002 – August 2003)
- Major General / Abdel Salam El Shazly (September 2003 - June 2006)
- Major General Doctor / Omar Hekal (July 2006 - August 2012)
- Major General Doctor / Hesham Abdel Raouf Ali (September 2012 - December 2014).
- Major General Doctor / Ahmed Hassan Fawzy Al-Tawdi (December 2014 - April 2020).
- Major General Doctor / Ghada Salah El Manbawi (April 2020 - June 2022).
- Major General Doctor / Amin Fouad Shaker
- Major General Doctor / Tariq Raafat Al-Najdi

== Academy Boards of Directors ==
- Military Medical Academy Council
- Supreme Council of the Military Medical Academy
- Higher Specialized Medical Councils
- Board of Advisors for Various Medical Specialties

It includes all the consultants, each in his specialty, and heads of departments in teaching hospitals. It meets once every (month), where a plan is discussed and developed for training and qualifying doctors and evaluating scientific participation inside and outside the armed forces with Egyptian universities and medical associations, as well as the relations between the various hospitals and the various departments within the hospitals.

== See also ==
- Military Academy for Postgraduate and Strategic Studies
- Egyptian Military Academy
- Egyptian Armed Forces
- Armed Forces Medical Service Department (Egypt)
