= Salah Halabi =

Egyptian army officer (born 1937)

Lieutenant General Salah Mohamed Attia Halabi (Arabic: صلاح محمد عطية حلبي; January 30, 1937 – October 26, 2014) was an Egyptian Army officer. He commanded an infantry brigade, an infantry division, the Third Army, and commanded the two division corps Sized Egyptian expeditionary force to Saudi Arabia during Operation Desert Storm.

In 1989-91, the Egyptian II Corps under Halabi, at that point a major general, with the 3rd Mechanized Division and the 4th Armoured Division, fought as part of the Arab Joint Forces Command North during Operation Desert Storm. Halabi had been transferred from command of the presidential guard after the initial commander, General Ahmed Bilal, was recalled by Mubarak before the war started because of differences with the Saudi generals.

After the war, Halabi was Chief of Staff of the Armed Forces from 1991-1993, and in retirement directed the Arab Organization for Industrialization, a major weapons-manufacturing concern of Egypt.
