= Second Army (Egypt) =

Second Field Army
- Active: November 1968 – present
- Country: Egypt
- Type: Field army
- Size: approximately 120,000 active personnel
- Part of: Unified Command of the Area East of the Canal
- Headquarters: Ismailia
- Nickname: Second Army/ El-Geish el-Thany
- Colors Identification: Red, White and Black
- Anniversaries: 6 October 1973
- Engagements: War of Attrition; Yom Kippur War; Operation Badr; Sinai Insurgency

Commanders
- Army Commander: Lieutenant-General Mamdouh Jaafar
- Notable commanders: Mohamed Abdel Ghani el-Gamasy; Saad Mamoun; Fouad Aziz Ghali; Ibrahim El-Orabi; Mohammed Hussein Tantawi

The Second Field Army is a military formation of the Egyptian Army, formed in 1968. Army headquarters is at Ismailia. It is usually commanded by a field commander of lieutenant-general rank of at least 34 years' service, and reports directly to the Army General Headquarters and General Staff.

== Twentieth century ==
During the 1973 Yom Kippur War against Israel, the army commander was Lieutenant General Saad Mamoun. The army's troops crossed the Suez Canal during Operation Badr, the opening offensive of the war, along with the Third Army.

Just before the Battle of the Chinese Farm in 1973, it included on its southern flank the 21st Armoured Division commanded by Brigadier General Ibrahim El-Orabi and the 16th Infantry Division commanded by Brigadier General Abd Rab el-Nabi Hafez. In addition to being division commander Hafez also commanded forces within his division's bridgehead over the Suez Canal, which included the 21st Armoured Division. Orabi's unit included the 1st Armoured Brigade commanded by Colonel Sayed Saleh, the 14th Armoured Brigade commanded by Colonel Othman Kamel, and the 18th Mechanized Brigade commanded by Colonel Talaat Muslim. Hafez's 16th Division included the 16th Infantry Brigade, commanded by Colonel Abd el-Hamid Abd el-Sami', as well as the 116th Infantry and the 3rd Mechanised Brigades.

Trevor N. Dupuy writes the 182nd Parachute Brigade was assigned to Second Army. After the Battle of the Chinese Farm, Ismaila was under threat. The 182nd Parachute Brigade, comprising the 81st, 85th and 89th Battalions (each composed of three companies) under the command of Colonel Ismail Azmy, was assigned responsibility for defending the area south of Ismailia against an Israeli offensive. Azmy arrived at Nafisha with the bulk of his brigade at midnight on October 17, where he was briefed by Brigadier General Abd el-Munim Khalil, commander of Second Army. Khalil identified the west bank strong points as objectives for the paratroopers to secure, as the ramparts could be used to provide fire support to Egyptian forces on the east bank. The paratroopers would also hold Serabaeum and the bridges there over the Sweetwater Canal.

== Twenty-first century ==
President Mohamed Mursi attempted to strengthen his ties with the armed forces. Accompanied by Defence Minister Abdul Fatah al-Sisi, he greeted soldiers during his visit to the 6th Armoured Division of the Second Army, near Ismailia, some 75 miles north of Cairo, on October 10, 2012.

In mid-2015, Second Army elements stationed in Ismailia were deployed to Sheikh Zuweid to combat the Sinai Insurgency. It is assigned to defend the Northern Suez Canal.

== Operation Badr Order of Battle, 1973 ==
See Dani Asher, The Egyptian Strategy for the Yom Kippur War: An Analysis, 2009, p.11

- Second Field Army (Northern Canal Zone) - Maj Gen Sa'adeddin Ma'moun

Chief of Staff - Maj Gen Tayseer Aqad
Chief of Artillery - Maj Gen Abd Al-Halim Abu-Ghazala

- 18th Infantry Division* - Brig Gen Fuad 'Aziz Ghali
  - 90th Infantry Brigade
  - 134th Infantry Brigade
  - 136th Mechanized Infantry Brigade
- 2nd Infantry Division* - Brig Gen Hassan Abu Sa'ada
  - 4th Infantry Brigade
  - 120th Infantry Brigade
  - 117th Mechanized Infantry Brigade
- 16th Infantry Division* - Brig Gen Abd Rab el-Nabi Hafez
  - 16th Infantry Brigade - Abdel-Hamid Abdel-Sami
  - 112th Infantry Brigade
  - 3rd Mechanized Infantry Brigade
- 21st Armored Division - Brig Ibrahim El-Orabi
  - 1st Armored Brigade: Mohamed Taufik Abu Shady (killed), replaced by Sayyid Saleh
  - 14th Armored Brigade*: Othman Kamel
  - 18th Mechanised Brigade: Talaat Muslim
- 23rd Mechanised Division - Brig Gen Ahmad 'Aboud El Zommer (Killed), Hassan Abdel-Latif
  - 24th Armored Brigade*
  - 116th Mechanised Brigade - Hussein Ridwan (killed)
  - 118th Mechanised Brigade
- 15th Independent Armored Brigade* - Col Tahseen Shanan

== Formations in 2018 ==
The attachment of the 18th Mechanised Division to the Second Field Army was verified in April 2023.

- Headquarters (Ismailia)
  - 6th Armoured Division, headquarters in Ismailia
  - 7th Mechanized Division
  - 16th Mechanized Division
    - 3rd Mechanized Infantry Brigade
    - 16th Mechanized Infantry Brigade
    - 57th Armored Brigade
    - 41st Medium Range Artillery Brigade.
  - 18th Mechanized Division
    - A Divisional artillery brigade
- Independent 135th Mechanized Infantry brigade
- Two Independent Long Range Artillery brigades
- Three Engineer brigades (bridges, construction, and water)

== List of Commanders ==
- Mohammed Farag Shahat (March 2014 - April 2015).
- Ahmed Wasfi (July 2012 - March 2014).
- Mohammed Farid Hegazy (July 2010 - July 2012).
- Imbabi (January 2009 - July 2010).
- Abraham Nsouha (January 2008 - January 2009).
- Ahmed Hussein Mustafa (January 2006 - January 2008).
- Mustafa Ahmed al-Sayed (September 2004 - January 2006).
- Abdul Jalil Fakhrani (December 2001 - September 2004).
- Sabri (November 1999 - December 2001).
- Hamdi Wahiba (1991 - November 1999) (promoted to lieutenant general and served as Chief of Staff of the Armed Forces).
- Magdi Hatata (1991 - 1993) (promoted to lieutenant general and served as Chief of Staff of the Armed Forces).
- Mohammed Hussein Tantawi (1987 - 1988) (later promoted to field marshal and served as Minister of Defense).
- Safi al-Din Abu Hnav (1981-1983) (served as Chief of Staff of the Armed Forces).
- Ahmed Salahuddin Abdul Halim (1981 - 1983) (promoted to lieutenant general).
- Ibrahim El-Orabi (1979 - 1981) (promoted to lieutenant general and served as Chief of Staff of the Armed Forces).
- Fouad Aziz Ghali (Command began in December 1973 - 1980, later promoted to lieutenant general).
- Abdel Moneim Khalil (The second period from October 16, 1973 - December 1973).
- Saad Mamoun (January 1972 - October 16, 1973) (Promoted to lieutenant general).
- Abdel Moneim Khalil (The first period from September 1969 - January 1972)
- Ahmed Abdul Salam Tawfik (March 9, 1969 - September 1969).
- Adli Said (Command ended on March 9, 1969).
- Ahmad Ismail Ali (the first commander of the Second Army from November 1968 - March 1969) (Later Army Chief of Staff, Chief of Intelligence, Minister of Defense and promoted to Field Marshal).

== See also ==
- Operation Badr order of battle
