= Kerdasa raid =

Raid in Egypt

Battle of Kerdasa
- Part of the Post-coup unrest in Egypt
| Date | 19 September 2013 |
| Location | Kerdasa and Nahya, Egypt |
| Result | Government victory |

Belligerents
| (Egypt) Police (Egypt) Military: CSF | Pro-Muslim Brotherhood militants Al-Gamaa Al-Islamiya |

Casualties and losses
| 1 police general killed 10 injured | 65–85 arrested |

The raid on Kerdasa (Arabic: معركة كرداسة) took place on 19 September 2013 in Kerdasa, when Egyptian security forces stormed the town to cleanse it from alleged terrorist spots. The operation was in response to an earlier massacre on 14 August that year, when protesters attacked a police station killing eleven security personnel shortly after the Egyptian security forces had launched a violent crackdown and massacre on two protest camps in Cairo where hundreds of supporters of ousted Egyptian president Mohamed Morsi were killed. The raid came a few days after a similar operation in Minya's town of Dalga, and was part of a larger crackdown by the interim government on armed supporters of deposed President Mohamed Morsi.

== Background ==
Kerdasa is a notable touristic location in Egypt, known for its textile industry, and is the biggest town in the Giza Governorate. However, some extremist Islamic movements have also been linked to it as well as neighboring Nahya. It became an Islamist stronghold once again following Mohamed Morsi's election in 2012, and after the 2013 coup d'état that ousted Morsi, the town started harboring extremist elements wanted by the government. These cells became even more active there following the violent dispersal and massacre of pro-Morsi sit-ins in Cairo. Kerdasa was declared an Islamic state after it became under full control by the Islamists following the police station attack that killed eleven security officials.

== Events ==
The operation in Kerdasa had been delayed in order to gather additional and conclusive intelligence on the insurgents’ hideouts, according to Giza's security chief Maj. Gen. Kamal al-Daly in a statement to the Lebanese daily As-Safir. A large combined force of military and police officers backed by helicopters besieged the town and set up checkpoints by blocking all main exits with armed vehicles, as security forces started to make their move.

The troops entered the town at about 05:30 local time (03:30 GMT) and used loudspeakers urging residents to stay indoors to avoid the crossfire. They were exposed to heavy gunfire shortly afterwards, forcing them to cover behind buildings along with photographers and journalists who were accompanying them. The shots came from rooftops of houses, schools and mosques. Maj. Gen. Nabil Farrag was the only person killed during the battle after being shot in the chest by the gunmen. Ten policemen were injured with shrapnel wounds in various parts of their bodies during two separate grenade attacks and live television footage showed dense smoke clouds hovering above the sites of clashes. Gen. al-Daly added that a stormtrooper division helped the special forces seize control of the city center, while the Central Security Forces worked to prevent the insurgents from escaping.

Security forces exchanged fire with the militants as they conducted house-to-house searches for wanted Islamist hardliners. In one raid, special forces stormed a villa belonging to a man they claimed to have orchestrated the previous police station attack. They were supported by police armoured vehicles that smashed down the compound's gates before breaking in, but the man wasn't there. Waves of arrests were carried out and in total, between 65 and 85 people, including three main suspects in August's attack, were detained in response to 150 arrest warrants made for involved suspects in the earlier killings. In addition, the Interior Ministry stated that dozens of weapons, including three rocket-propelled grenades and several automatic firearms.

There was also spillover fighting in the neighboring village of Nahya, that was subsequently besieged by security forces who conducted raids similar to Kerdasa's on wanted suspects' homes. They were also looking for Al-Gamaa Al-Islamiya leader Tarek al-Zomor, who was thought to be hiding there. Television footage showed heavy gunfire as the police chased a group of men into side streets.

== Reactions ==
Gehad El-Haddad, spokesman of the Muslim Brotherhood criticized the military's move comparing it with Mubarak era tactics. "When you go home and you watch TV and they are calling you a terrorist and your leadership is locked up, you may join your neighbors and do something dangerous," he said.

Ahmed Ali, spokesman of the Egyptian Armed Forces stated that the military had to quell the militants. "When dealing with terrorism, the consideration of civil and human rights are not applicable. There is an insurgency already and it's increasing. They are killing people in the streets," he said in a press statement.

== Trial ==
On 6 August 2014, twelve detainees were sentenced to death and other 9 were sent to prison for life over killing Major General Nabil Farag.
