= Saad Mamoun =

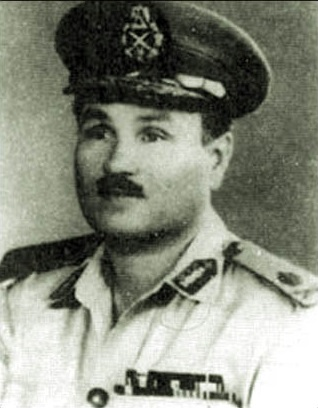
- General Saad Maamoun 1972
- Born: Mohammed Sa'ad Ma'moun; 14 May 1922; Alexandria, Egypt
- Died: 28 October 2000 (aged 78)
- Military career
- Allegiance: Egypt
- Branch: Egyptian Army
- Service years: 1943–1983
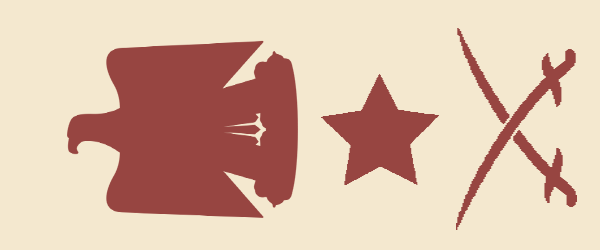
- Rank: Lieutenant General
- Unit: 11th Infantry Regiment
- Commands: 17th Mechanized Division (1968–1972); Second Field Army (1972–1975); Central Military Zone (1975–1979); Director of Military Operations Staff and Assistant Minister of Defence for Morale Affairs(1979–1983).
- Conflicts: Suez Crisis; Six-Day War; Yom Kippur War

Lieutenant General Mohammed Saad Eddin Mamoun, popularly known as Saad Mamoun (14 May 1922 – 28 October 2000), was an Egyptian military officer and war hero who was the commander of the Egyptian Second Army during the Yom Kippur War. He was commissioned in an infantry regiment in 1943 after graduating from the Egyptian Military Academy. He was wounded in action during the Suez War in 1956 as the commander of an infantry anti-Tank battalion. Along with Mohamed Abdel Ghani el-Gamasy, Hosni Mubarak, Helmy Afify Abd El-Bar and Kamal Hassan Ali, he was one of the heavyweight and close members of President Sadat's inner circle.

During the 1977 Egyptian bread riots, as commander of the Central Military Region, he is known to have refused to use deadly force against protestors in Cairo and to convince President Sadat to accede to some of the popular demands such as continuation of food and energy subsidies. After he retired from the Egyptian Army, he served as Governor of Cairo until 1983.
