= Abdul Munim Wassel =

Egyptian general (1927–2002)

Abdel Munim Wassel
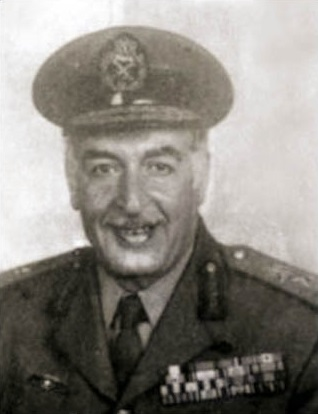
- Born: December 30, 1927; Kingdom of Egypt
- Died: May 17, 2002 (aged 74); Egypt
- Education: Cairo University
- Military career
- Allegiance: Kingdom of Egypt; Republic of Egypt; United Arab Republic; Egypt
- Branch: Egyptian Army
- Rank: Major General
- Commands: 3rd Army
- Conflicts: World War II; 1948 Palestine War; Suez Crisis; Six-Day War; Yom Kippur War

Major General Abdel Munim Wassel (Arabic: عبد المنعم واصل; 30 December 1927 – 17 May 2002) was an Egyptian military officer who was the commander of the Egyptian Third Army during the Yom Kippur War.
