= Osama Askar =

Egyptian Army officer (born 1957)

- اسامة عسكر
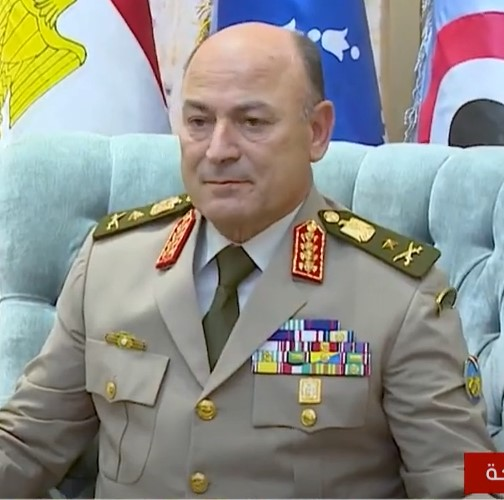
- Born: Mohammed Osama Askar; 17 April 1957 (age 69); Dakahlia, Egypt
- Military career
- Allegiance: Egypt
- Branch: Egyptian Army
- Service years: 1978–present
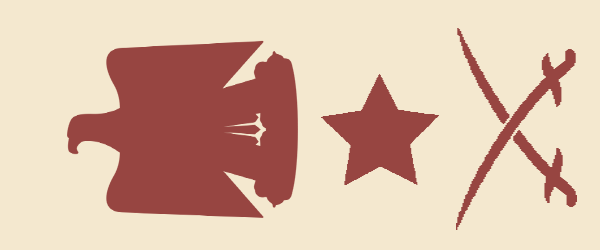
- Rank: Lieutenant General
- Unit: 11th Infantry Regiment
- Commands: 141st Special Forces Regiment (2002–2005); 110th Independent Mechanized Brigade (2005–2009); 23rd Mechanized Division (2010–2013); Third Field Army (2013–2015)

Lieutenant General Osama Askar (Arabic: اسامة عسكر; born 17 April 1957) is an Egyptian Army officer. He commands the Unified Command of the area east of the canal.

Askar was born in 1957 and attended the Nasser Military Academy. He has commanded a mechanized infantry brigade and the 23rd Mechanised Infantry Division, part of the Third Army. Up until 2015 he commanded the Third Field Army.

President Abdel Fattah el-Sisi issued two declarations in January 2015. The first changed the force structure of the army by creating a "unified command" to oversee counterterrorism operations east of the Suez Canal. The new command was created on Saturday, 31 January 2015. The second promoted Osama Askar, Third Army commander, to lieutenant general—one of a handful in the armed forces—and placed him in charge of the "unified command." He retained his seat on the Supreme Council of the Armed Forces. Askar's former deputy, Muhammad Abdullah, was appointed commander, and Tarek Anwar Helal the chief of staff, of the Third Field Army. On 27 October 2021, Askar was appointed Chief of the General Staff.
