= International Medical Center (Egypt) =

International Medical Center المركز الطبي العالمي
- Armed Forces Medical Service Department (Egypt)

Geography
- Location: El Shorouk, Cairo Governorate, Egypt
- Coordinates: 30.193759°N 31.656105°E

Organisation
- Type: Military hospital

Services
- Beds: 800

History
- Opened: 2005

Links
- Website: www.imceg.com

The International Medical Center (IMC) is Military hospital in El Shorouk city, Cairo Governorate, Egypt. The IMC is one of the largest tertiary health care hospitals in the Middle East. The IMC is part of the Armed Forces Medical Service Department in the Egyptian Armed Forces. The IMC, is an Egyptian hospital with a wide range of services provided by a high standard team. It is situated in El Shorouk city in Cairo - Ismailia Desert Road at km 42. away from city pollution. The IMC was established by the Egyptian Armed Forces with American expertise and cooperation from the US Army Corps of Engineers.

== History ==
It started operating in 2005. The IMC hospital has 800 Beds, 63 ICU Beds and 24 Operating Rooms. IMC is adapting to an International standard of patient care, not for profit, utilizing Egyptian and American patient care team management. IMC Provides health care services in Egypt to local and international patients.

== Specialities ==
The IMC provides care for various medicine and surgery specialties (more than 100 consultants and specialists). The IMC has more than 10 'centers of excellence' in Medical care.

Major areas include: a cancer center (that offers all modalities of oncology management, Radiotherapy, and Chemotherapy), Geriatric medicine (Acute care, Day care and outpatient clinic), PET Scan (Early detection for cancer), Transplantation team (Renal, Liver and Pancreas), Cardiac Surgery, Specialized Paediatrics Center & Neonatal ICU, LG & Immunology Center, Eye care Center (Laser, Gamma Knife, Surgery, Rational Diseases), Gastroenterology & Endoscopy, Neurology & Neurosurgery, Interventional Radiology department, Vascular Surgery, Gynaecology / Obstetrics, Urology & Urodynamics unit, Plastic Surgery and ENT departments.
