= Omar Hekal =

Leader of the successful campaign to eradicate hepatitis C in Egypt

Omar Heikal
- Native name: عمر هيكل
- Born: c. 1950s Kafr El-Zayyat, Gharbia Governorate, Egypt
- Allegiance: Egypt
- Branch: Egyptian Armed Forces
- Rank: Major General (Medical)
- Commands: President of the Egyptian Military Medical Academy (2006–2012)
- Awards: Order of the Republic (Second Class); Medal of Exemplary Conduct; Ideal Physician Award
- Alma mater: Ain Shams University (M.B.B.Ch, 1971; M.Sc. Gastroenterology, 1979; Ph.D. Hepatology, 1988)

Omar Heikal is an Egyptian military physician and hepatologist who served as President of the Egyptian Military Medical Academy from July 2006 until August 2012. He was a leading member of the National Committee for Combating Viral Hepatitis and successfully led the campaign to eradicate hepatitis C in Egypt. He earned his M.B.B.Ch. from Ain Shams University in 1971, an M.Sc. in Gastroenterology (first in class) in 1979, and a Ph.D. in Hepatology in 1988, and completed a fellowship at the Royal Free Hospital, University College London, under Prof Sheila Sherlock.

== Early life and education ==
Omar Heikal was born in the 1950s in Kafr El-Zayyat, Gharbia Governorate, into a family of engineers and educators. He graduated with an M.B.B.Ch. from Ain Shams University School of Medicine in 1971, followed by an M.Sc. in Gastroenterology (first in class) in 1979 and a Ph.D. in Hepatology in 1988, both from Ain Shams University.

== Military and academic career ==
Upon graduation, Heikal joined the Egyptian Armed Forces Medical Services, serving at Maadi, Qubra and Gamra military hospitals. In July 2006, he was appointed President of the Egyptian Military Medical Academy, a post he held until August 2012. Under his leadership, the Academy’s research output increased substantially and international collaborations were forged, notably hosting the Third International Military Medical Conference in November 2008.

== Role in hepatitis C elimination ==
Egypt launched its national hepatitis C elimination program “100 Million Healthy Lives” aimed at mass screening and treatment. Major General Heikal served on the National Committee for Control of Viral Hepatitis, negotiating procurement of direct-acting antivirals at discounts up to 1/1000 of U.S. prices and facilitating local generic production. By 2018, over 4 million Egyptians had received a full three-month course of sofosbuvir-based therapy at a subsidized cost of EGP 1,400, reducing prevalence from approximately 14% to under 1% by 2021.

=== Collaborative leadership ===
Heikal’s efforts were coordinated with senior officers of the Military Medical Academy, including Major General Ghada Salah El-Manbawi, Major General Hisham Abdul Raouf, Major General Ahmed Fawzy Tawdi, and Major General Amin Fouad Shaker, who oversaw regional treatment centers, public-awareness campaigns, and the deployment of mobile screening units.

== Later career ==
After leaving the academy, Heikal established a private gastroenterology and hepatology practice, where he continues to see patients. He also holds guest-lecturer status in Internal Medicine at Ain Shams University Faculty of Medicine.

== Honors and awards ==
- Order of the Republic (Second Class) for outstanding service in public health
- Medal of Exemplary Conduct, Egyptian Armed Forces
- Ideal Physician Award, Egyptian Medical Syndicate

== Personal life ==
Heikal is married to Professor Omima Mohamed Hassan, Professor of Pharmacology at Ain Shams University; they have two daughters.
