= Kerdasa massacre =

Killing of several security personnel in August 2013 in a town in Giza

- Part of the Post-coup unrest in Egypt
- Location: Kerdasa, Giza, Egypt
- Date: 14 August 2013
- Target: Egyptian National Police
- Attack type: Mass murder
- Weapons: AK-47s, Machine guns, RPG-7s
- Deaths: 12 policemen, 2 civilians
- Perpetrator: Militants

The Kerdasa massacre refers to the killing of twelve Egyptian security personnel in August 2013 in Kerdasa's main police station, a town in Giza.

== The attack ==
On 14 August 2013, shortly after the Egyptian security forces launched a violent crackdown and massacre on two protest camps in Cairo where hundreds of supporters of ousted Egyptian president Mohamed Morsi were killed, more than fifty militants stormed the police station of Kerdasa killing 12 officers and 2 civilians.

According to the criminal investigation reports, about 50 militants and Bedouins militants besieged the station for more than 5 hours, before some masked men shot at the complex with RPGs. The victims' bodies showed signs of torture that might have led to their deaths and others were mutilated. The attackers later moved to the town's only church, chased out the people praying inside, torched it and later painted "we will show you rage and we will make you see terrorism" on one of the building's charred walls.

== Aftermath ==
On 19 September 2013, as a response to the attack, the Egyptian National Police stormed the village where they clashed with militants. Giza's deputy security chief, Major General Nabil Farrag, was killed during gunfire exchange between the police and the militants. The operation was aired on national television. A daytime curfew was announced during the raid while security officers were searching for the wanted. The police arrested 156 people. They were referred to court over the killings with charges of terrorism, murder, damaging public property and possession of weapons.

On 2 July 2017, the Cairo Criminal court sentenced 20 defendants to death, 80 defendants to life in prison, 34 defendants to 15 years imprisonment, a minor to ten years, and acquitted 21 defendants.

Nine defendants convicted for their role in the massacre were executed by hanging at Wadi el-Natrun prison on April 26, 2021.

== See also ==
- Sinai insurgency
- Terrorism in Egypt
