= Egyptian Border Guard Corps =

Egyptian Border Guard قوات حرس الحدود
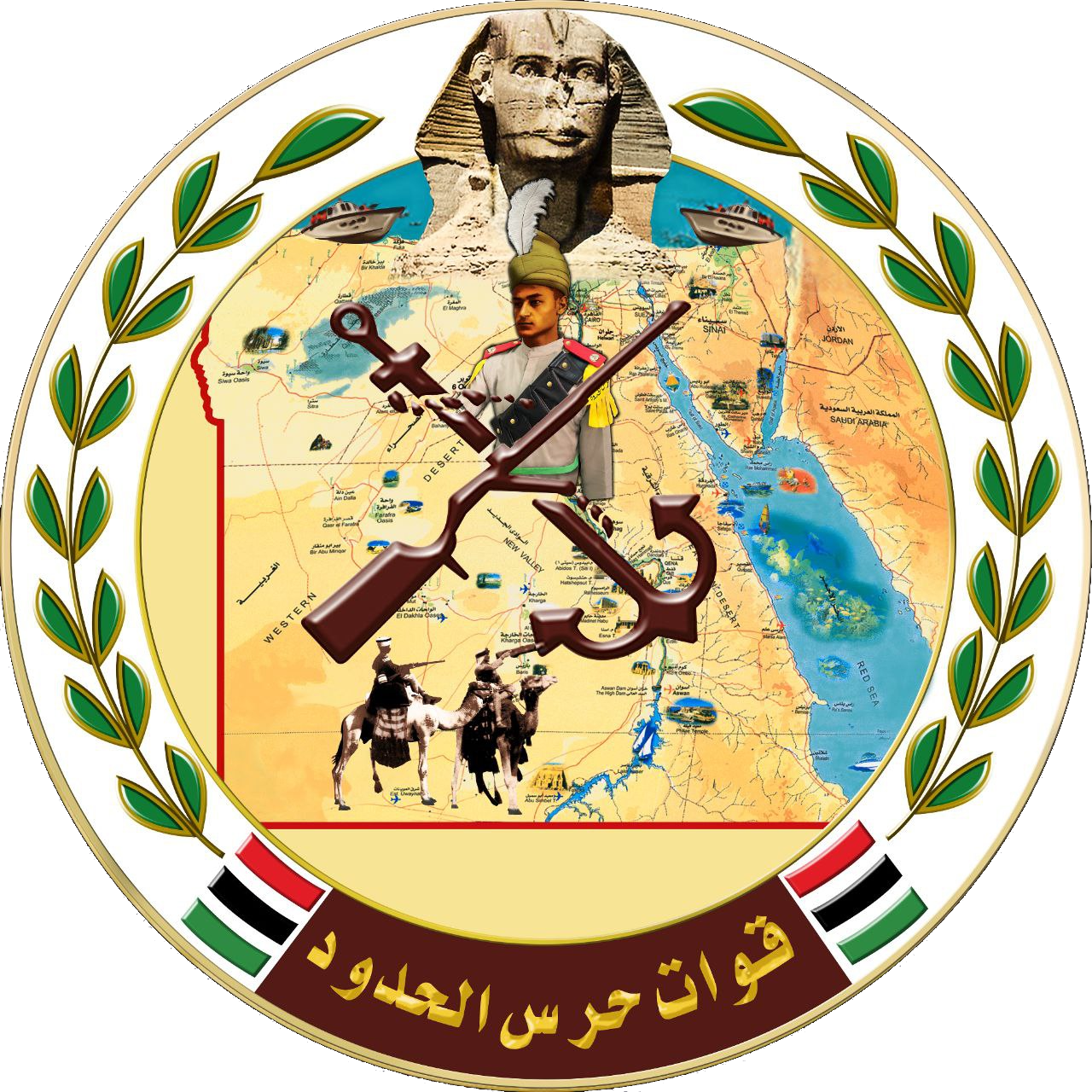
- Honesty . Honour . Sacrifice

Agency overview
- Formed: 1878
- Employees: 25,000 (2020)

Jurisdictional structure
- Operations jurisdiction: Egypt
- Specialist jurisdiction: National border patrol, security, integrity

Operational structure
- Agency executive: Major-General Mohamed Ezeldin Gahwash, Commander
- Parent agency: Egyptian Army

The Border Guard Corps (Arabic: قوات حرس الحدود, romanized: Quwwāt Ḥaras al-Ḥudūd, lit. 'Border Guard Forces') is a militarised corps subordinate to the Egyptian Army. It is tasked with the protection of Egypt's land and sea borders. The corps is in charge of protecting the Suez Canal and stopping the movement of illegal immigrants, smuggling, human trafficking, and illegal narcotics into and out of Egypt.

As of 2020, the corps fell under the control of the Ministry of Interior. According to the IISS Military Balance 2020, it comprised an estimated 25,000, in 18 border regiments, with light weapons only.

In total, the Border Guards are responsible for securing over 6000 km of land and sea borders. They work in cooperation with the Egyptian Armed Forces to counter infiltration.

The Border Guards have a particular responsibility in securing the 13 km Gaza Strip border where thousands of tunnels have brought in narcotics, weapons, and militants into the Sinai Desert.

== History ==
Originally founded as the Frontier Corps in 1878, in 1917, under the administration of Sultan Hussein Kamel, the Department of Border and Coastal Management was created a sub-department of the Ministry of Finance, and under it the Border Guard was founded.

In 1939, the Coast Guard was separated into the Ministry of War, later forming the basis for the founding of the modern Egyptian Navy.

The Egyptian Border Guard participated in World War II including stopping the sabotage of Matrouh-Alexandria railway in the Fukah region by German soldiers and shot down an axis plane and apprehended it's pilot.

Before the June 1967 War, the army divided its personnel into four regional commands (Suez, Sinai, Nile Delta, and Nile Valley up to the Sudan). The remainder of Egypt's territory, over 75%, was the sole responsibility of the Frontier Corps.

In the Six Day War, the Egyptian Border Guard intercepted and captured Israeli frogmen in the Port of Alexandria as well as supporting the retreat of Egyptian troops from Sinai using fishing boats and taking part in the battle of Ras Aleishi.

On 6 July 1972, the Command of the Border Guard was created from the merging of the other departments and was given to the Army, rejoining the Coast Guard and Border Guard.

== Notable Former Members ==
Veto Gate lists the following as former members of the Guard:

- President Mohamed Naguib
  - Commander of the Border Brigade from 1942 to 1943
  - Director of the Royal Border Force from 1950 to 1952
- President Mohamed Anwar El-Sadat
  - Officer in the Signal Border Battalion from 1941 to 1942
- Minister of Information Mohamed Abdel-Qader Hatem
  - Served at the border administration from 1940 to 1945
- Minister of Defense Mohamed Abdel-Ghani El-Gamasy
  - Intelligence officer for the border administration from 1941 to 1945
  - Assistant Director for Intelligence at the border administration from 1952 to 1954
