= East Military Canal Zone (Egypt) =

Unified Command of the Area East of the Canal
- Active: 2015–present
- Country: Egypt
- Branch: Egyptian Army
- Type: Military Region
- Role: Counter-Terrorism
- Colors: Red, White and Black

Commanders
- Current commander: Osama Askar

The Unified Command of the Area East of the Canal is an Egyptian military formation that was created to combat the terrorism and insurgency in the Sinai. It is one of the five major military regions of the Egyptian Army. It groups the Second Field Army and the Third Field Army. A presidential Decree from Abdel Fattah al-Sisi appointed the command's first commander, Lieutenant General Osama Askar. The command was created to improve cooperation and unity of command and coordination between the Second and Third field armies.

President Abdel Fattah el-Sisi chaired a meeting of the Supreme Council of the Armed Forces in January 2015, during which he issued two declarations. The first changed the force structure of the army by creating a "unified command" to oversee counterterrorism operations east of the Suez Canal. The second promoted Osama Askar, commander of the Third Field Army, both in rank and in title: he is now a lieutenant general—one of a handful in the armed forces—and in charge of the "unified command." He will also retain his seat on the SCAF. Askar's former deputy, Muhammad Abdullah, has been appointed commander, and Tarek Anwar Helal the chief of staff, of the Third Field Army.

Nasr 13 was the first manoeuvre of its type since the eastern zone was placed under a unified command. The manoeuvre began with Egyptian forces carrying out a mock pre-emption of two major attacks planned by Ansar Beit Al-Maqdis, with Islamic State (IS) support, in retaliation for Egypt's aerial assault against IS strongholds in Libya. The message Nasr 13 was intended to convey was summed up by Sobhi when he referred to the Egyptian Armed Forces’ levels of “preparedness and readiness to carry out their assigned tasks in order to defend the Egyptian people.”

== Structure ==
=== HQ, Eastern Military Region: El Suez ===
==== Second Army ====
- Field HQ, Port Said, Northern Suez Canal Military Region
- Field HQ, Ismaelia, Central Suez Canal Military Region
- Field HQ, El Mansoura, El Daqahliya, Eastern Delta Military Region

==== Third Army ====
- Field HQ, El Suez, Southern Suez Canal Military Region
- Field HQ, Cairo-Suez Highway Military Region
- Field HQ, Hurghada, Red Sea Military Region
