= Ibrahim El-Orabi =

Egyptian lieutenant general (1931–2019)

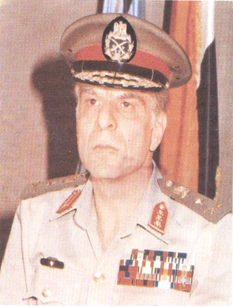
- Nickname: "El-Fareeq El-Orabi"
- Born: Ibrahim El-Orabi; 20 May 1931; El-Gharbeyya, Kingdom of Egypt
- Died: 18 September 2019 (aged 88) Al-Qahira, Egypt
- Allegiance: Kingdom of Egypt (1941-53); Republic of Egypt (1953-58); United Arab Republic (1958-72); Egypt (1972-84); Egypt (1984-present)
- Branch: Egyptian Army
- Service years: 1950–1987
- Rank: Lieutenant General
- Commands: Chief of the General Staff; Chief of Operations of the Armed Forces; Commander of the Second Field Army; Commander of the 21st Armored Division; Commander of the Arab Forces in Iraq; Commander of the Armored Corps in Yemen war
- Conflicts: Suez Crisis; 17 July Revolution; North Yemen Civil War; Six-Day War; War of Attrition; Yom Kippur War; Battle of the Chinese Farm
- Awards: Order of the Republic, First Class – 1987; Order of the Republic, First Class – 1995; Exceptional Promotion Medal; Medal of Long Service and Good Example; Medal of Excellence Service; Medal of Military Duty, Second Class; Medal of Military Courage, First Class – 1973; Medal of Military Duty, First Class; Liberation Order; Commemorative Medal of the Formation of the United Arab Republic; Military Evacuation Medal; Military Independence Medal; Victory Medal; Sinai Liberation Medal – 25 April; Training Medal, First Class; The Medal of Army Day; 10th Anniversary of the Revolution Medal; 20th Anniversary of the Revolution; 6th of October 1973 Medal; 6th of October 73 Fighters Medal; Crossing Star Medal of Libya; Order of Iraq; Order of Zaire; Order of United States; Order of Cameroon

Ibrahim Abdul Ghafour El-Orabi (Arabic: إبراهيم عبد الغفور العرابي, Arabic: [ˈʔɪbrahiːm ʕæbdel ˈɣafuːɾ el ʕoɾæːbi]); (May 20, 1931 - September 17, 2019) was the Chief of the General Staff of the Armed Forces (Egyptian Arabic: رئيس أركان حرب القوات المسلحة, romanized: Rayiys 'arkan harb alquaat almusalaha) from 1983 to 1987.

Ibrahim El-Orabi was a member of the Free Officers (Arabic: حركة الضباط الأحرار, romanized: Ḥarakat al-dubbāṭ al-ʾaḥrār), as defined by the Egyptian revolution of 1952. He served as the chief of operations of the Armed Forces, Commander of the Second Field Army, Commander of the 21st Armoured Division, Commander of the Arab Forces in the 17 July Revolution (Arabic: انقلاب 17 تموز, romanized: inqilāb 17 Tammūz), and as Commander of the Egyptian Armoured Corps, which was deployed in the North Yemen civil war, also known in Yemen as the 26 September Revolution. (Note: Arabic: ثورة 26 سبتمبر, romanized: Thawrat 26 Sibtambar)

As the Chief of the General Staff of the Armed Forces, Orabi was the second-in-command of the Egyptian Armed Forces, following the Minister of Defense and the President.

== Early life ==
Orabi was born in Gharbia in 1931 into a politically prominent family. His uncles included Ali Zaki El Orabi Pasha, who served as Minister of Public Knowledge and Minister of Transportation and Communications, and later as Speaker of the Parliament of Egypt from 7 May 1942 to 19 December 1944 and again from 17 June 1950 to 10 December 1952 during the reign of King Farouk I. Other uncles were the journalist Mahmoud Hosni El-Orabi, leader of the Egyptian Socialist Party in 1915, and the engineer Mahmoud Bek El Orabi, one of the senior leaders of al-Kutla Party (Arabic: حزب الكتلة, romanized: Hizb al-Kutla) and the first Egyptian Director of Property at the Ministry of Public Works and Irrigation. His siblings included Nabil El-Orabi, a former Egyptian ambassador to Russia, and his nephews included Mohamed Orabi, former Egyptian Minister of Foreign Affairs.

== Education ==
Orabi received a Bachelor of Military Science from Egyptian Military Academy in 1950, a Master of Science from The M. V. Frunze Military Academy (Russian: Военная академия имени М. В. Фрунзе), and a Master of Science from the College of Military Commanders and Staff. He also earned a PhD in military science from The Military Academy for Postgraduate and Strategic Studies (Egyptian Arabic: الأكاديمية العسكرية للدراسات العليا والاستراتيجية), formerly Nasser Military Academy (Egyptian Arabic: أكاديمية ناصر للعلوم العسكرية, and was a Fellow of the Higher War College.

== Personal life ==
While serving as a first lieutenant in 1952 at the age of 21, Orabi married Mrs. Laila Koura. The marriage lasted 59 years until her death in 2011. The couple had three children:

1. Mrs. Khadija El-Orabi
2. The late Rear Admiral Khaled El-Orabi, former Deputy Chief of The General Intelligence Service (Arabic: جهاز المخابرات العامة (died in 2011 while performing Umrah)
3. Major General Tarek El-Orabi, former Deputy Director of The General Intelligence Service (Arabic: جهاز المخابرات العامة

== Military education ==
- 1950 Bachelor of Military Science degree, Military Science from Egyptian Military Academy
- 1961 Master of Military Art and Science degree, The M. V. Frunze Military Academy (Russian: Военная академия имени М. В. Фрунзе)
- 1972 PhD of Military Science, Joint Command and Staff College, Cairo, Egypt
- 1977 Fellowship of the Higher War College, The Military Academy for Postgraduate and Strategic Studies (Egyptian Arabic: الأكاديمية العسكرية للدراسات العليا والاستراتيجية), formerly Nasser Military Academy (Egyptian Arabic: أكاديمية ناصر للعلوم العسكرية

== Dates of rank ==
| Rank | Date |
|---|---|
| Lieutenant general | 1983 |
| Major general | 1977 |
| Brigadier general | 1971 |
| Colonel | N/A* |
| Lieutenant colonel | 1964 |
| Major | 1960 |
| Captain | 1954 |
| First lieutenant | 1951 |
| Lieutenant | 1950 |

== Career ==
In 1950, Orabi began his service in the Egyptian Armoured Corps. He later joined the Free Officers (Arabic: حركة الضباط الأحرار, romanized: Ḥarakat al-dubbāṭ al-ʾaḥrār) and took part in the Egyptian revolution of 1952.

Between 1963 and 1967, Orabi held key posts as Commander of the Arab Forces in Iraq 17 July Revolution (Arabic: انقلاب 17 تموز, romanized: inqilāb 17 Tammūz) and Commander of the Armored Corps in North Yemen civil war, also known in Yemen as the 26 September Revolution, after which he was appointed to the Field Marshal's Office.

In 1968, Orabi was sent on a training assignment. He later became Vice President of Operations of the Second Field Army and, shortly afterward, was appointed Commander of the 21st Armoured Division.

From 1977 to 1981, Orabi was promoted to Major General and appointed Assistant Commander of the Second Field Army. He later served as the army's Chief of Staff before becoming its Commander.

On 4 March 1981, General Orabi was nominated by President Anwar Sadat to serve as chief of operations of the Armed Forces following a helicopter crash in the Siwa area of the Western Military Region near Marsa Matrouh, in which Field Marshal Ahmed Badawi and thirteen other senior military commanders were killed. In 1982, he was appointed Assistant Minister of Defense.

On 16 July 1983, President Hosni Mubarak nominated Orabi as the Chief of the General Staff of the Armed Forces (Egyptian Arabic: رئيس أركان حرب القوات المسلحة, romanized: Rayiys 'arkan harb alquaat almusalaha), and promoted him to the rank of Lieutenant general. Orabi succeeded Army General Abd Rab el-Nabi Hafez on 16 July 1983 and served alongside General Salah Abd El Halim — the former commander of the Second Field Army — who became the next Chief of Operations of the Armed Forces.

In 1987, Orabi was appointed Chairman of the Arab Organization for Industrialization (AOI) (Arabic: الهيئة العربية للتصنيع), a position he held until his retirement in 1995.

== Military participations ==
- Suez Crisis
- 17 July Revolution (Note: Arabic: انقلاب 17 تموز, romanized: inqilāb 17 Tammūz)
- North Yemen civil war, also known in Yemen as the 26 September Revolution,
- Six-Day War
- War of Attrition
- Yom Kippur War
- Battle of the Chinese Farm

== Death ==
Lieutenant General Ibrahim El Orabi died on Wednesday, 18 September 2019, at Al-Galaa Armed Forces Medical Complex in Heliopolis, Cairo, at the age of 88. He was buried in a funeral attended by the President of Egypt and Supreme Commander of the Armed Forces Abdel Fattah el-Sisi, senior state officials, and his family. The funeral was held at the military ceremonial area of the El‑Mosheer Tantawy Mosque located in the Fifth Settlement.

== Notes ==
Military offices
| Preceded by Abd Rab el-Nabi | Chief of Staff of the Armed Forces; 1983–1987 | Succeeded by Safi al-Din Abu Shnaaf |
