= Kerdasa =

Kerdasa كرداسة ⲭⲟⲣⲧⲁⲥⲁ
- Location in Egypt
- Coordinates: 30.032021°N 31.110449°E
- Country: Egypt
- Governorate: Giza

Population
  - Total: 69,317
- Time zone: UTC+2 (EET)
  - Summer (DST): UTC+3 (EEST)

Kerdasa (Arabic: كرداسة, Arabic pronunciation: [keɾˈdæːsæ], Coptic: ⲭⲟⲣⲧⲁⲥⲁ) is a markaz in Giza Governorate, Egypt. It is famed for its hand-made textile crafts, woven carpets, and wall hangings in native traditional patterns. Kerdasa is a great place to find embroidered cotton, silk dresses (galabeyas) and other products. It is famous for trading fabrics nationwide, with traditional crafts, and handcrafted clothes and textiles, from dresses, galabiyas, etc., and is a popular destination for Egyptians before Arab and foreign tourists to purchase these products.

According to statistics in 2006, the total population of Kerdasa was 69,317 people, including 35,519 men and 33,798 women. The name "Kerdasa" was adopted from a Berber tribe, who still exist in the town with the same name, who migrated as conquerors during the Habib migration.

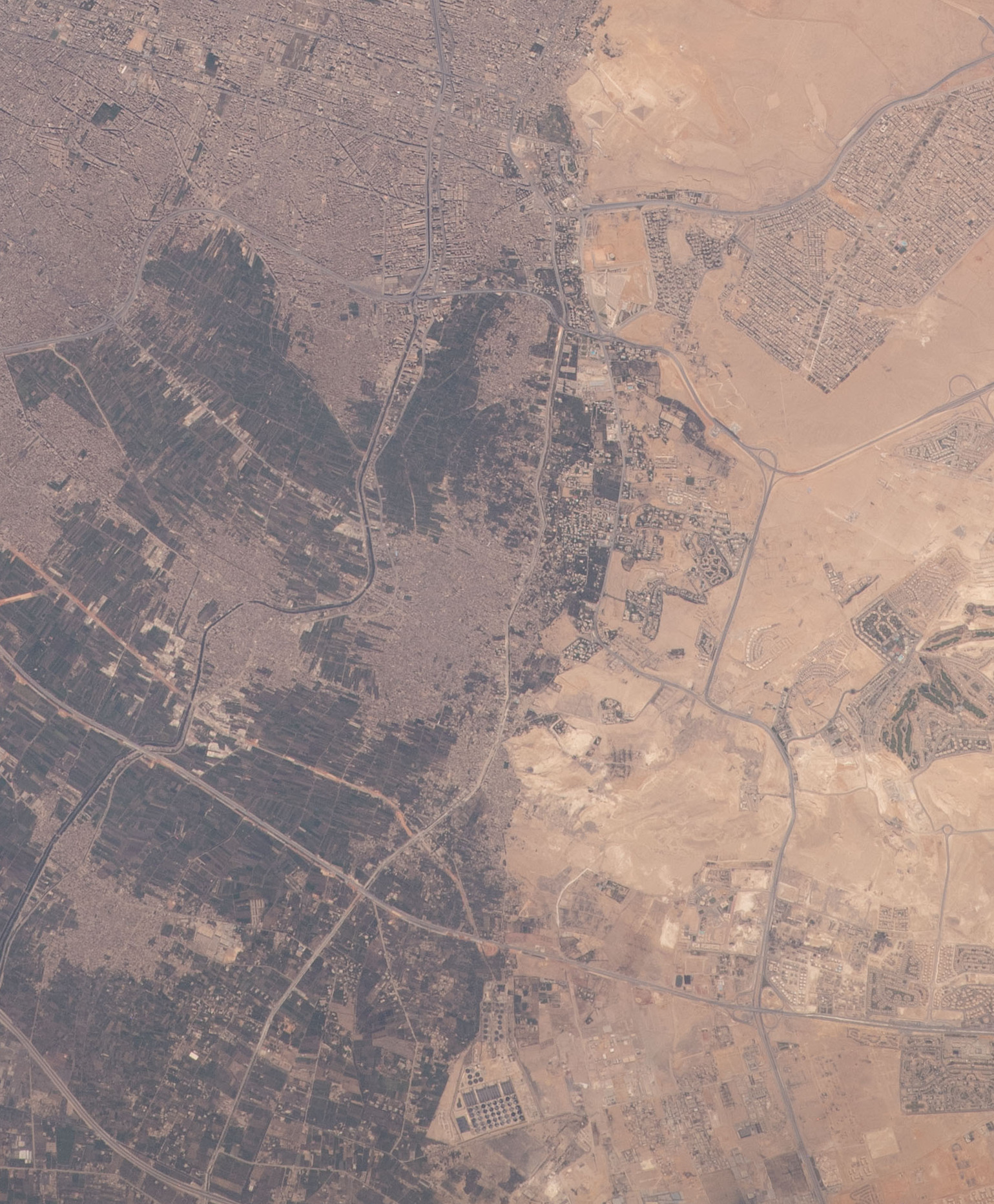
Kerdasa (middle), Gizeh pyramids and Giza from above. Abu Rawash
