= Armed Forces Medical Service Department (Egypt) =

Armed Forces Medical Services Department
- إدارة الخدمات الطبية بالقوات المسلحة
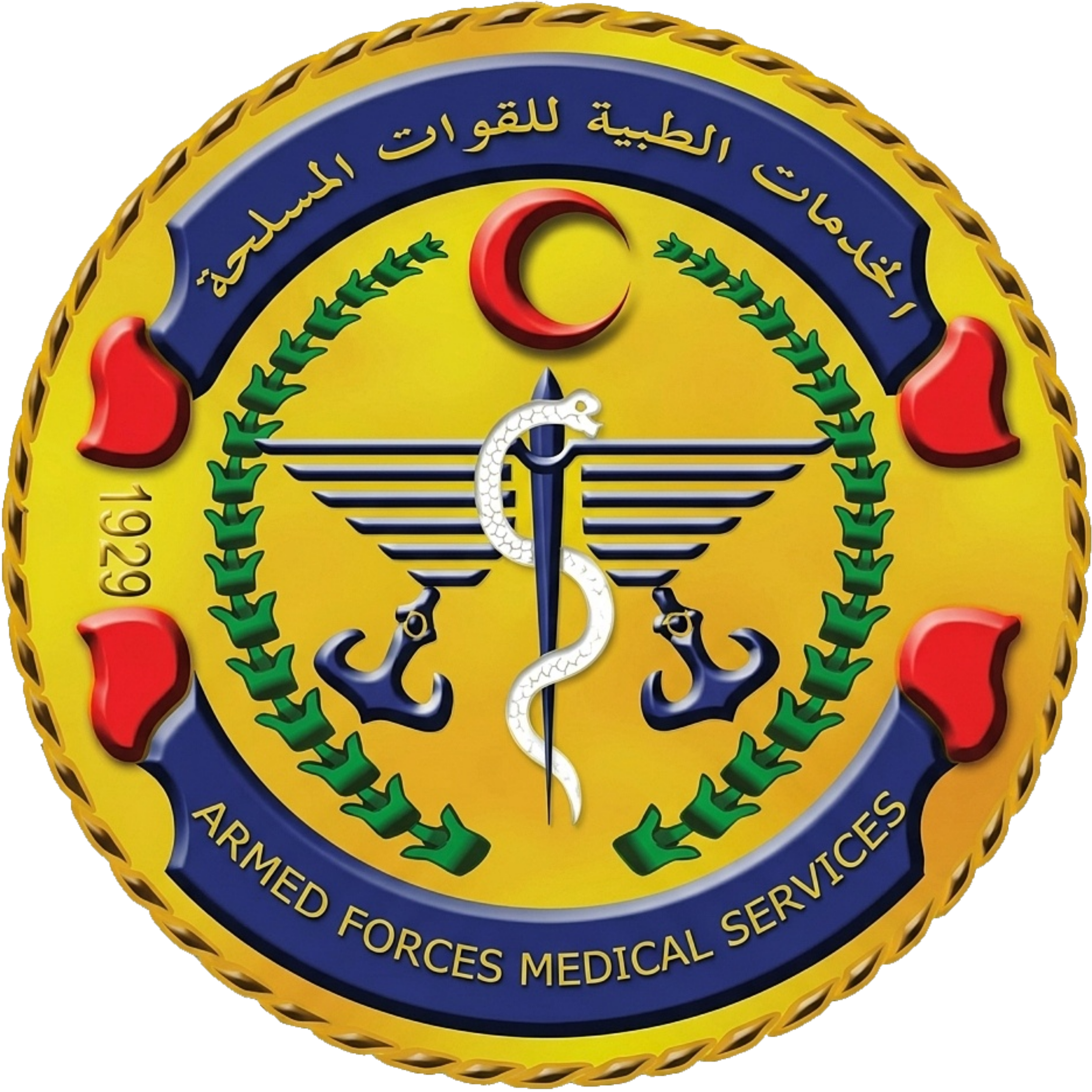
- Country: Egypt
- Branch: Egyptian Army
- Role: Military medicine
- Part of: Egyptian Armed Forces

Commanders
- Current commander: Major General Hisham El-Sheshtawy

The Medical Services Department of the Armed Forces and the Egyptian Army Medical Corps are the departments responsible for the hospitals and medical facilities of the Egyptian Armed Forces including the Army medical schools.

== History ==
The need for Army medical services became apparent to Muhammad Ali during a campaign due to mass attrition. The French doctor, Antoine Clot, became the Chief Doctor of the Army. Clot persuaded Ali to established the first Army School of Medicine in Abu Zaabal in 1827. The first of its kind in the region, it was later expanded with Pharmacy and Midwifery schools.

In the war in Afghanistan, the Medical Corps opened the Egyptian Field Hospital at Bagram in Afghanistan to treat civilians.

Large number of military hospitals are active across Egypt. Many of these centers accept civilian patients. Cairo's Bridge Military Hospital (opened 2011; new additions planned through 2019), is part of an ongoing effort by the Egyptian Army to offer cutting-edge treatment and patient care. The facility has 840 beds spread between major surgery, respiratory disease, and emergency units. Smaller specialized centers in dental, cardiac, and ophthalmological care account for an additional 205 beds.

Egypt's Military Medical Academy was founded in 1979 with the purpose of educating and training medical officers in all branches of Egypt's armed forces. The facility is located on Ihsan Abdul Quddus Street in Cairo. It is associated with the Armed Forces Medical College, founded in 1827. This was the Middle East's first modern school of medicine and was a product of Egypt's newly established Military Department of Health during the administration of Muhammad Ali Pasha.

== Spurious claims about HIV/AIDS ==
At a press conference in February 2014 by Egyptian Gen. Ibrahim Abdel-Atti, chief of the medical branch, falsely claimed that the Egyptian Army had "defeated AIDS... with a rate of 100%" as well as hepatitis C. Abdel-Atti claimed to construct a method to extract the disease and break it into amino acids, "so that the virus becomes nutrition for the body instead of disease." Its military proponents said that this treatment process could take anywhere between 20 days and 6 months to cure having no side effects. Egypt intends to delay exporting their new technology to generate medical tourism into the country. The claims were eventually confirmed to be false.

== Structure ==
The Medical Services Department runs about 48 fixed military hospitals, listed below.

The Army's Medical Corps may have 27 Field Medical Battalions (1st to 27th); 107 Field Medical Companies (201st to 308th); and possibly some hospital barges.

=== List of Military Hospitals ===
Source is the Egyptian Ministry of Defence site:

Hospital	Location	Notes
Kobry El Kobba Armed Forces Medical Complex	Heliopolis, Cairo	
Maadi Armed Forces Medical Complex	Maadi, Cairo	
Al-Galaa Armed Forces Medical Complex	Heliopolis, Cairo	
International Medical Center (Egypt)	El Shorouk, Cairo Governorate	
Republican Guard Hospital	Heliopolis, Cairo	
Armed Forces Fever Hospital	Almaza, Cairo	
Agouza Physical and Rehabilitation Center for Rheumatism	Giza	
Mostafa Kamel Hospital for the Armed Forces	Sidi Gaber, Alexandria	
Ghamra Military Hospital	Ghamra, Cairo	
Almaza Military Hospital	Heliopolis, Cairo	
Suez Military Hospital	Suez City	
Fayed Military Hospital	Fayed, Ismailia	
Kafr El-Sheikh Military Hospital	Kafr El-Sheikh	
Qena military hospital	Qena	
Salloum Military Hospital	Salloum, Matruh	
Mansoura Military Hospital	Mansoura, Dakahlia	
Zagazig Military Hospital	(Zagazig, Sharkia)	
Kafr El-Sheikh Military Hospital	Kafr El- Sheikh)	
Sidi Kerir Military Hospital	Sidi Kerir, Alexandria	
Ahmed Galal Military Hospital Cairo	Ismailia Road, Cairo	
Helmia Military Hospital for Bones and Complement	Helmeyet El Zaitoun, Cairo	
Abbasid Air Force Hospital	Cairo	
Ras Al-Teen Military Hospital	Ras El Teen, Alexandria	
Damietta Military Hospital	Damietta	
Air Force Specialized Hospital	New Cairo, Cairo	
Damanhur Military Hospital	Damanhur, the lake	
Al-Hadra Military Hospital	Al-Hadara, Alexandria	
Civilian Workers Hospital, Armed Forces	Old Cairo, Cairo	
Hospital October 6 Military	October 6, Giza	
Al-Galaa Field Hospital	Ismailia	
Shebin Al-Koum Military Hospital	Shebin Al-Koum, Menoufia	
Port Said Military Hospital	Port Said	
Al Qassaseen Military Hospital	Al Qassaseen, Ismailia	
The Naval Military Hospital	Ras El-Teen, Alexandria	
Giza Armed Forces Hospital	Sakiet Makki, Giza	
Military Psychiatry Complex	Highkestep, Cairo- Ismailia Road, Cairo	
Armed Forces Fever Hospital	Almaza, Cairo Suez Road, Cairo	
Abu Qir Marine Hospital	Abu Qir, Alexandria	
Amreya Military Hospital	Amreya, Alexandria	
Tanta Military Hospital	Tanta, Gharbia	
Beni Suef Military Hospital	Beni Suef	
Minya Military Hospital		
Al-Areesh Military Hospital	Al-Areesh, North Sinai	(El Arish)
Hurghada Military Hospital	Hurghada, Red Sea	
Military Hospital in Sohag	Medical City in Sohag, Sohag	
Qena Military hospital	Qena	
Aswan Military Hospital		
Matrouh Military Hospital	Marsa Matrouh	
Al-Barani Military Hospital	Sidi Al-Barani, Matruh	
West Cairo Military Hospital	Dahshur, Giza	
