= 4th Armoured Division (Egypt) =

Egyptian Army combat formation

- الفرقة الرابعة المدرعة
- Active: 1956-present
- Country: Egypt
- Part of: Third Army (Egypt)
- Garrison/HQ: Suez
- Nickname: Knights of Egypt
- Mottos: Faith, Strength, Victory
- Engagements: Tripartite Aggression; North Yemen Civil War; Six Day War; Yom Kippur War; Operation Badr; 1986 Egyptian conscripts riot; Gulf War; 2011 Egyptian revolution; Sinai Insurgency

Commanders
- Current commander: Brigadier General Hatim Mustafa Zahran
- Notable commanders: Mohammed Abdel Aziz Qabil

The 4th Armoured Division is a military formation of the Egyptian Army. Its most notable service was in the Arab wars with the Israelis in the 1956 Suez Crisis, the 1967 Six-Day War, and the 1973 Yom Kippur War.

The 4th Armoured Division was the first armoured division to be established by the Egyptian Army. The division's involvement in the 1956 war began on October 29, 1956, when a reconnaissance regiment, followed by the 1st and 2nd Armoured Groups (brigades) was ordered to cross the Canal, from its location in the Deversoir area, to the eastern side to counter detected Israeli advances. Egypt began receiving T-34s and SU-100s from Czechoslovakia, with Soviet approval, in 1956. By 1967, while the 4th Armoured Division was still partially equipped with the T-34/85, most were in tank regiments supporting infantry formations.

The division saw service in the 1967 and 1973 wars. While seen as a well-regarded formation before the 1973 war it performed poorly after the Israelis crossed the Canal following the Battle of the Chinese Farm and the ensuing encirclement of the Third Field Army.

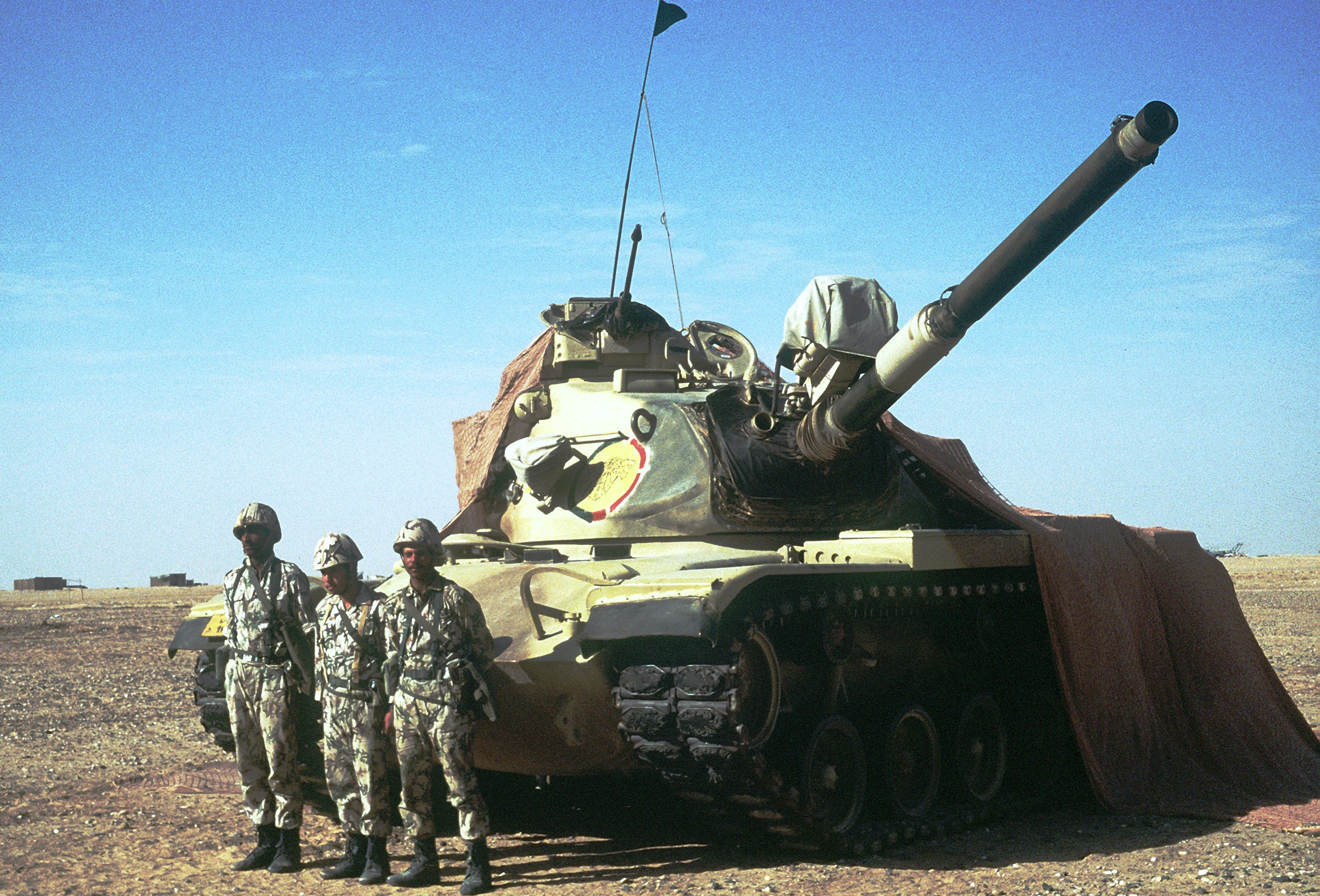
An M60 crew of the division's 3rd Armoured Brigade standing in front of their tank during Operation Desert Shield

The division's U.S. M60A3s tanks were transferred to Egypt in 1987 and another 150 were transferred between 1987 and 1993. They were issued first to the two independent tank brigades and then to the 4th and 9th Armoured Divisions. As with the T-62s, the Egyptians re-equipped their troops a brigade at a time.

The division was part of the corps-sized group dispatched to Saudi Arabia after the Iraqi invasion of Kuwait in September 1990. It participated in the Arab advance of Joint Forces Command North on Kuwait in February 1991.

The division's main weaponry includes M1A1 tanks, M109A5 self-propelled guns, Sakr-45 Rocket Artillery and M113 armored personnel carriers.

In 2018 the structure of the division was reported to include two armoured brigades (the 2nd and 3rd Armoured Brigades were reported by Friedman, "Desert Victory," 1992 during the Gulf War deployment), a mechanized brigade (some reports say this is the 54th Mechanized Brigade), and the 188th Medium Range Artillery Brigade. Other likely units include air defence units, anti-tank unit(s), and support battalions (Signal, Recon, Military Police, Engineers, Medical, Chemical warfare, Supply and Transport)

The number of troops of the division is over 12,500.
