= Third Army (Egypt) =

Formation of the Egyptian Army

Third Field Army
- الجيش الثالث الميداني
- Active: November 1968 – present
- Country: Egypt
- Type: Field Army
- Role: Defense of Suez and South Sinai
- Size: 90,000 - 120,000
- Part of: Unified Command of the Area East of the Canal
- Headquarters: Suez
- Colors Identification: Red, White and Black
- Engagements: War of Attrition; Yom Kippur War; Operation Badr; Sinai Insurgency

Commanders
- Field Army Commander: Major General Khaled Qenawi
- Notable commanders: Kadri Osman; Ahmed Badawi; Abdul Munim Wassel; Osama Askar

The Third Field Army is a field army of the Egyptian Army, with its headquarters in Suez. It is now part of the Unified Command of the area east of the canal (Egypt).

On 31 January 2015 a "unified command" was established to oversee counterterrorism operations east of the Suez Canal. Osama Askar, commander of the Third Army, was promoted to lieutenant general and given command of the new "unified command." Askar will also retain his seat on the SCAF. Askar's former deputy, Muhammad Abdullah, has been appointed commander, and Tarek Anwar Helal the chief of staff, of the Third Army.

== Structure ==
In May 2018 the Third Army comprised:

- 4th Armoured Division,
  - 2nd Armoured Brigade;
  - 3rd Armoured Brigade;
  - 54th Mechanized Brigade;
  - 188th Medium Range Artillery Brigade
- 19th Infantry Division, which included an armoured brigade, but whose remaining troops might have been un-mechanized infantry;
- 23rd Mechanized Division, army commander Osama Askar had previously commanded the 23rd Mechanized Division earlier in his career. It was previously part of the Second Field Army during the Yom Kippur War.
- 11th Armoured Brigade.

== October War 1973 ==
=== Operation Badr order of battle ===
Just before the beginning of Operation Badr in October 1973, the army had the following troops under its control:

- Headquarters Third Army (Southern Canal Zone) - Maj Gen Abdul Munim Wassel

Chief of Staff - Maj Gen Mustafa Shaheen
Chief of Artillery - Maj Gen Munir Shash

  - 7th Infantry Division* - Brig Gen Ahmad Badawi Said Ahmad
    - 2nd Infantry Brigade
    - 11th Mechanized Infantry Brigade
    - 8th Mechanized Infantry Brigade
  - 19th Infantry Division* - Brig Gen Yusuf Afifi Mohamed
    - 5th Infantry Brigade
    - 7th Infantry Brigade
    - 2nd Mechanized Infantry Brigade
  - 4th Armoured Division - Brig Gen Mohamed Abd el Aziz Qabil
    - 2nd Armored Brigade
    - 3rd Armored Brigade*
    - 6th Armored Brigade
  - 6th Mechanised Division - Brig Gen Mohamed Abul Fath Muharam
    - 22nd Armored Brigade*
    - 113th Mechanised Brigade
    - 1st Mechanised Brigade
  - 130th Independent Amphibious Brigade - Col Mahmoud Shu'aib. At the start of the war the brigade had seventy-four BTR-50 or OT-64 SKOT armoured personnel carriers and 24 PT-76 amphibious light tanks.
  - 25th Independent Armored Brigade* - Col Ahmed Helmy Badawy

=== Trapping Third Army ===
During the war the Third Army became trapped on the West Bank of the canal.

Henry Kissinger considered that the situation presented the United States with a tremendous opportunity and that Egypt was dependent on the United States to prevent Israel from destroying its trapped army. The position could be parlayed later into allowing the United States to mediate in the dispute and wean Egypt from Soviet influence. As a result, the United States exerted tremendous pressure on the Israelis to refrain from destroying the trapped army, even threatening to support a UN resolution demanding that the Israelis withdraw to their 22 October positions if they did not allow non-military supplies to reach the army. In a phone call with Israeli ambassador Simcha Dinitz, Kissinger told the ambassador that the destruction of the Egyptian Third Army "is an option that does not exist."

The Israeli government also had its own motivations for not destroying the Third Army. These included the possibility of using the encircled Third Army as a bargaining chip for ending the Egyptian blockade of the Bab-el-Mandel Straits in the Red Sea and negotiating a repatriation of Israeli prisoners-of-war captured by Egypt. The exhausted state of the IDF, the possibility that humiliating Egypt by destroying the Third Army would make Sadat more bellicose and unwilling to cease hostilities, and Israel's intense fears that the Soviet Union would militarily intervene in the event the Third Army was destroyed were additional reasons for Israel ultimately deciding against destroying it.

Despite being surrounded, the Third Army managed to maintain its combat integrity east of the canal and keep up its defensive positions, to the surprise of many. According to Trevor N. Dupuy, the Israelis, Soviets and Americans overestimated the vulnerability of the Third Army at the time. It was not on the verge of collapse, and he wrote that while a renewed Israeli offensive would probably overcome it, this was not a certainty.

David T. Buckwalter agrees that despite the isolation of the Third Army, it was unclear if the Israelis could have protected their forces on the west bank of the canal from a determined Egyptian assault and still maintain sufficient strength along the rest of the front. This assessment was challenged by Patrick Seale, who stated that the Third Army was "on the brink of collapse". Seale's position was supported by P.R. Kumaraswamy, who wrote that intense American pressure prevented the Israelis from annihilating the stranded Third Army.

Herzog noted that given the Third Army's desperate situation, in terms of being cut off from re-supply and reassertion of Israeli air superiority, the destruction of the Third Army was inevitable and could have been achieved within a very brief period. Shazly himself described the Third Army's plight as "desperate" and classified its encirclement as a "catastrophe that was too big to hide". He further noted that, "the fate of the Egyptian Third Army was in the hands of Israel. Once the Third Army was encircled by Israeli troops every bit of bread to be sent to our men was paid for by meeting Israeli demands."

Shortly before the ceasefire came into effect, an Israeli tank battalion advanced into Adabiya, and took it with support from the Israeli Navy. Some 1,500 Egyptian prisoners were taken, and about a hundred Egyptian soldiers assembled just south of Adabiya, where they held out against the Israelis. The Israelis also conducted their third and final incursion into Suez. They made some gains, but failed to break into the city center. As a result, the city was partitioned down the main street, with the Egyptians holding the city center and the Israelis controlling the outskirts, port installations and oil refinery, effectively surrounding the Egyptian defenders.

As a brigadier general, Ahmed Badawi commanded the 7th Infantry Division during the Yom Kippur War, and after the Third Field Army became encircled, was placed in command of the cut-off force. The isolated part of the army was made up of the 7th and 19th Infantry Divisions, plus two independent armoured brigades, on the east bank, and a mixture of units in Suez city itself.

Badawi was still in command of the army in 1976, three years later.

== References and external links ==
- Dani Asher (2009). The Egyptian Strategy for the Yom Kippur War: An Analysis. p. 11.
- https://search.wikileaks.org/plusd/cables/1976CAIRO16857_b.html - Third Army commander Maj Gen Ahmad Badawi speaks to State Department officials, 7 December 1976.
