= Egyptian Army =

Land warfare branch of Egypt's military

- الجيش المصري (Arabic)
- Flag of the Egyptian Army
- Founded: 1820 (current form)
- Country: Egypt
- Type: Army
- Role: Ground warfare
- Size: 310,000 active personnel 375,000 reserve personnel 685,000 total personnel
- Part of: Egyptian Armed Forces
- Armed Forces Chief of Staff's Office: Heliopolis, Cairo
- Motto: Victory or Martyrdom
- Colours: Red, White, Black
- March: "We painted the face of our nation on our hearts." (Arabic: رسمنا على القلب وجه الوطن, rasamna ala al qalb wagh al watan)
- Mascot: Eagle of Saladin
- Engagements: List of wars involving Egypt See list: Alexandria expedition of 1807 Wahhabi War Conquest of Sudan Greek War of Independence Ethiopian–Egyptian border conflict Syrian Peasant Revolt (1834–1835) First Egyptian-Ottoman War 1838 Druze revolt Second Egyptian-Ottoman War Crimean War Second French Intervention in Mexico Great Cretan Revolt Egyptian invasion of the Eastern Horn of Africa Serbian-Ottoman War (1876–1878) Russo-Ottoman War (1877–1878) Egyptian–Ethiopian War Mahdist War Anglo-Egyptian War World War I World War II 1948 Palestine War Suez Crisis North Yemen Civil War Six-Day War Biafra War War of Attrition Yom Kippur War Egyptian-Libyan War Shaba I Egyptian raid on Larnaca International Airport 1986 Egyptian conscripts riot 1999 East Timorese crisis Gulf War Sinai Insurgency Republican Guard headquarters clashes Rabaa massacre Raid on Kerdasa Egyptian intervention in Libya (2015–2020)
- Decorations: See list: Sinai Liberation Medal Order of the Sinai Star Kuwait Liberation Medal 1956 War Medal Independence Medal Order of the Nile Order of the Republic

Commanders
- Supreme commander: President Abdel Fattah el-Sisi
- Minister of Defense: Lieutenant general Ashraf Salem Zaher
- Chief of Staff: Lieutenant general Ahmed Fathy Khalifa

The Egyptian Army, officially the Egyptian Ground Forces, is the land warfare branch (and largest service branch) of the Egyptian Armed Forces. Until the declaration of the Republic and the abolition of the monarchy on 18 June 1953, it was known as the Royal Egyptian Army.

The modern army was established during the reign of Muhammad Ali of Egypt (1805–1849), widely considered to be the "founder of modern Egypt". Its most significant engagements in the 20th century were in Egypt's five wars with the State of Israel (in 1948, 1956, 1967, 1967–1970, and 1973), one of which, the Suez Crisis of 1956, also saw it do combat with the armies of the United Kingdom and France. The Egyptian army was also engaged heavily in the protracted North Yemen Civil War, and the brief Egyptian–Libyan War in July 1977. Its last major engagement was Operation Desert Storm, the liberation of Kuwait from Iraqi occupation in 1991, in which the Egyptian army constituted the second-largest contingent of the allied forces.

The Egyptian Ground Forces are under the direct command of the Chief of Staff of the Armed Forces. As of 2023, the army has an estimated strength of 310,000 of which approximately 90,000–120,000 are professionals and the rest conscripts. There exists an additional 375,000 reservists.

== History ==
For most of its long history, ancient Egypt was unified under one government. There were three kingdoms and two intermediate periods. During the three kingdoms, Egypt was unified under one government. During the intermediate periods between the kingdoms, government control was in the hands of the various nomes (provinces within Egypt) and various foreigners. This circumstance set the stage for many of Egypt's military conquests. They weakened their enemies by using small projectile weapons, like bows and arrows. They also had chariots which they used to charge at the enemy.

The arid plains and deserts surrounding Egypt were inhabited by nomadic tribes who occasionally tried to raid or settle in the fertile Nile River valley. Nevertheless, the great expanses of the desert formed a barrier that protected the river valley and was almost impossible for massive armies to cross. The Egyptians built fortresses and outposts along the borders east and west of the Nile Delta, in the Eastern Desert, and in Nubia to the south. Small garrisons could prevent minor incursions, but if a large force was detected a message was sent for the main army corps. Most Egyptian cities lacked city walls and other defenses.

=== Under the Muhammad Ali Dynasty ===
Following his seizure of power in Egypt, and declaration of himself as khedive of the country, Muhammad Ali Pasha set about establishing a bona fide Egyptian military. Prior to his rule, Egypt had been governed by the Ottoman Empire, and while he still technically owed fealty to the Ottoman Porte, Muhammad Ali sought to gain full independence for Egypt. To further this aim, he brought in European weapons and expertise, and built an army that defeated the Ottoman Sultan, wresting control from the Porte of the Levant, and Hejaz. The Egyptian Army was involved in the following wars during Muhammad Ali's reign:

- Ottoman-Saudi War
- Egyptian conquest of Sudan (1820-1824)
- Greek War of Independence
- Egyptian–Ottoman War (1831–1833)
- Ethiopian–Egyptian border conflict
- Syrian Peasant Revolt (1834–1835)
- Egyptian–Ottoman War (1839–1841)

and during the reign of khedives Abbas I, Sa'id Pasha, Isma'il Pasha and Tewfik Pasha:

- Crimean War
- Second Franco-Mexican War
- Cretan Revolt (1866–1869)
- Egyptian–Ethiopian War
- Serbian–Ottoman Wars (1876–1878)
- Russo-Turkish War (1877–1878)
- Mahdist War
- Anglo-Egyptian War

as well as several expeditions in Sudan during the 1850s, 60s and 70s, and rebellions (mainly in Upper Egyptian Provinces in the 1860s and 1870s, most notably The Axes' Rebellion that occurred from 1864 to 1865 and was started by tens of thousands of Upper Egyptian separatist fellahin led by Sheikh Ahmad Al Tayyib which started with a minimal victory for them in the beginning, successfully seizing all of Upper Egypt under their control. Later in war, the Egyptian government forces managed to defeat the rebels in a series of battles and recaptured all of Upper Egypt.

In 1882 Valentine Baker ("Baker Pasha") was offered the command of the newly formed Egyptian Army, which he accepted. On his arrival at Cairo, however, the offer was withdrawn and he only obtained command of the Egyptian police. In this post he devoted by far the greater amount of his energy to the training of the gendarmerie, which he realised would be the reserve of the purely military forces. Egypt was then involved in the long-running 1881–1899 Mahdist War in the Sudan.

==== Making of a professional army ====
During Muhammad Ali Pasha's reign, the Egyptian army became a much more strictly regimented and professional army. The recruits were separated from daily civilian life and a sense of impersonal law was imposed. Muhammad Ali Pasha previously attempted to create an army of Sudanese slaves and Mamluks, but most died under the intense military training and practices of the Pasha. Instead, the Pasha enforced conscription in 1822 and the new military recruits were mostly Egyptian farmers, also known as fellah. Because of harsh military practices, the 130,000 soldiers conscripted in 1822 revolted in the south in 1824.

The Pasha's goal was to create military order through indoctrination by two new major key practices: isolation and surveillance. In previous times, the wives and family were allowed to follow the army wherever they camped. This was no longer the case. The Pasha sought to create a whole new life for the soldier distinct from that of civilian life. In order to be completely indoctrinated and adapted to the military, they needed to be stripped of their daily lives, habits, and practices. Inside these barracks, soldiers were also subjected to new practices. The rules and regulations were not made to inflict punishment on the recruits but rather to impose a sense of respect for the law; the threat of punishment was enough to keep them in line and from deserting. The roll-call was taken twice a day and those found missing would be declared deserters and would have to face the punishment for their actions. Troops were kept busy to prevent the men from being left idle in the camps. The trivial tasks that filled the soldiers live was an attempt to keep the men constantly engaged in useful tasks and not thinking about leaving. There were also many other reasons why the Pasha enforced this strict isolation. Previously, soldiers would ransack towns and cause mayhem wherever they went. Military disobedience was so frequent that the Bedouins were employed to keep the soldiers in check. This backfired when the Bedouins also indulged in the same destructive behavior. Thus, with the new isolation practices, there was more peace in civilian life.

Isolation also allowed for more intense surveillance. The idea was to promote order through initial obedience rather than through punishment. Though this idea seems humane in nature, the change in mindset went from trust to mistrust and the consequences of disobedience were often fatal. Complete subservience was the Pasha's ultimate goal. An example of this extreme surveillance was the Tezkere. The Tezkere was a certificate with a military official's stamp of approval that allowed the soldier to leave the camp premises. The certificate specified the soldier's reason for and specific details of his absence. The soldier would be invoked to show his certificate when he traveled to prove the legitimacy of his excursion. Even outside the camp surveillance, the soldier is still closely watched.

The Pasha himself also served as a form of surveillance. The law and its strict implementation thereof gave the impression of the Pasha's constant presence. The Pasha highly regarded law and fabricated in his society a strong link between crime and punishment. If a soldier committed crime, its discovery was assumed to be definite along with the punishment thereof. For example, a deserter would receive 15 days imprisonment and 200 lashes for his crime. The harsh punishment, coupled with the fact that roll was called three times daily, dispelled any thought of desertion on the part of the soldier. The previous conception of punishment changed from vengeance to certainty. By far the biggest military reform in this period was crafting the military mindset into one of absolute obedience to prevent any want of dissent. As the soldiers left their old lives for their new military life, they learned their new place in society through their own unique law code and practice.

The transition from corporal punishment as the official policy for punishment to imprisonment is important to the modernization of Egypt's army. The reasoning was that the law can always be applied and a soldier can always be punished for his crimes and that is a better deterrent for crimes than public physical punishments are. However, corporal punishment was not entirely removed. Oftentimes, corporal punishment, such as whipping, will be used along with imprisonment. Prison sentences were divided into three types: light house arrest, heavy house arrest, and imprisonment in the camp jail. Light house arrest had the soldier in isolation for up to two months. Heavy house arrest is limited to one month and has a guard watching over the prisoner and the last option is imprisonment in the camp jail for up to fifteen days.

Policies was also enacted to modernize the army in the way they are structured outside the battlefield. Soldiers were given identification numbers to use on paperwork. A wider variety of uniforms were used to differentiate between ranks. Even buildings has regulations placed on them. Tents were to be placed a set distance between each other and every building had an assigned location within the camp. All of these policies were designed to instill discipline and a sense of collective regularity in every soldier.

Passing laws with a strict punishment regime was not sufficient for the soldiers to internalize the different army regulations that they were asked to obey. For this to succeed these soldiers had to be interned and isolated from outside influences. They then had to be taught to follow rules and regulations that came with army life. This process helped to transform the fellah into disciplined soldiers.

=== The World Wars ===
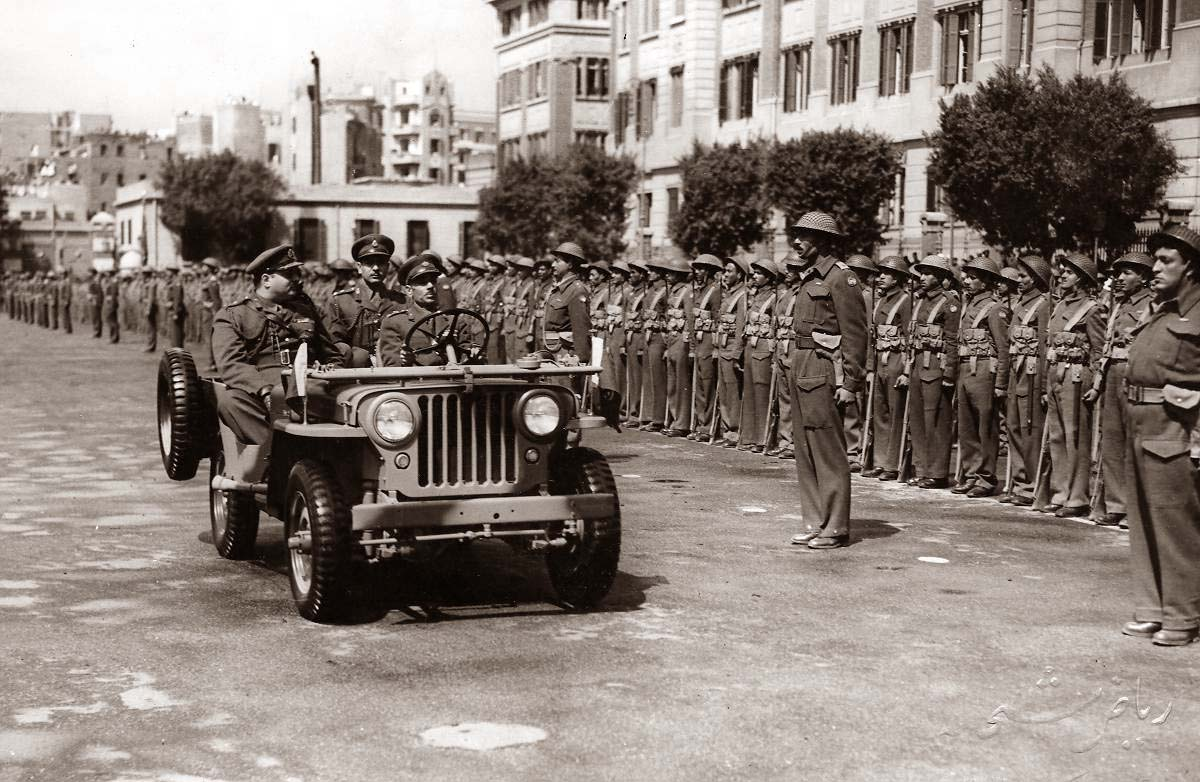
King Farouk I of Egypt inspecting army units in Abdeen Square

In 1882, with the Anglo-Egyptian War, the independence of Egypt ended when it came under British occupation. Though it maintained a level of autonomy, it was essentially a British protectorate. Under British control it participated in World War I against the Ottoman Empire.

From 1882 to 1937 the Egyptian Army was commanded by a British officer, the Sirdar, who from 1898 to 1924 also held the office of governor-general of Sudan.

==== World War I ====
In 1914 the Egyptian Army was a largely native home-defence force. It comprised 17 battalions of infantry (8 Sudanese and 9 Egyptian), 3 companies of mounted infantry, a Camel Corps, support services and various local militia groups. It was organised, expanded and equipped by the British during the prewar years, and led by British officers. Although a few field artillery units participated voluntarily in the defence of the Suez Canal in early 1915, the Egyptian Army was primarily employed to maintain order in the troubled Sudan.

Because of the strategic importance of the Suez Canal, the Ottomans attempted multiple raids and campaigns against the Sinai, in hopes to cut off British shipping and take British Egypt. Ultimately, the Ottomans were repulsed and the British advanced into Palestine.

By 1917, 15,000 Egyptian volunteers were serving in the Egyptian Army, deployed mainly in the Sudan with three battalions in the Egyptian Expeditionary Force, along with 98,000 labourers, 23,000 of whom were serving overseas. The number of Egyptian enlistments could not be increased as conscription could threaten the production of much needed food and cotton and the stability of Egypt. Also by this time, much of the railway lines in Egypt that were not crucial to the production of cotton, sugar, cereals and forages, had already been lifted and used on the military railway, except the Khedivial Railway from Alexandria to Dabaa which was available for emergencies. The Egyptian Labour Corps and the Egyptian Camel Transport Corps performed invaluable service during the Sinai campaign and would perform even greater service and hardships during the coming Palestine campaign.

Up to a million Egyptian labourers participated in the First World War; a high proportion may have perished.

==== World War II ====
Royal Egyptian Army flag

Before the Second World War, "military service was compulsory for men between the ages of nineteen and twenty-seven, but because of the limited size of the army—about 23,000 in 1939—few were actually conscripted. During World War II, Egypt's army grew to about 100,000 troops. Britain maintained a strong influence […] and provided it with equipment, instruction, and technicians. Under the terms of the Anglo-Egyptian treaty of 1936, British troops remained in the country to defend the Suez Canal."

In 1940 the Egyptian Army included three infantry brigades, a small mobile force built around a light car regiment, and eight artillery groupings of various sizes.

Upon Italian entry into World War II, the Italian Tenth Army launched the Italian invasion of Egypt from Cyrenaica in September 1940. Egypt severed relations with the Axis powers after the Italians invaded, but remained technically neutral up until near the end of the war. Italy sought to control the Suez Canal but halted their advance at Sidi Barrani, waiting for engineers to build a road, and further supplies. A British counter-offensive, Operation Compass, began in December 1940 with the invasion of Libya. After significant gains, they were repulsed by German reinforcements under German General Erwin Rommel, who reinvaded Egypt and again were pushed out after the Second Battle of El-Alamein.

U.S. diplomats wrote in 1952 that a split had been developing since 1929-30 between college educated younger officers, who had been dispatched to take staff course in the United Kingdom, and the "older ill-educated top-ranking officers [who] were apparently keeping them from promotion. During the Palestine War the extent of the graft and corruption among these older officers became apparent to an alarming degree, and during 1950 the younger officers succeeded in forcing a thorough investigation of the Arms Scandal, resulting in the retirement of the majority of the top-ranking generals, including Haidar Pasha, the Commander-in-Chief, Osman Mahdi Pasha, the Chief of Staff, and Sirry Amer Pasha, Commander of the elite Frontier Corps. However, not long ago after the retirement of these officers, they were quietly reappointed to their old positions by the King, and the junior officers again found themselves the victims of graft, corruption and favoritism by the Palace clique."

By 1950, King Farouk was recruiting former German Wehrmacht army officers to advise the army, replacing the British Military Mission, which had left Egypt in 1947. Generals Wilhelm Fahrmbacher and Oskar Munzel led the advisors, who stayed until 1958. Fahrmbacher and six aides arrived in Egypt in 1950 as the initial party of a group of about 30 officers.

=== After the Egyptian Revolution of 1952 ===
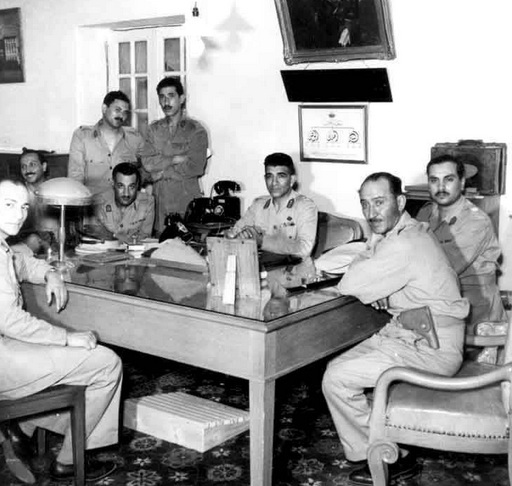
Members of the Free Officers gathered after the revolution. From left to right: Zakaria Mohieddin, Abdel Latif Boghdadi, Kamel el-Din Hussein, Gamal Abdel Nasser (seated), Abdel Hakim Amer, Muhammad Naguib, Youssef Seddik and Ahmed Shawki

After the defeat of the Egyptian army in the 1948 Arab–Israeli War, dissatisfied Egyptian officers created a secret organisation, the Free Officers. Led by Muhammad Naguib and Gamal Abdel Nasser, the Free Officers overthrew King Farouk in the Egyptian coup d'état of 1952. The Free Officers then concluded the Anglo–Egyptian Agreement of 1954, made during the month of October, with Great Britain. It stipulated a phased evacuation of British troops from the Suez base, agreed to withdrawal of all troops within 20 months (that is, June 1956); maintenance of the base was to be continued; and allowed Britain to hold the right to return for seven years.

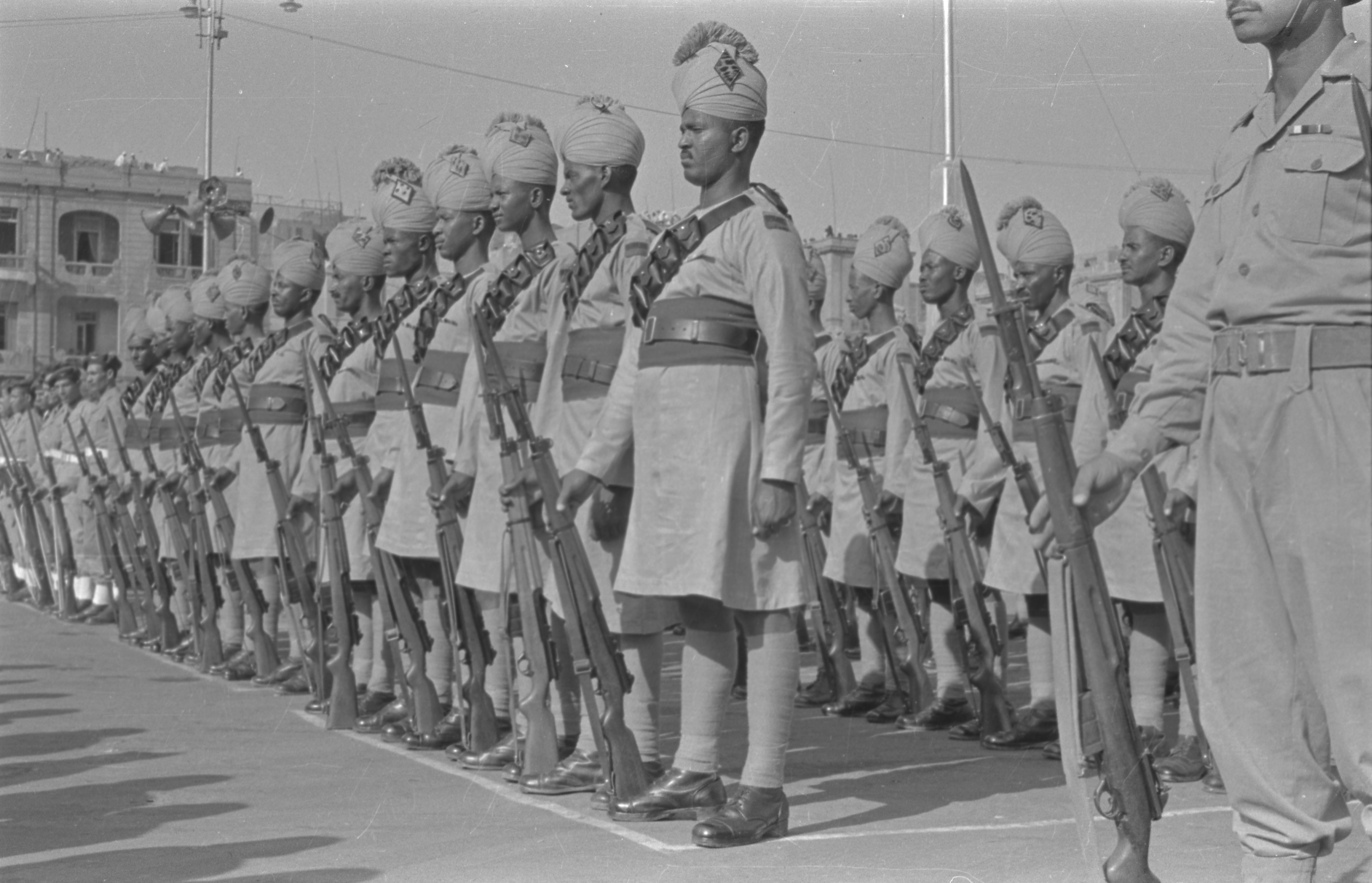
Egyptian soldiers during a military parade in 1955

The last British combat unit left by 24 March 1956. Soon afterwards, the Suez Crisis arose, known in Egypt and the Arab World as the Tripartite Aggression. Just before the Suez Crisis, politics rather than military competence was the main criterion for promotion. The Egyptian commander, Field Marshal Abdel Hakim Amer, was a purely political appointee who owed his position to his close friendship with Nasser. A heavy drinker, he would prove himself grossly incompetent as a general during the Crisis. Rigid lines between officers and men in the Egyptian Army led to a mutual "mistrust and contempt" between officers and the men who served under them. Egyptian troops were excellent in defensive operations, but had little capacity for offensive operations, owing to the lack of "rapport and effective small-unit leadership".

Tsouras writes that the mobilised strength of the army in October 1956 was 100,000, in 18 brigades (of which 10 were infantry, 2 armoured, 1 armoured training, and 1 medium machine-gun). The main manoeuvre formations were concentrated in the Sinai (30,000 in two divisions) or in the Canal Zone (one division). The field formations were preoccupied with changing over from British and American to Soviet military equipment. But after the Israeli attack started, "[t]he Egyptians in the Sinai never had a chance.' The Israelis seized the advantage, severed all the fragile seams in the organisation of the Egyptian forces, and destroyed their defences. Nasser ordered retreat from the Sinai which turned into a rout.

By November 1957, the CIA wrote that the Egyptian ground forces were estimated to have a strength of 70,000 in combat units, and a total strength of 100,000. While there were three infantry divisions & one armoured division headquarters, they only performed administrative duties. The largest Egyptian combat units were the seven infantry brigades and four armoured groups.

Later, the army fought in the North Yemen Civil War from 1962 to 1967, and the 1967 Six-Day War.

==== North Yemen Civil War ====
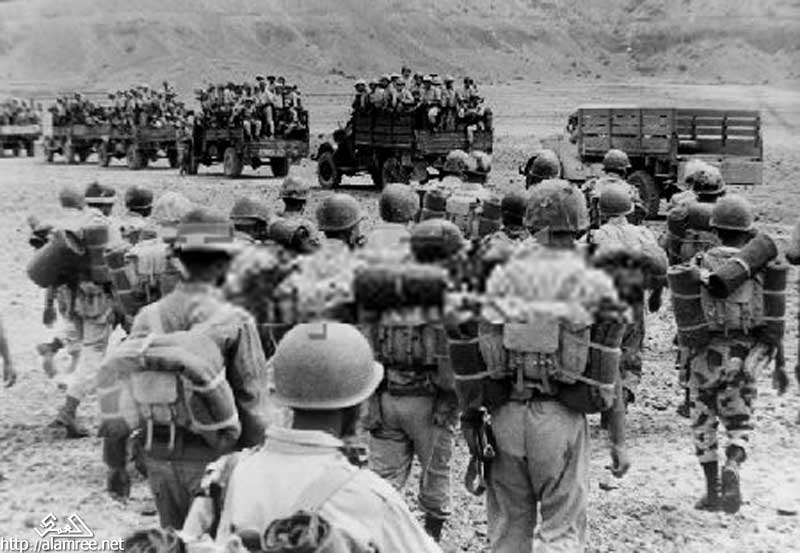
Egyptian army in Sanaa in 1962

Within three months of sending troops to Yemen in 1962, Nasser realized that the engagement would require a larger commitment than anticipated. By early 1963, he would begin a four-year campaign to extricate Egyptian forces from Yemen, using an unsuccessful face-saving mechanism, only to find himself committing more troops. A little less than 5,000 troops were sent in October 1962. Two months later, Egypt had 15,000 regular troops deployed. By late 1963, the number was increased to 36,000; and in late 1964, the number rose to 50,000 Egyptian troops in Yemen. Late 1965 represented the high-water mark of Egyptian troop commitment in Yemen at 55,000 troops, which were broken into 13 infantry regiments of one artillery division, one tank division from the Egyptian Armoured Corps and several Special Forces as well as airborne regiments (Aboul-Enein, p21). All the Egyptian field commanders complained of a total lack of topographical maps causing a real problem in the first months of the war.

==== 1967 War ====
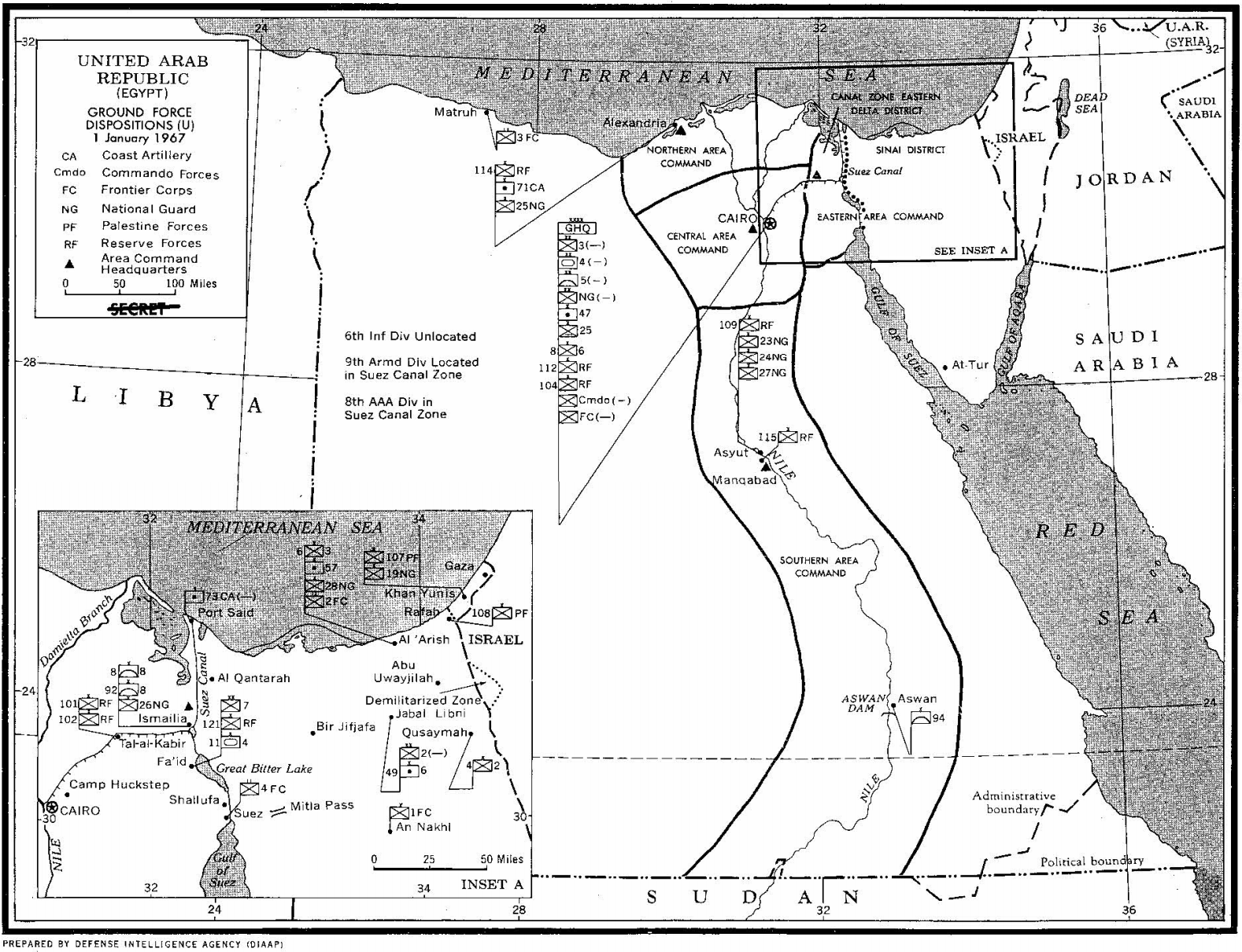
DIA estimate of Egyptian Army dispositions as of 1 January 1967. Comparison with Dupuy 1978 reveals some errors, such as the location of the 6th Mechanised Division, which was in the Sinai.

There was a separate command for the Egyptian Army (created) on 25 March 1964, but it was officially abolished after the Six-Day War of 1967, so that the command of the land formations returned directly to the Chief of Staff of the Armed Forces, and the ground formations were divided to the forces east of the canal, under whose command the two armies (the Second and the Third) and the military regions (central, northern, western, and southern), in contrast to the rest of the forces, bodies, departments, and auxiliary agencies.

Before the June 1967 War, the army divided its personnel into four regional commands (Suez, Sinai, Nile Delta, and Nile Valley up to the Sudan). The remainder of Egypt's territory, over 75%, was the sole responsibility of the Frontier Corps.

In May 1967, Nasser closed the Straits of Tiran to passage of Israeli ships. On 26 May Nasser declared, "The battle will be a general one and our basic objective will be to destroy Israel". Israel considered the closure of the Straits of Tiran a casus belli. The Egyptian army then comprised two armoured and five infantry divisions, all deployed in the Sinai.

In the weeks before the Six-Day War began, Egypt made several significant army organisational changes. Field Marshal Amer created a new command interposed between the general staff and the Eastern Military District commander, Lieutenant General Salah ad-Din Muhsin. This new Sinai Front Command was placed under General Abdel Mohsin Murtagi, who had returned from Yemen in May 1967. Six of the seven divisions in the Sinai (with the exception of the 20th Infantry 'Palestinian' Division) had their commanders and chiefs of staff replaced. What fragmentary information is available suggests to authors such as Pollack that Amer was trying to improve the competence of the force, replacing political appointees with veterans of the Yemen war.

After the war began on 5 June 1967, Israel attacked Egypt and occupied the Sinai Peninsula. The forward Egyptian forces were shattered in three places by the attacking Israelis, including at the Battle of Abu-Ageila (1967), and a retreat to the mountain passes fifty miles east of the canal was ordered. This developed into a rout as the Israelis harried the retreating troops from the ground and from the air.

=== Presidents Sadat and Mubarak ===
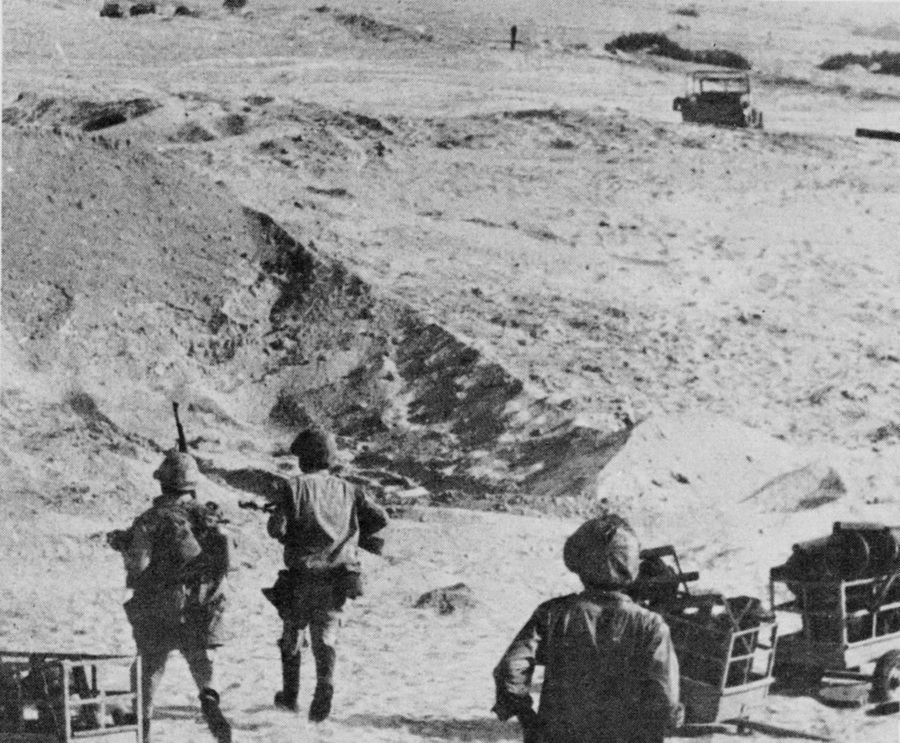
Egyptian soldiers on the east bank. Notice the carts. Pulled by two men, these transports greatly assisted in the movement of weapons and matériel on the east bank, while no vehicles had yet crossed.

After the 1967 disaster, two field armies, the Second Army and the Third Army, both stationed on the Suez, were established.

The armed forces also fought in the 1969–1970 War of Attrition against Israeli positions especially in the Sinai. The October War of 1973 began with a massive and successful Egyptian crossing of the Suez Canal. After crossing the cease-fire lines, Egyptian forces advanced virtually unopposed into the Sinai Peninsula. The Syrians coordinated their attack on the Golan Heights to coincide with the Egyptian offensive and initially made threatening gains into Israeli-held territory. As Egyptian president Anwar Sadat began to worry about Syria's fortunes, he believed that capturing two strategic mountain passes located deeper in the Sinai would make his position stronger during the negotiations. He therefore ordered the Egyptians to go back on the offensive, but the attack was quickly repulsed. The Israelis then counterattacked at the juncture of the Second and Third Armies, crossed the Suez Canal into Egypt, and began slowly advancing southward and westward in over a week of heavy fighting which inflicted heavy casualties on both sides. Between the 18 and 22 October, the IDF fought in the Port City of Ismalia in order to encircle Egypt's second army, but failed to capture the city after heroic resistance.

On 22 October a United Nations-brokered ceasefire quickly unraveled, with each side blaming the other for the breach. By 24 October, the Israelis had improved their positions considerably and completed their encirclement of Egypt's Third Army and the city of Suez. This development led to tensions between the United States and the Soviet Union. As a result, a second ceasefire was imposed cooperatively on 25 October to end the war. At the conclusion of hostilities, Israeli forces were just 42 kilometres (26 mi) from Damascus and 101 kilometres (63 mi) from Cairo. Egypt claimed victory in the October War because its military objective of capturing a foothold of Sinai was achieved.

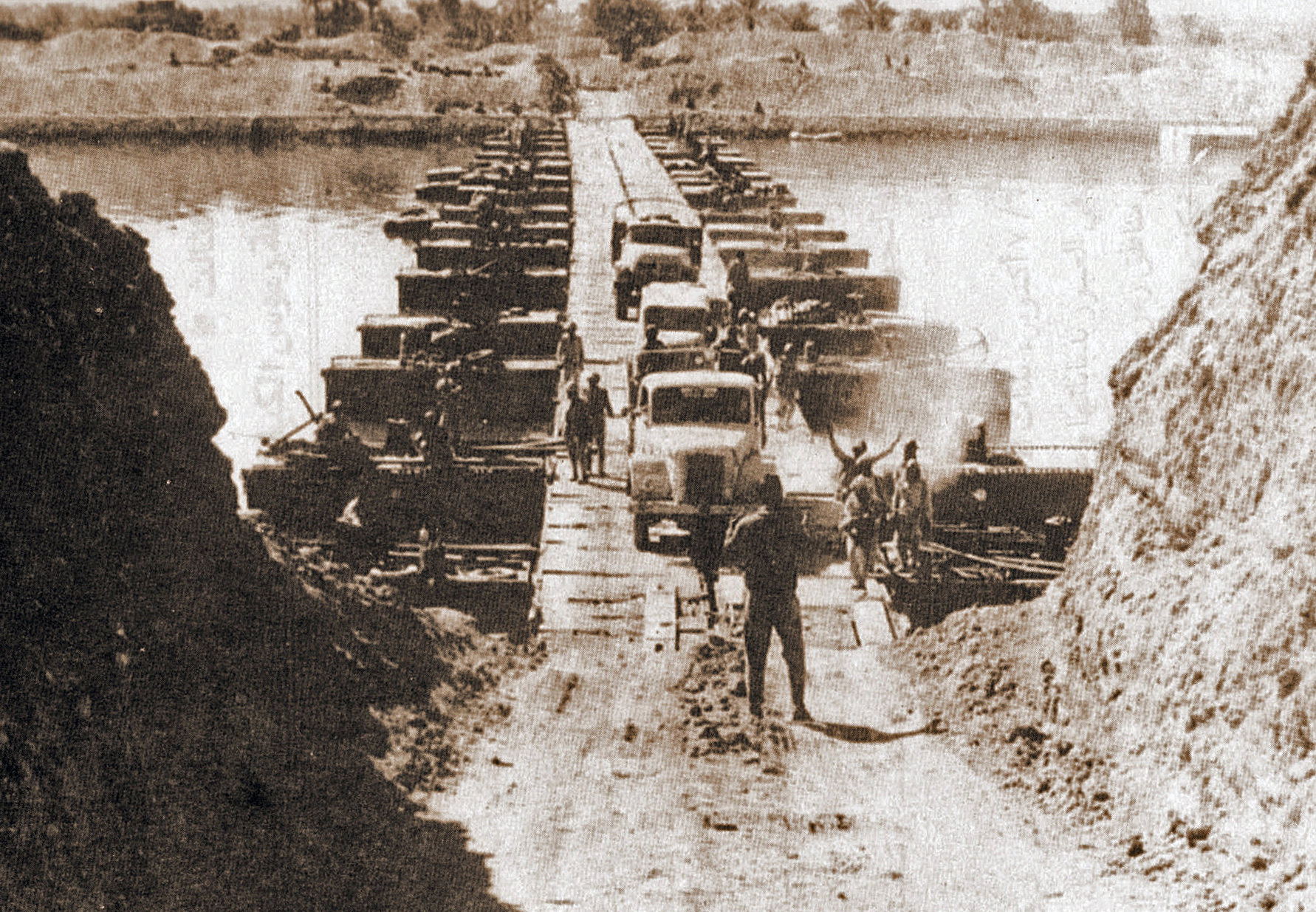
Egyptian forces crossing the Suez Canal on 7 October 1973 during the Yom Kippur War

In 1977 the army fought in the Libyan-Egyptian War. By early July 1977, the two divisions deployed to the Egypt-Libya border had been raised to full strength and were dug in. They were bolstered by several Sa'ka Forces commando battalions and support units, while a third division stationed near Cairo and other commandos were ready to relocate on short notice. A total of over 40,000 troops were deployed to the border during the war.

The army had an estimated strength of 320,000 in 1989. About 180,000 of these were conscripts. Beyond the Second Army and Third Army in the east, most of the remaining troops were stationed in the Nile Delta region, around the upper Nile, and along the Libyan border. These troops were organised into eight military districts, later reduced to five major regions. Commando and airborne units were stationed near Cairo under central control but could be transferred quickly to one of the field armies if needed. District commanders, who generally held the rank of major general, maintained liaison with governors and other civil authorities on matters of domestic security.

Decision making in the army continued to be highly centralized during the 1980s. Officers below brigade level rarely made tactical decisions and required the approval of higher-ranking authorities before they modified any operations. Senior army officers were aware of this situation and began taking steps to encourage initiative at the lower levels of command. A shortage of well-trained enlisted personnel became a serious problem for the army as it adopted increasingly complex weapons systems. Observers estimated in 1986 that 75 percent of all conscripts were illiterate when they entered the military.

=== 1990s and after ===
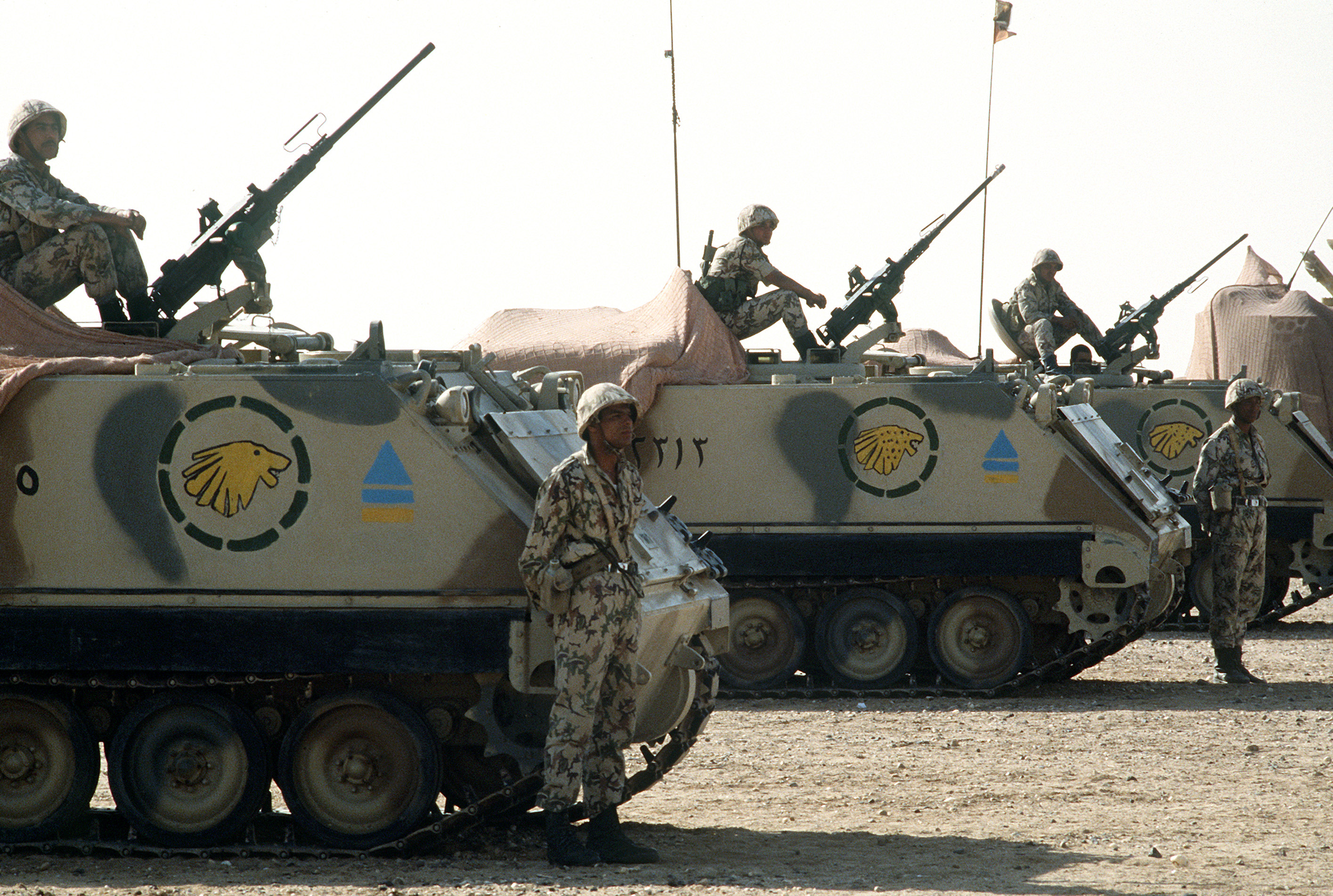
Egyptian soldiers with M113 armored personnel carriers during a demonstration for visiting dignitaries, part of Operation Desert Shield.

Since the 1980s the army has built closer and closer ties with the United States, as evidenced in the bi-annual Operation Bright Star exercises. This cooperation eased integration of the Egyptian Army into the Gulf War coalition of 1990–91, during which the Egyptian II Corps under Major General Salah Halabi, with 3rd Mechanized Division and 4th Armoured Division, fought as part of the Arab Joint Forces Command North. The deployed force performed appallingly. It was unable to move up the first attack time after a request from overall commander U.S. General Norman Schwarzkopf; halted after 'desultory' Iraqi artillery fire; continued to move so slowly that on the morning of the third day of the war, still had not taken their first day's objectives; and could not reorient themselves in order to take up an invitation to join a ceremonial joint Arab entry into Kuwait City until Schwarzkopf was able to get Hosni Mubarak to give a direct order to the Egyptian commander to do so.

The Army conducted Exercise Badr '96 in 1996 in the Sinai. The virtual enemy during the exercise was Israel. The exercises in the Sinai were part of a larger exercise that involved 35,000 men in total. Egypt conducted another Badr exercise, the largest military exercise since 1996 in 2014.

Up until the end of the Cold War, Egyptian military participation in UN peacekeeping operations had been restricted to a battalion with ONUC in the Congo. The Egyptians appear to have arrived by September 1960, but left by early 1961 after a dispute about the UN's role. But after 1991, many more United Nations Military Observers and troops were dispatched, alongside police in some cases. Military observers served in Western Sahara (MINURSO), Angola (UNAVEM II), the United Nations Protection Force (UNPROFOR) in the former Yugoslavia, Somalia, Mozambique, Georgia, Macedonia, Eastern Slavonia, UNMOP (Prevlaka), and Sierra Leone. UN official sources say Egypt participated in UNCRO, but Berman and Sams, citing official Egyptian sources at the Egyptian Delegation to the United Nations, say this is incorrect. Troops were dispatched to UNPROFOR (a battalion of 410 men), UNOSOM II in Somalia, the United Nations Mission in the Central African Republic (MINURCA) (328 troops in June 1999), and MONUC (15 troops in 2004). The Egyptian contribution in the Congo expanded significantly after 2004; in 2013, an Egyptian battalion was part of the mission, with at least a company stationed at the Kavumu airfield in South Kivu.

Today conscripts without a college degree serve three years as enlisted soldiers. Conscripts with a General Secondary School degree serve two years as enlisted soldiers. Conscripts with a college degree serve 14 months as enlisted or 27 months as a reserve officer.

=== Twenty-first century ===
On 31 January 2011, during the Egyptian revolution of 2011, Israeli media reported that the 9th, 2nd, and 7th Divisions of the Army had been ordered into Cairo to help restore order.

On 3 July 2013, the Egyptian Armed Forces launched a coup d'état against the elected government of Mohamed Morsi following mass protests demanding his resignation. On 8 July 2013, clashes between the Republican Guard and pro-Morsi supporters left 61 protestors killed. On 14 August 2013, the Egyptian Army along with the police carried out the Rabaa massacre, killing more than 987 people.

Human Rights Watch wrote:

The gravest incident of mass protester killings occurred on August 14, when security forces crushed the major pro-Morsy sit-in in Rab’a al-Adawiya Square in the Nasr City district of eastern Cairo. Using armored personnel carriers (APCs), bulldozers, ground forces, and snipers, police and army personnel attacked the makeshift protest encampment, where demonstrators, including women and children, had been camped out for over 45 days, and opened fire on the protesters, killing at least 817 and likely more than 1,000. Human Rights Watch researchers documented the dispersal of the Rab’a sit-in and found that security forces opened fire on protesters using live ammunition, with hundreds killed by bullets to their heads, necks, and chests. Human Rights Watch also found that security forces used lethal force indiscriminately, with snipers and gunmen inside and alongside APCs firing their weaponry on large crowds of protesters. Dozens of witnesses also said they saw snipers fire from helicopters over Rab’a Square.

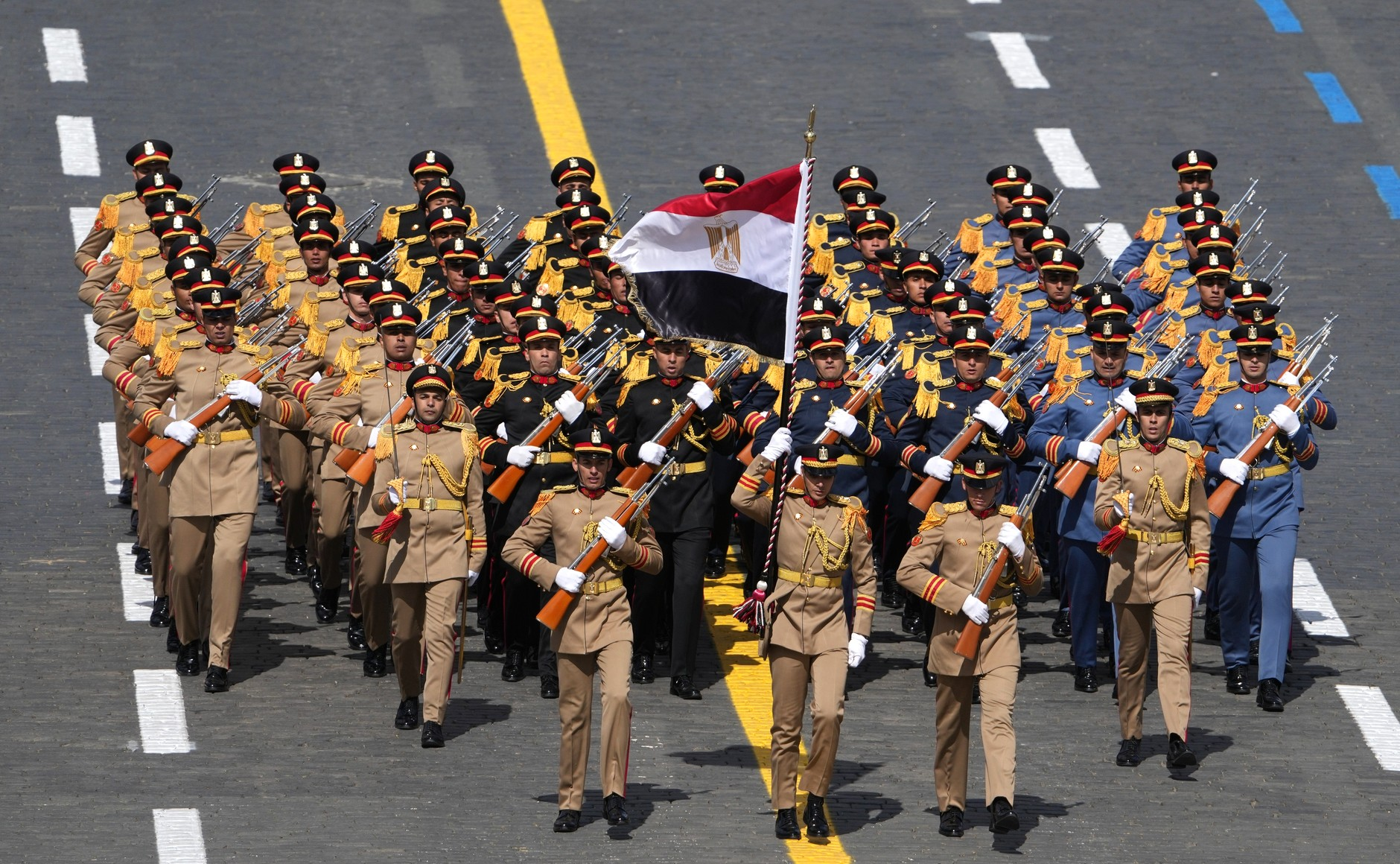
Egyptian Army in the Red Square in Moscow during the Victory Day parade on 9 May 2025

The total casualty count made 14 August the deadliest day in Egypt since the Egyptian revolution of 2011 which had toppled former President Hosni Mubarak.

Several world leaders denounced the violence during the sit-in dispersals.

On 25 March 2020, it was reported that two army generals, Shafea Dawoud and Khaled Shaltout, had died from the COVID-19 pandemic in Egypt, and at least 550 officers and soldiers had been infected with the virus.

In March 2021, Human Rights Watch accused the Egyptian armed forces of violating international human rights law and committing war crimes by demolishing more than 12,300 residential and commercial buildings and 6,000 hectares of farmland since 2013 in North Sinai.

== Structure ==
The Egyptian Military Operations Authority, governed by the Ministry of Defense, is headquartered in Cairo. The Egyptian Armed Forces' Chief of Staff's office is in Cairo. He is the Chief of Staff of the Army, as well as the Navy and Air Forces, although the latter two typically report to the Ministry of Defense.

Oriented towards the Sinai Peninsula and based just west of the Canal are the Second Army and the Third Army.

Central Military Region

HQ Heliopolis, Greater Cairo

  - Field HQ, Heliopolis, Central Military Region
  - Field HQ, El Qanater, Central Military Region
    - Sub-Field HQ, Tanta, Central Military Region
    - Sub-Field HQ, Zagazig, Central Military Region
  - Field HQ, Qom Ushim, Faiyum, Central Military Region
  - Field HQ, Beni Suef, Central Military Region

Northern Military Region

HQ Alexandria

  - Field HQ, Alexandria, Northern Military Region
    - Sub-Field HQ, Abou Qir, Northern Military Region
    - Sub-Field HQ, Mariout, Northern Military Region
  - Field HQ, Rashid, Northern Military Region
  - Field HQ, Damietta, Northern Military Region

Unified Command of the Area East of the Canal

HQ Suez

  - Field HQ, Port Said, Northern Suez Canal Military Region
  - Field HQ, Ismailia, Central Suez Canal Military Region
  - Field HQ, El Mansoura, El Daqahliya, Eastern Delta Military Region
  - Field HQ, El Suez, Southern Suez Canal Military Region
  - Field HQ, Cairo-Suez Highway Military Region
  - Field HQ, Hurghada, Red Sea Military Region

Western Military Region

HQ Mersa Matruh

  - Field HQ, Sidi Barrani, Western Military Region
  - Field HQ, Marsa Matrouh, Western Military Region
  - Field HQ, Sallum, Western Military Region

Southern Military Region

HQ Assiut

  - Field HQ, El Minya, Southern Military Region
  - Field HQ, Qena, Southern Military Region
  - Field HQ, Sohag, Southern Military Region
  - Field HQ, Aswan, Southern Military Region

=== Administrative corps and branches ===
Administratively, army corps and branches include the Egyptian Armored Corps; the Infantry/mechanised forces; the Artillery Corps; the Egyptian Airborne Corps, the Sa'ka Forces – the Egyptian special forces; the Reconnaissance Corps; the Signal Corps and Electronic Warfare forces; the Engineering Corps; the Medical Corps, whose field units' status in the early 2020s is unconfirmed; the Supply Corps, which may be the same organisation as the Quartermaster Corps; the Military Police Corps; the Chemical Warfare Corps; and tactical missile (longer range surface-to-surface missile forces), which may be part of the Artillery Corps.

The Republican Guard's armoured forces are closely associated with the army. In addition, the Border Guard/Frontier Corps is also affiliated with the armed forces.

The Armed Forces Medical Service Department operates over forty hospital facilities across Egypt. Cairo's Kobry Bridge complex of Multiple military hospitals (opened 2011; new additions planned through 2019), is part of an ongoing effort by the Egyptian Army to offer cutting-edge treatment and patient care. The facility has 840 beds spread between major surgery, respiratory disease, and emergency units. Smaller specialized centers in dental, cardiac, and ophthalmological care account for an additional 205 beds.

Egypt's Military Medical Academy was founded in 1979 with the purpose of educating and training medical officers in all branches of Egypt's armed forces. The facility is located on Ihsan Abdul Quddus Street in Cairo. It is associated with the Armed Forces Medical College, founded in 1827. This was the Middle East's first modern school of medicine and was a product of Egypt's newly established Military Department of Health during the administration of Muhammad Ali Pasha.

== Ranks and insignia ==
Commissioned officers

| Rank group | General / flag officers | | | | | Senior officers | | | Junior officers |
|---|---|---|---|---|---|---|---|---|---|---|---|
| Egyptian Army |
| Egyptian Army | مشیر; Mushir | فريق أول; Fariq 'awal | فريق; Fariq | لواء; Liwa | عميد; Amid | عقيد; Aqid | مقدم; Muqaddam | رائد; Ra'id | نقيب; Naqib | ملازم أول; Mulazim awwal | ملازم; Mulazim |

Enlisted

| Rank group | Senior NCOs | | | | Junior NCOs | Enlisted |
|---|---|---|---|---|---|---|
| Egyptian Army |
| Egyptian Army | مساعد أول; Mosa'id awwal | مساعد; Mosa'id | رقيب أول; Raqib awwal | رقيب; Raqib | عريف 'arif | جندي; Jundi |

== Uniform ==
The Egyptian Army utilizes a British style ceremonial outfit, with desert camouflage implemented in 2012. Identification between the different branches of the Egyptian Army depended on the insignia on the upper left shoulder of the uniform, and also the color of the beret. The Airborne, Shock troopers, and Republican Guard units each utilize their own camouflaged uniforms.

=== Camouflage Suit ===
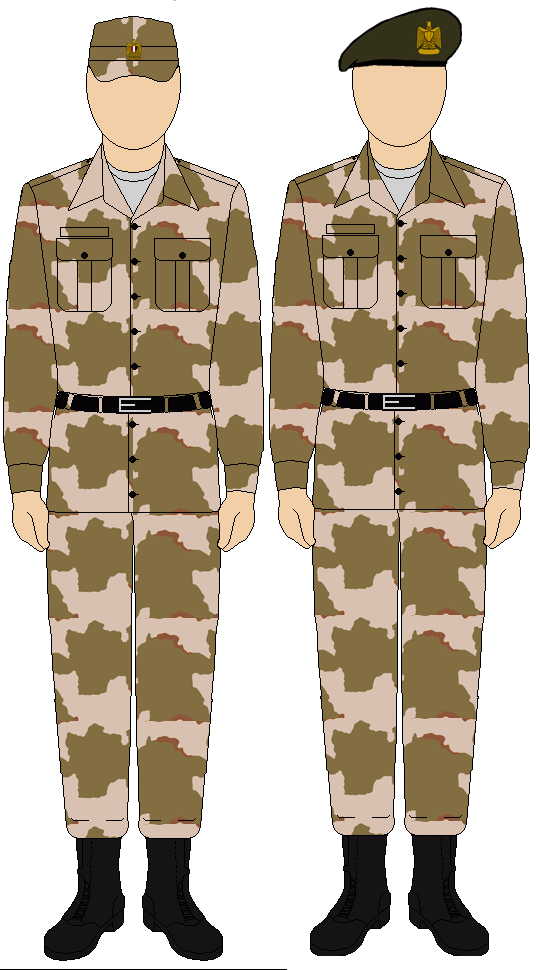
Army

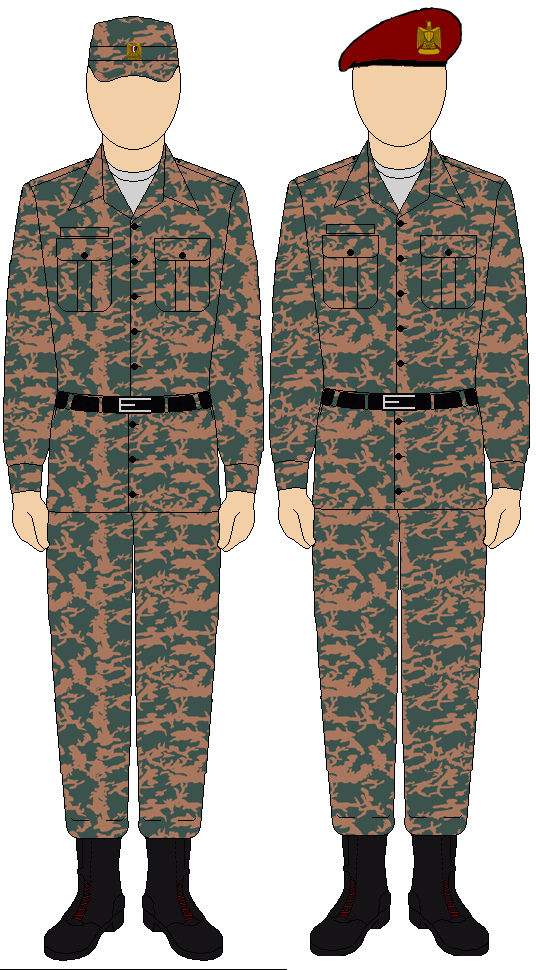
Airborne

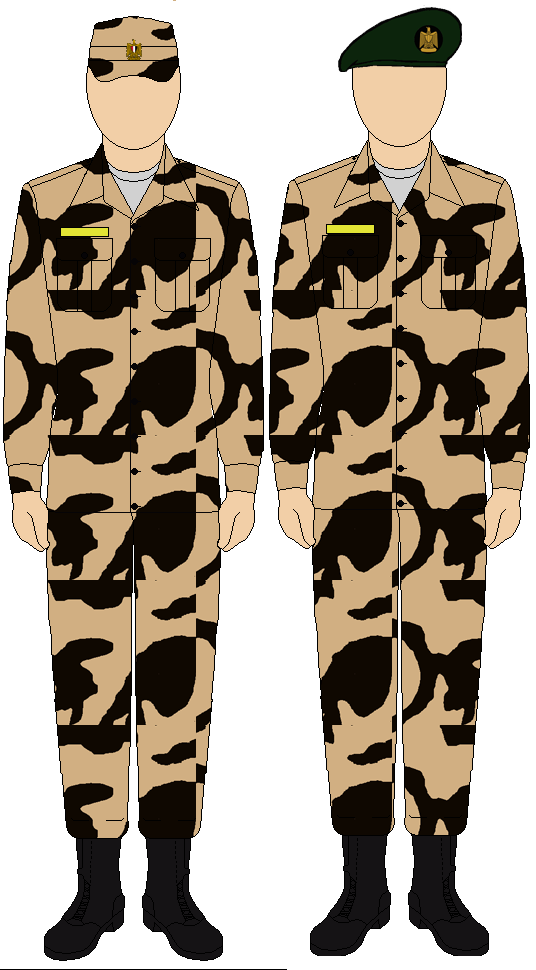
Shock troopers

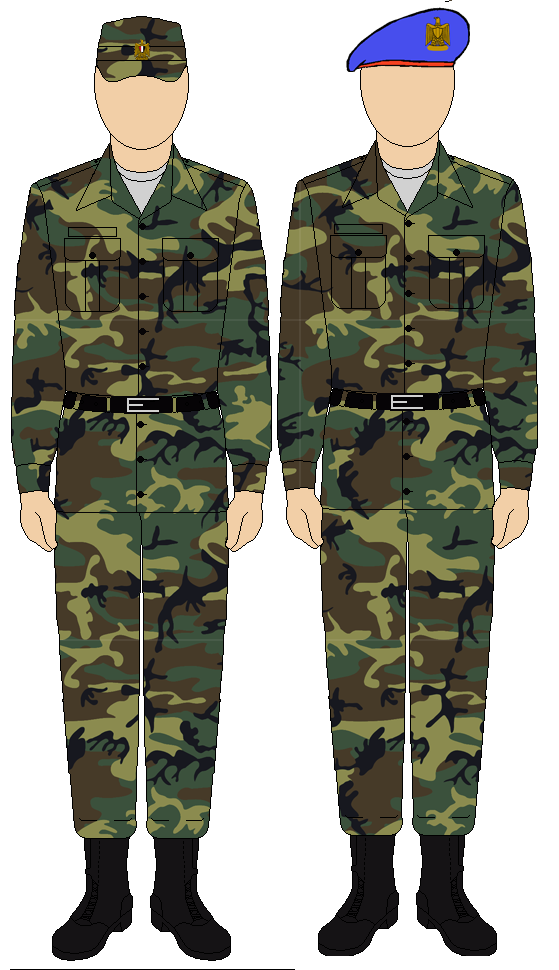
Republican Guard

== Equipment ==
Cyclone military exercise between special forces of Indian Army and Egyptian Army

Egypt's varied army weapons inventory complicates logistical support for the army. National policy since the 1970s has included the creation of a domestic arms industry (including the Arab Organization for Industrialization) capable of indigenous maintenance and upgrades to existing equipment, with the ultimate aim of Egyptian production of major ground systems. By 1985, Egypt had acquired 659 M60 tanks with a new letter of offer also being issued by the United States Department of Defense for an additional 94 M60A3 tanks, on top of the 659 already in service. The U.S. also sold Egypt nearly 500 AGM-114 Hellfire anti-tank guided missiles.

In the second half of 1984, General Dynamics received a $150 million contract to build a "new tank plant," to be called Factory 200, in Abu Zaabal, an industrial suburb north of Cairo. It initially overhauled U.S. M60 tanks and M88 Recovery Vehicle. M1 Abrams production commenced in 1992. It is now called the Armoured Production and Repair Factory.

Today, the Egyptian Army uses a variety of weapon systems and vehicles from United States, Russia, and other national suppliers.

== See also ==
- Egyptian National Military Museum
- Military of the Tulunid Emirate
- Military of the Mamluk Sultanate
- Military Technical College (Egypt)
- Egyptian intervention in the Crimean War
- Central Security Forces
- List of countries by number of active troops
- Egyptian Peacekeeping Forces
