= Egyptian Military College =

Military academy

Coordinates: 30.1096°N 31.3585°E

- الكلية الحربية المصرية
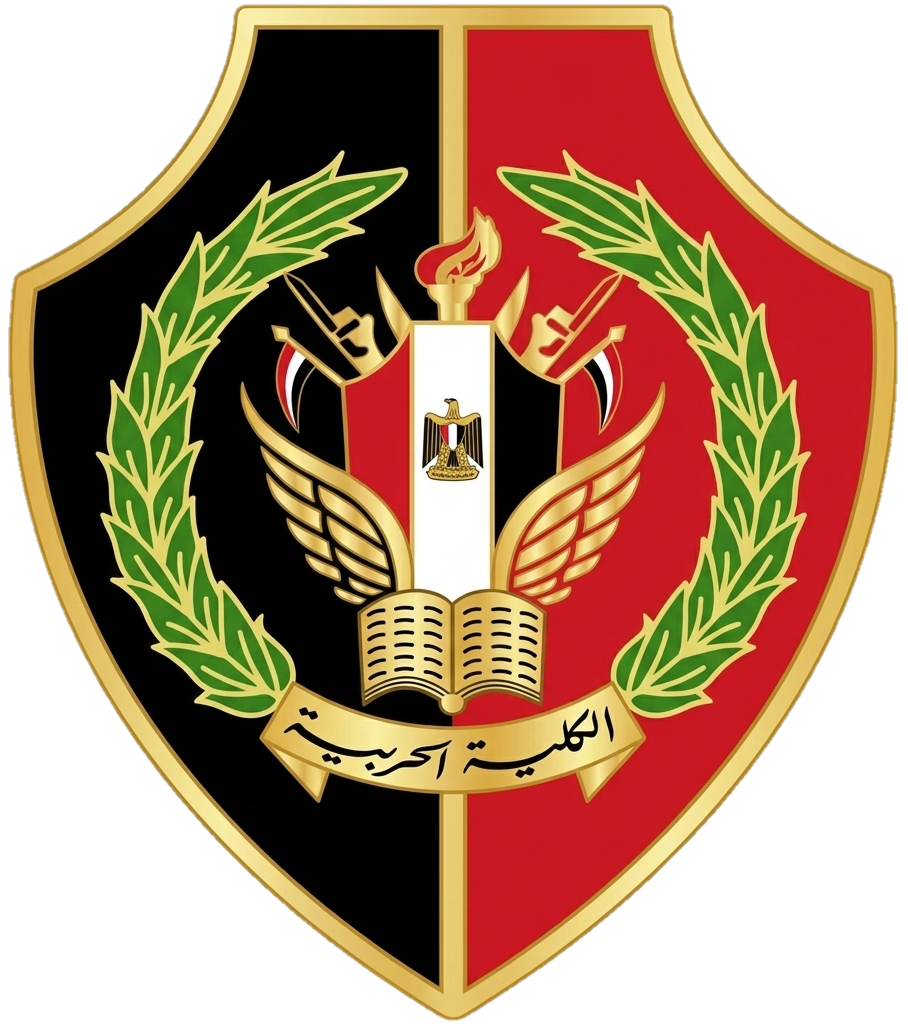
- Former names: Military Camp, until 1938; Royal Military School, until 1954
- Motto: Duty, Honor, Homeland
- Type: Military Academy
- Established: 1811; 215 years ago
- Director: Staff Major General: Ashraf Faris
- Location: Cairo, Egypt
- Campus: Urban Campus
- Colors: Red & Black
- Website: http://academy.mod.gov.eg/MiAc.aspx

The Egyptian Military College (Arabic: الكلية الحربية) is the oldest and most prominent military academy in Egypt. One of the colleges of the Egyptian Military Academy. The college was founded in 1811. It is the oldest military academy in Africa. Traditionally, graduates of the Military Academy are commissioned as officers in the Egyptian Army. However, they may serve in other branches and commands of the Egyptian military establishment.

The Military Academy contains branches, which provide additional training and skills. It also features a prolonged study system so as to graduate more elite officers to serve in the army, such as the Branch of Military Arts and Thunderbolt (El-Sa'ka Forces) School.

== History ==
The founding of the Military Camp in Egypt dates back to the year 1811, when the first Military Camp was set up in the area of Cairo Citadel. In 1820, the Military camp moved to Aswan, and in 1908, it was relocated to the Abbassia Military Barracks in the El-Koba Bridge area. Later the camp expanded and Military School was established in the camp in 1909.

Originally admission in the school was reserved for members of the Egyptian upper class, the Academy changed its rules for admission in 1936 to allow the sons of lower and middle-class families to enter.

In March 1938, the Military School's name changed to become the Royal Egyptian Military Academy. After the Egyptian revolution of 1952, the Military Academy's present site was established and inaugurated by the late Egyptian President Gamal Abdel Nasser on March 3, 1955.

== Degrees and syllabus ==
The Military Academy awards two types of degrees:

- Bachelor's degree in Military Sciences
- Military Studies Completion Certificate (for University graduates who choose a career in the Egyptian Armed Forces upon graduation)

The institution also offers additional courses:

- Language courses in English and Arabic (for officers of foreign countries like Sudan or Germany)

== Notable alumni ==
- Abdel Fattah el-Sisi – current president of Egypt.
- Mohamed Hussein Tantawi - former Defense Minister of Egypt
- Mohamed Kaid Saif – Deputy Commander-in-Chief of Yemen, vice president and member of the Yemeni Revolutionary Command Council of 26 September 1962.
- Gamal Abdel Nasser – second President of Egypt.
- Anwar Sadat – third President of Egypt.
- Abdul Munim Riad – Egyptian Army chief of staff and commander of the Jordanian front in the Six-Day War and War of Attrition.
- Saad el-Shazly – Prominent commander of the Egyptian Army during Yom Kippur War.
- Ahmed Ismail Ali – Chief of Staff during Anwar Sadat's presidency.
- Abd-Al-Minaam Khaleel – Commander of the Egyptian 2nd Army during the Yom Kippur War.
- Abdel Ghani el-Gamasy – Egyptian military leader and Director of Operations for all forces participating in the 1973 Yom Kippur War.
- Abdullahi Ahmed Irro – General in the Somali Armed Forces.
- Ezz El-Dine Zulficar – Egyptian filmmaker.
- Abdel Moneim Saeed
- Hassan Abshir Farah – former Mayor of Mogadishu, Interior Minister of Puntland, and Prime Minister of Somalia.
- Hisham Hafiz – Saudi Arabian newspaper publisher and author.
- Hosni Mubarak – fourth President of Egypt.
- Hussein el-Shafei – member of the Egyptian Revolutionary Command Council and former Vice-President of Egypt.
- Khalid Islambouli – assassin of Anwar Sadat.
- Omar al-Bashir – former president of Sudan.
- Mohammed Aly Fahmy – Commander of the Egyptian Air Defense Command (May 1969 – January 1975) and Chief-of-Staff of the Egyptian Armed Forces (January 1975 – October 1978).
- Mustafa Fahmi Pasha – politician, cabinet minister, and two-time prime minister of Egypt.
- Rashad Mehanna – Egyptian colonel who played a significant role in the Egyptian revolution of 1952.
- Emmerson Mnangagwa – current President of Zimbabwe
- Alwan Hassoun Alwan al-Abousi - former Iraqi Air Force Major General.

== See also ==
- Egyptian Air College
- Egyptian Naval College
