= Abdel Moneim Saeed =

Egyptian Military Personnel

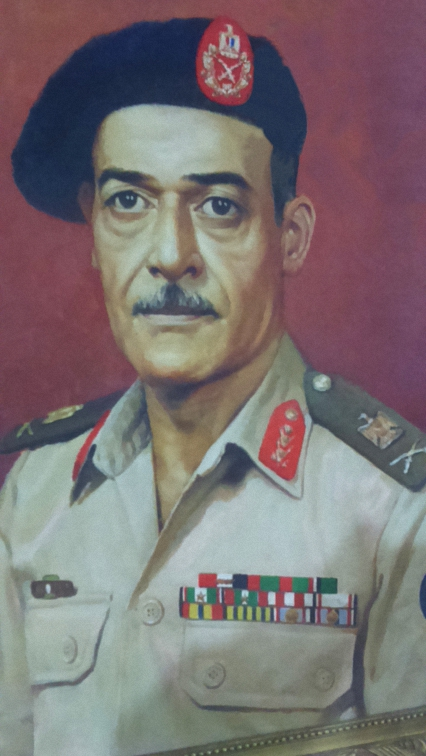
- Governor: South Sinai Governorate 1991 – 1993
- Leader: Chief of Western Military Region (Egypt) 1984 - 1985
- Governor: Suez Governorate 1990 – 1991
- Leader: Second Army (Egypt) 1985 – 1986
- Governor: Red Sea Governorate 1993 – 1996
- Leader: Military Operations Authority (Egypt) 1986 – 1990

Personal details
- Born: May 15, 1933 Mansoura, Egypt
- Died: November 5, 2021 (88 years) Cairo Governorate
- Citizenship: Kingdom of Egypt United Arab Republic Egypt
- Education: Egyptian Military College
- Occupation: Military Personnel
- Awards: Egypt Medal

Military service
- Allegiance: Egyptian Armed Forces
- Rank: Staff Major General
- Battles/wars: Six-Day War; War of Attrition; Yemenite War of 1979; Yom Kippur War

Staff Major General Abdel Moneim Saeed Mahmoud Youssef (born May 16, 1933, died November 5, 2021), was born to an Egyptian family in Mansoura, Dakahlia Governorate. He graduated from the Egyptian Military Academy in 1955, subsequently attending the Egyptian Military College. He participated in the 1967 War, War of Attrition, and October 1973 War, where he served in the Operations Authority in the Planning Branch, which was headed by Major General Mohamed Abdel Ghani el-Gamasy. In 1975, he was appointed to the role of commander of the 4th Infantry Brigade of the 2nd Division.

In 1978, he was awarded a fellowship from the Nasser Military Academy, which enabled him to travel to the United States in 1981 to pursue further studies. In 1982, he was appointed commander of the 3rd Infantry Division, and in 1983, he assumed the role of head of the Planning Branch in the Operations Authority. He was subsequently appointed Chief of Staff of the Western Military Region (Egypt) in 1984 and Commander of the Second Field Army in 1985. In August 1986, he was appointed Chief of the Operations Authority, a post he held until May 1990. He was subsequently appointed Governor of the Suez Governorate. In 1991, he assumed the role of Governor of South Sinai. The following year, he was appointed Governor of the Red Sea Governorate, a position he held until his death.

== Early life ==
During his formative years, he resided with his father, who was engaged in the wool trade in Mansoura, until he reached the age of ten. His mother died at a relatively young age, at approximately 39 years old. Two years later, his father also died. This resulted in his older sister assuming responsibility for the upbringing of him and his siblings. In 1942, she relocated the family to Cairo, where they settled in Al-Azhar Al-Sharif neighborhood. He completed his primary education at Al-Gamaleya Primary School and subsequently attended Al-Helmiya Secondary School. During his final year of secondary education, which was then referred to as the "Tawjihi" examination, he pursued the mathematics stream and achieved high marks. He successfully applied to the Faculty of Engineering at Fouad I University (now Cairo University) in 1952, just a few months before the July Revolution.

=== July Revolution ===
However, his plans underwent a significant alteration with the advent of the July 23, 1952 Revolution, which sought to establish a national army. In light of these principles, he resolved to alter his trajectory and submitted his application to the Egyptian Military College.

== Military career ==
Abdel Moneim Saeed received his commission from the Egyptian Military College on March 3, 1955, in a ceremony attended by President Gamal Abdel Nasser. He was subsequently assigned to the Major General Infantry in Alexandria, which was commanded by Staff Officer Anwar El-Qadi. By the end of 1958, he had been transferred to the Infantry School, where he served as a small arms instructor. He continued in this role at this prestigious institution, which trained all infantry officers from platoon leaders to brigade commanders. During this period, he was promoted to the rank of Captain.

He applied to the Command and Staff College and was awarded the first-place. In 1965, he undertook a period of study at the Frunze Military Academy in the Soviet Union (now Russia), where he obtained a Master's degree in Military science. He remained in that position until the outbreak of the June 1967 War. Upon his return from the Soviet Union following the completion of his staff course, he was promoted to the rank of major and obtained a Master's degree in Military Sciences in 1968. He was subsequently assigned to the Second Army, where he served as a planning officer under the direction of Major General Abdul Munim Khaleel, the planning chief. Additionally, he served as an operations officer in the Second Army (Egypt) branch, collaborating with senior army leaders, including Major General Ahmad Ismail Ali, Major General Adli Said, Major General Tawfik Abdel Nabi, and Major General Abdul Munim Khaleel.

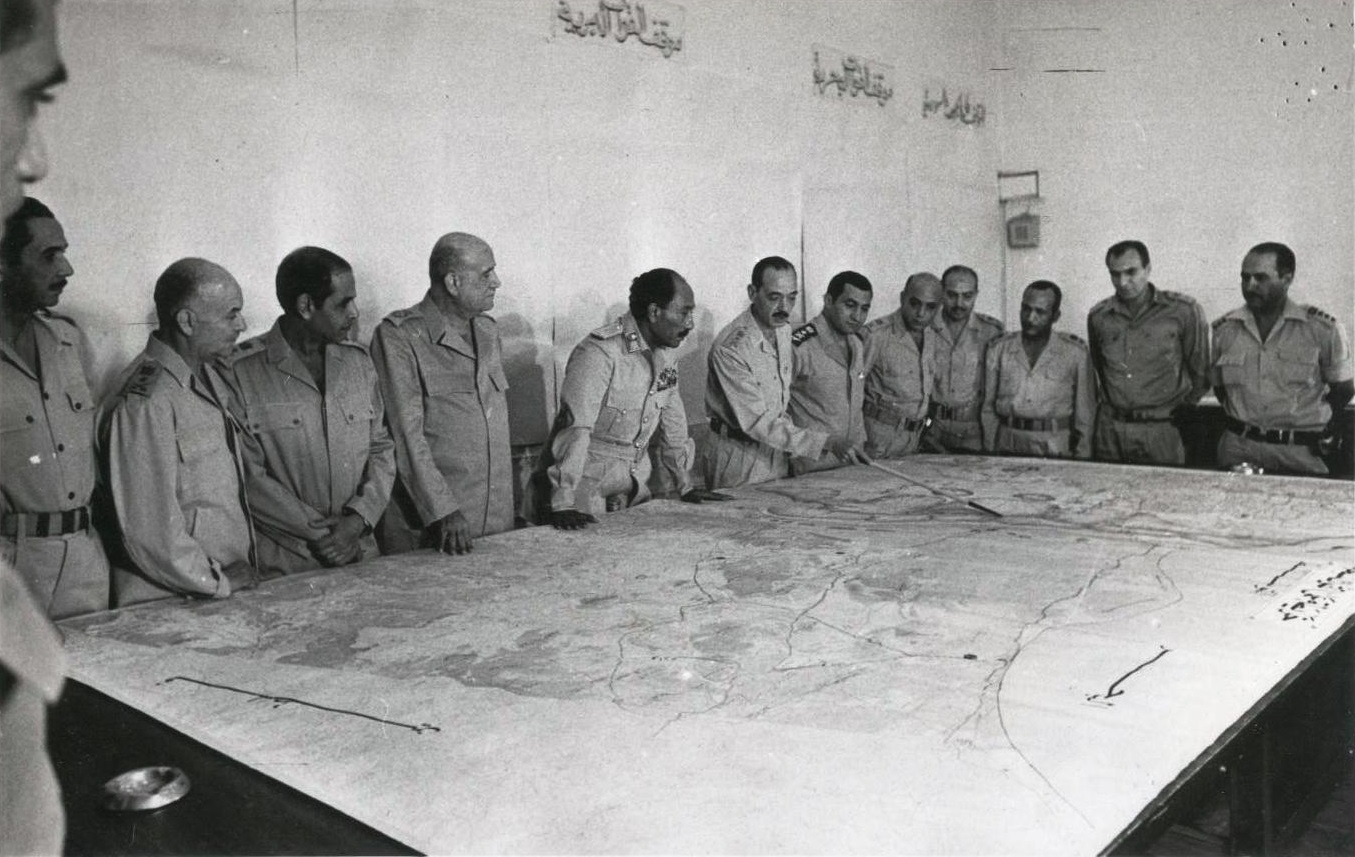
October War Leaders

During this period, he oversaw the rebuilding of Egyptian Armed Forces and implemented a continuous training program to compensate for the significant losses caused by the war. He worked in the operations branch, where he was responsible for coordinating with supporting forces, including El-Sa'ka Forces, Egyptian Navy, and Egyptian Air Force, as well as developing training plans. He collaborated with the Third Army to define tasks in Fayed area and subsequently presented them to the Ministry of Defense. Due to his evident excellence, he gained widespread admiration, which resulted in a delay in his appointment as a battalion commander until 1970. At that time, he was promoted to colonel and appointed as the commander of the 149th Battalion of the 30th Independent Infantry Brigade in Port Said for one year. In 1975, he was appointed to the position of commander of the 4th Infantry Brigade of the 2nd Division. In 1978, he was awarded a fellowship from the Nasser Higher Military Academy, which enabled him to travel to United States in 1981 to pursue further studies. In 1982, he was appointed commander of the 3rd Infantry Division. The following year, he assumed the role of head of the Planning Branch in the Operations Authority. He was subsequently appointed Chief of Staff of the Western Military Region in 1984 and Commander of the Second Field Army in 1985. In August 1986, he was appointed Chief of the Operations Authority, a post he held until May 1990. At that point, he concluded his military service with the rank of Chief of Operations of the Armed Forces. He then assumed the position of Governor of Suez, and in 1991, he was appointed Governor of South Sinai. In 1993, he was appointed Governor of Red Sea.

== Military engagements ==
=== War of Attrition ===
Upon his return from Moscow, Abdel Moneim Saeed was appointed to the role of planning officer in the Second Army. In this capacity, he assumed responsibility for operational planning, working alongside senior army officials under the leadership of General Abdul Munim Khaleel, the commander of the Second Army. During this period, he participated in the apprehension of multiple detainees, including the Israeli officer Assaf Yaguri. In this capacity, he devised strategic blueprints that were subsequently presented to the army commanders, thereby establishing the foundation for the October War. The ceasefire was declared on August 8, 1970, marking the commencement of preparations for the October War. He was subsequently appointed to the Operations Authority in the Planning Branch, which was headed by Major General Mohamed Abdel Ghani el-Gamasy.

He continued to serve as the planning officer for the Second Army under the command of General Abdul Munim Khaleel during the War of Attrition, where he was also responsible for monthly planning. Abdel Moneim Saeed remained in the Operations Division, coordinating with supporting forces, including El-Sa'ka Forces, Egyptian Navy, and Egyptian Air Force. He also organized monthly training plans and worked with the Third Army to coordinate tasks in the Fayed area before presenting them to the Minister of War in Cairo. His exceptional skills and dedication were so appreciated by his superiors that his appointment as a battalion commander was delayed until 1970 when he was promoted to the rank of colonel. He was then appointed Commander of the 149th Battalion of the 30th Independent Infantry Brigade in Port Said, a position he held for one year.

=== October War ===
After the War of Attrition, Abdel Moneim Saeed was appointed as a battalion commander and later selected as a planning officer in the Operations Directorate of the Egyptian Armed Forces. He played an important role during the October War by being present in the main operations room after Field Marshal Ahmad Ismail Ali was appointed Minister of War. The war was directed from this room, accompanied by the late President Anwar Sadat. Here, he was privy to the attack plan and worked on war strategies with senior military leaders. Speaking about the war plan, he said: "The October War plan was predicated on the use of air forces by the armed forces to conduct one or two strikes on strategic targets in Israel, including airports and radar installations. Concurrently, I was situated in the central operations room, situated within the General Command of the Armed Forces in Cairo. However, this room was not openly accessible; it was instead a clandestine underground facility. At 1:00 PM, President Anwar Sadat entered the operations center in the main room to oversee the movements of the army branches and all of their leaders."

He proceeded to delineate the room's layout, which he described as a square room with four principal corners. The largest of the room's four corners was occupied by a substantial table at which President Anwar Sadat, Field Marshal Ahmad Ismail, the Minister of Defense and General Commander, and Chief of Staff Lieutenant General Saad el-Shazly were seated, along with the liaison officer responsible for coordinating with Syria during the war. Abdel Moneim Saeed, along with two other officers holding the rank of lieutenant colonel, was tasked with drafting the orders to be issued by the minister. In front of them was a large map displaying the war plan, with another table situated nearby where the colonel-ranked officers were seated. Abdel Moneim Saeed was one of these officers, responsible for overseeing the implementation of the plan, working in shifts to ensure continuous monitoring.

=== Managing the October War from the Operations Room ===
Abdel Moneim Saeed was a planning officer in the Operations Authority and one of ten officers in the planning branch responsible for developing the war plan. This plan was then presented to the Chief of Operations, who submitted it to the Chief of Staff for approval. The role of this branch included monitoring operations and ensuring the implementation of the planned strategy, modifying it by any emerging variables.

"I served as a planning officer in the primary war room of the Armed Forces' central command. In this room, a map was positioned on a central table. Additionally, an external room was designated for monitoring the Second Army, another for the Third Army, and supplementary rooms were allocated for the Air Force, Navy, and Air Defense. All this information was conveyed to the main war room, where the overall situation and its changes were managed. Information regarding the disposition of our forces and those of the enemy was received, the problem was evaluated, and a report was prepared for the Chief of Operations, who then conveyed it to the Minister and the Chief of Staff. As the battle progressed, we monitored the situation moment by moment and made decisions that were then approved by the General Command or issued as instructions to the various branches or civilian armies. "This was the function of the main war room, and our role as planning officers was to facilitate this process."

=== After the October Victory ===
From October 6th to October 28th, during the ceasefire, he remained in the operations room, never leaving for any other place, and remained there throughout the entirety of the war. He slept beneath the operations table in the meeting room until the war's conclusion. Thereafter, he transferred to the Operations Authority and eventually became a brigade commander.

== Positions held ==
He held the position of governor in numerous provinces, exemplifying the values espoused by the Armed Forces and displaying leadership in a variety of roles. In his capacity as a principal commander during October War, he occupied several leadership roles, including that of Commander of the Second Army and Chief of the Armed Forces Operations Authority.

His military career includes participation in several critical wars fought by the Egyptian army, such as the Yemen War. Additionally, he served as the Egyptian Military Attaché at the Egyptian Embassy in Iraq from 1982 to 1985.

Upon his return to Egypt, he served as the Head of the Planning Branch in 1975 and was subsequently appointed Commander of the 4th Infantry Brigade of the 2nd Division. In 1978, he was awarded a fellowship from the Nasser Military Academy, which enabled him to travel to United States in 1981 to pursue further studies. In 1982, he was appointed Commander of the 3rd Infantry Division. The following year, he assumed the role of Head of the Planning Branch of the Operations Authority and, in 1984, that of Chief of Staff of the Western Region.

In 1985, he assumed the role of Commander of the Second Army and in August 1986 was appointed Chief of the Operations Authority, a position he held until May 1990. Thereafter, he transitioned to civilian life, serving as Governor of Suez and South Sinai in 1991 and the Red Sea in 1993.

== Death ==
On the morning of Friday, November 5, 2021, Abdel Moneim Saeed, former chief of the Armed Forces Operations Authority, died. And the General Command of the Armed Forces issued an official statement mourning his loss. In the statement, he was described as "a son of the Armed Forces and a commander from the glorious October War."

== Awards ==
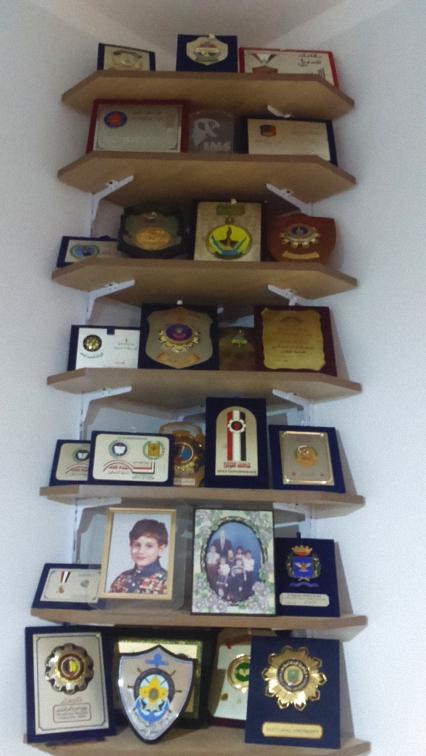
Decorations, honors and medals Major General Abdel Moneim Saeed

=== Military ===
- Second Class Military Courage Decoration (after the October War).
- Medal of Liberation.
- Commemorative Decoration of Establishment of the United Arab Republic
- Military Decoration of Evacuation
- Military Decoration of Independence
- Victory Decoration
- Liberation of Sinai Decoration (25 April 1982)
- Military Duty Decoration, Second Class
- Training Decoration
- Distinguished Service Decoration
- Longevity and Exemplary Service Medal
- Army Day Medal
- Wounded of War Medal
- 23rd 1952 Revolution 10th Anniversary Medal (1962)
- 23rd 1952 Revolution 20th Anniversary Medal (1972)
- October War 1973 Medal
