= Abdul Munim Riad =

Egyptian general (1919–1969)

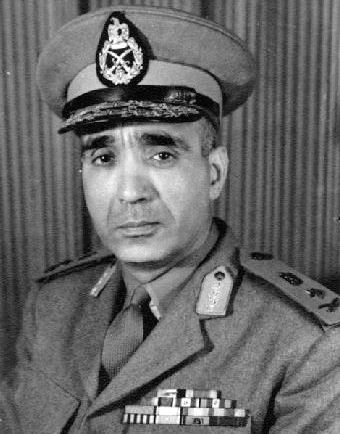
- Born: 22 October 1919; Tanta, Sultanate of Egypt
- Died: 9 March 1969 (aged 49) Suez Canal zone, United Arab Republic
- Allegiance: Kingdom of Egypt (1938–1953); Republic of Egypt (1953–1958); United Arab Republic (1958–1969)
- Service years: 1938–1969
- Rank: Lieutenant general
- Conflicts: Second World War; 1948 Arab–Israeli War; Suez Crisis; Six Day War; War of Attrition †

Abdul Munim Riad (Arabic: ;عبد المنعم رياض 22 October 1919 – 9 March 1969) was an Egyptian military officer and the Chief of Staff of the Egyptian Armed Forces from 1967 to 1969. He commanded the Jordanian Armed Forces during the 1967 Six-Day War and later led the Egyptian forces in the War of Attrition, where he and several of his aides were killed in action in 1969. His death on 9 March is observed as Egyptian Martyrs' Day (Arabic: يوم الشهيد).

== Early life ==
Riad was born on 22 October 1919 in Tanta, a city in the Nile Delta. His father, Mohammed Riad, was an instructor at the Royal Military Academy and a lieutenant colonel in the Egyptian military. In 1928, Mohammed was stationed in El-Arish in the Sinai Peninsula, which allowed Riad to become familiar with the arid and mountainous landscape of the region. During this period of his childhood, Riad observed his father's military activities, played with Bedouin children in the area, and, according to Egyptian military historian Mohammed al-Jawady, gained experience as a scout.

In 1930, Riad's family moved to the port city of Alexandria following his father's promotion to colonel and subsequent assignment as commander of the 2nd Infantry Battalion. Riad completed his secondary education in the city, graduating in 1936, and then began attending the fall semester at Qasr el-Aini Medical School in Cairo. While there, he participated in student-led protests calling for an end to British colonial influence in the country.

== Military career ==
Later that year, the Anglo-Egyptian Treaty was signed, mandating the opening of Egypt's military academies to individuals from all walks of life. Despite his mother's opposition to a military career, Riad pursued his original interest by entering the Royal Military Academy on 6 October. At the academy, he met fellow cadets such as Gamal Abdel Nasser, Anwar Sadat, Saad el-Shazly, and Ahmad Ismail Ali. According to Al-Jawady, Riad possessed a strong personality, demonstrated a thorough understanding of the curriculum, and remained determined to improve his mental and physical abilities in military matters.

In 1938, Riad graduated with honors, specializing in anti-aircraft weapons. The dean, Colonel Futuh Bey, described him as an exemplary student who always did his best and could be relied upon. As a second lieutenant, Riad joined the newly established air defense unit in Zamalek under the command of a British captain. During this time, he gained a deeper understanding of ballistics, various types of anti-aircraft weapons, the principles of trajectory, arithmetic calculations for hitting airborne objects, and the English language.

When World War II began in late 1939, many Egyptian officers were sent to the front, including Riad, who had been promoted to first lieutenant and was in charge of anti-aircraft gun crews in Alexandria. He also worked as an instructor and trainer at the Abbasia Barracks Artillery School in Cairo. He frequently transported his graduates to the Alexandria front and led them as their commanding officer. Riad's exemplary wartime performance earned him the admiration of his senior commanders and recognition as one of the few selected to attend the General Staff College in Cairo. He received a Master's degree in Military Science in 1944 and was subsequently assigned to Abbasia as a permanent anti-aircraft instructor.

=== Post-1952 revolution ===
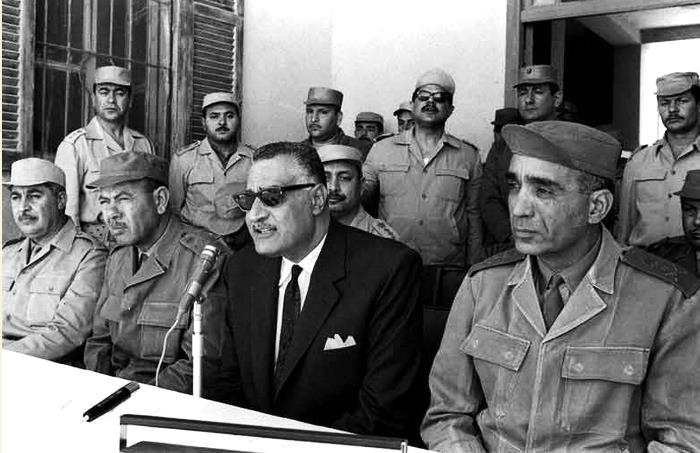
Riad (seated first from right) alongside President Gamal Abdel Nasser (second from right) and General Commander Mohamed Fawzi (third from right) at Suez Canal front during the War of Attrition with Israel, February 1968

In 1960, Riad was appointed Chief of Staff of the Artillery Corps. In 1961, he assumed the role of Vice President of the Operations Division under the Chairman of the War Staff and served as Advisor to the Air Force Command for Air Defense. Between 1962 and 1963, as a Major General, he attended a special session at the School of Anti-Aircraft Missile Artillery. In 1964, he was appointed Chief of Staff of the Consolidated Arab Command. In 1966, he was promoted to Lieutenant General and received a scholarship to attend the Higher War College of the Nasser Higher Military Academy.

He received numerous medals and awards, including the Long Service Medal, the Order of Merit, the Order of the Golden Degree of National Rice, and the Order of the Star of Honor. He was also awarded the Good Example Medal as a Lebanese Senior Officer and the Jordan Globe Medallion, First Class.

In May 1967, Lt. General Riad was appointed commander of the Advanced Command Center in Amman after King Hussein of Jordan traveled to Cairo to sign the Joint Defense Agreement. When the 1967 war broke out, Riad was selected to command the front in Jordan. On 11 June of the same year, he was appointed Chief of Staff of the Armed Forces and worked with the Egyptian Minister of War and Commander of the Armed Forces, Mohamed Fawzi, to rebuild and reorganize the army. In 1968, Riad was appointed Assistant Secretary General of the League of Arab States.

During the War of Attrition, General Riad led the Egyptian forces to several victories. In one notable battle, he successfully prevented Israeli forces from gaining control of the Egyptian city of Port Fuad, located on the Suez Canal, thanks to a small infantry force that effectively defended the city. Riad also oversaw the destruction of the Israeli destroyer Eilat on 21 October 1967 and was responsible for shooting down several Israeli warplanes in 1967 and 1968.

== Death ==
Riad oversaw the Egyptian plan to destroy the Bar Lev Line during the War of Attrition. Recognizing the importance of its implementation, he set the starting date for the plan as Saturday, 8 March 1969. The Egyptian forces launched an intense offensive along the front line, inflicting heavy casualties and extensive damage to the Bar Lev Line positions. The Israelis suffered significant losses during a few hours of the heaviest artillery battles on the Suez front before 1973.

On the morning of 9 March 1969, Riad personally visited the front line to observe the outcome of the battle. While there, the Israelis opened fire, and a mortar shell fired by Israeli forces hit his location, resulting in the deaths of Riad and several aides.

== Legacy ==
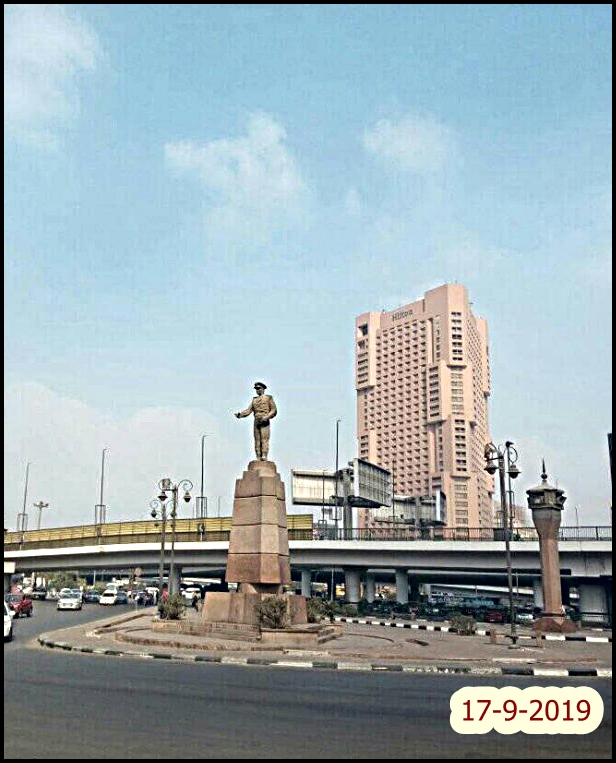
Riad statue in Tahrir Square, Cairo

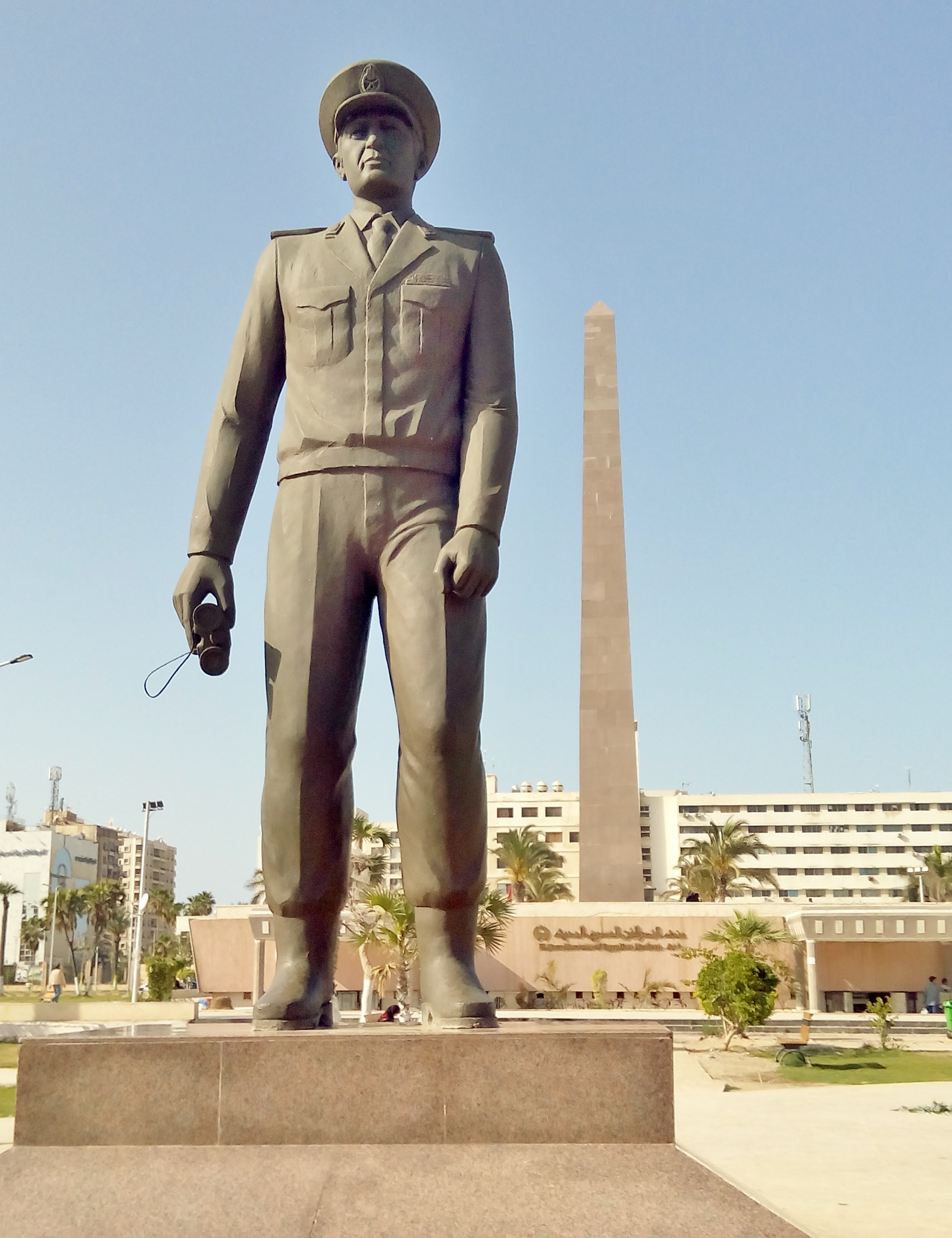
Riad statue in Port Said

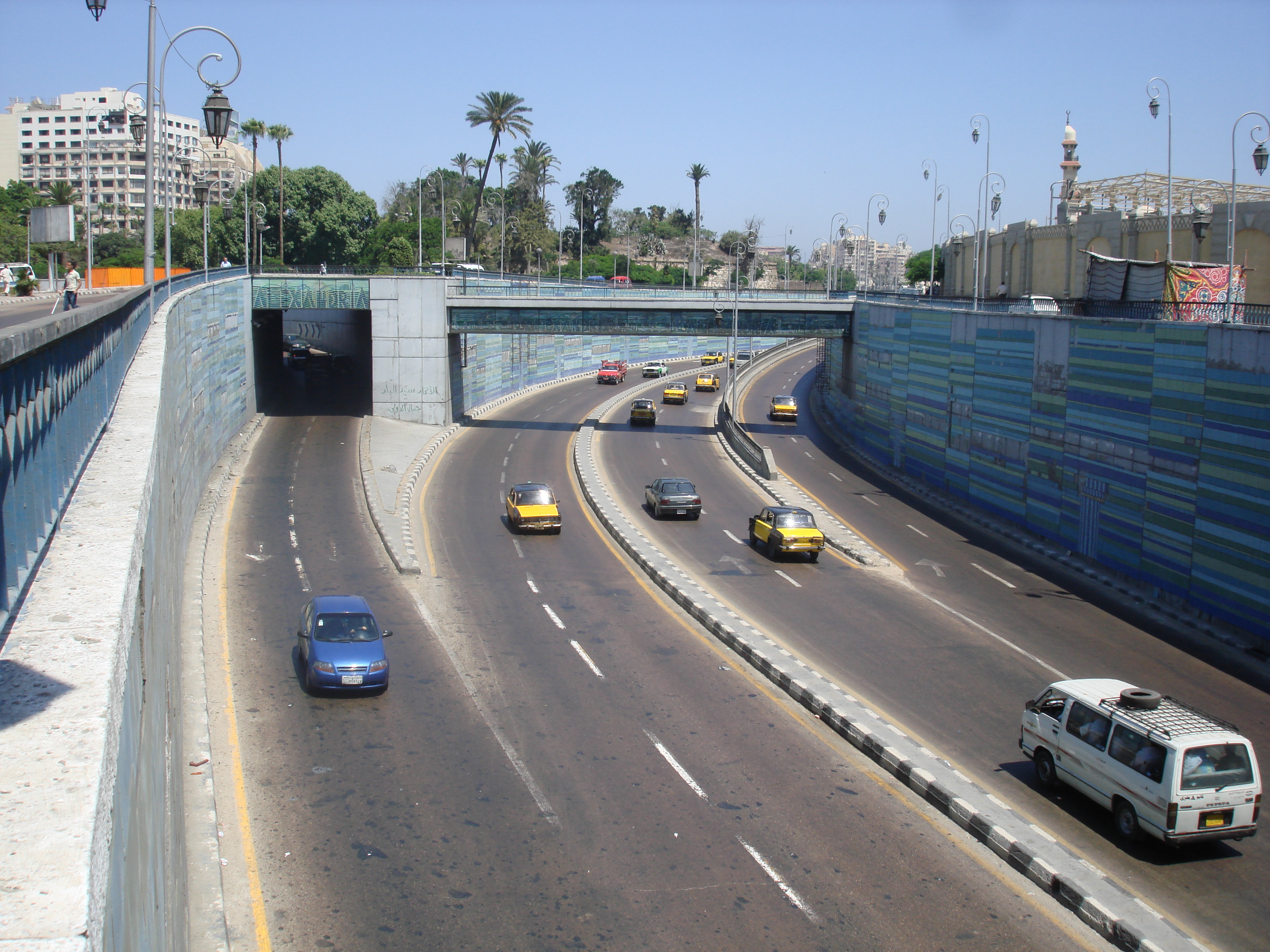
This underpass in Alexandria was named after Riad

After his death, President Gamal Abdel Nasser posthumously awarded him Egypt's highest military decoration, the First Star Honors Military Rank. 9 March is now observed as a day to honor his memory. His name has been given to one of Egypt's most famous squares and a street in Mohandessin, Cairo.
