= Ahmed Fathy Khalifa =

Egyptian Army officer (born 1966)

- أحمد فتحي خليفة
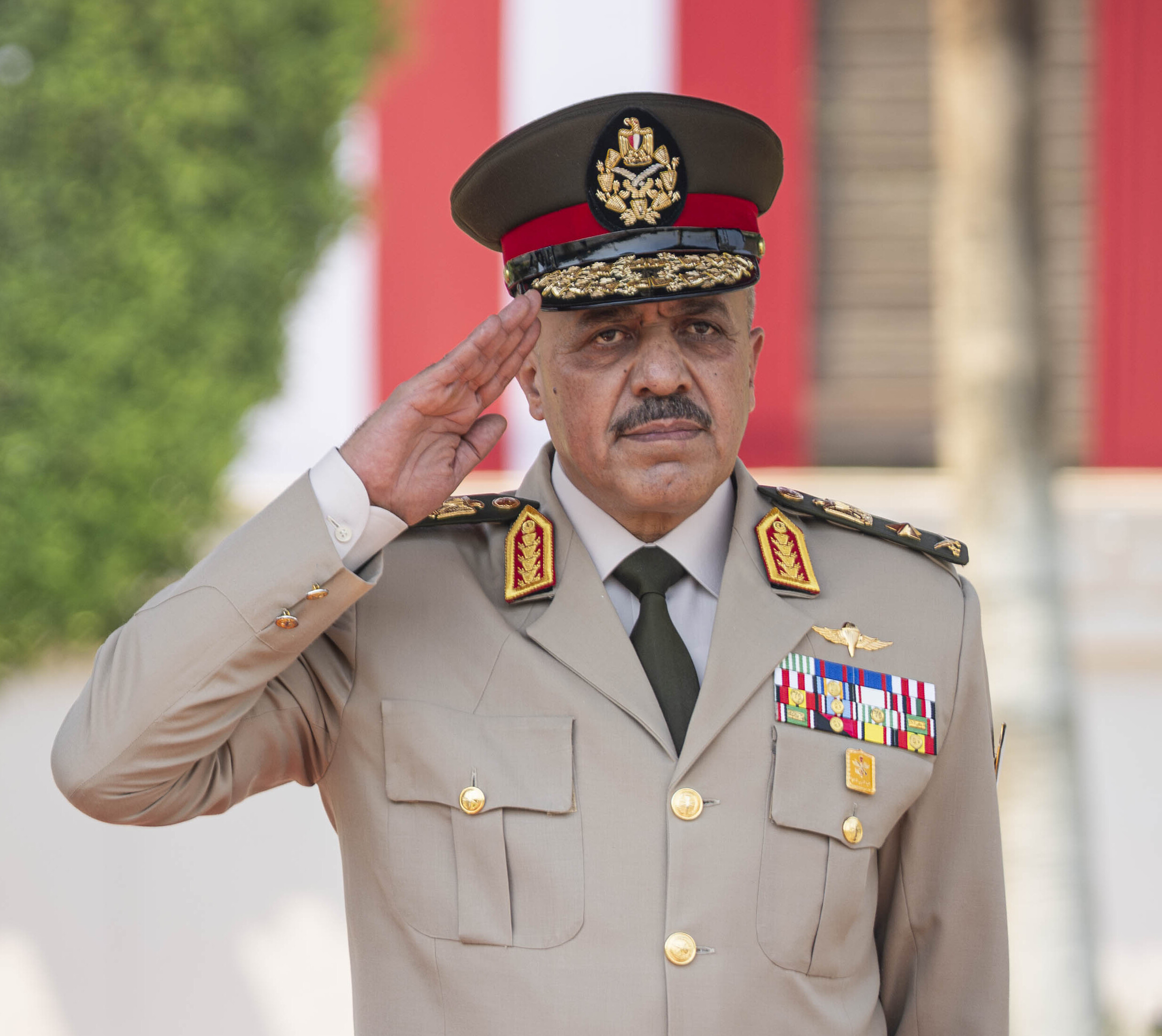

Chief of Staff of the Armed Forces
- Incumbent
- Assumed office 3 July 2024
- Prime Minister: Mostafa Madbouly
- Preceded by: Lieutenant General Osama Askar

Personal details
- Born: Ahmad Fathy Ibrahim Khalifa; 17 October 1966 (age 59)
- Party: Independent
- Education: Egyptian Military College
- Awards: First Class Duty Medal, the Excellent Service Medal, the Sinai Comprehensive Operation Medal, the January 25 Medal, the June 30 Medal, the Artillery Golden Jubilee Medal, the October 1973 Victory Golden Jubilee Medal, the Long Service and Good Example Medal, the Medal The Golden Jubilee of the Revolution, the Silver Jubilee Medal for the Liberation of Sinai, and the Silver Jubilee Medal for the Victory of October 1973

Military service
- Branch/service: Egyptian Armed Forces
- Years of service: 1987 - current
- Rank: Lieutenant General
- Unit: Artillery

Lieutenant General Ahmad Fathy Ibrahim Khalifa (Egyptian Arabic: أحمد فتحي إبراهيم خليفة; born 17 October 1966) is an Egyptian military officer who serves as the incumbent chief of staff of the Egyptian Armed Forces since 3 July 2024.

== Military qualification ==
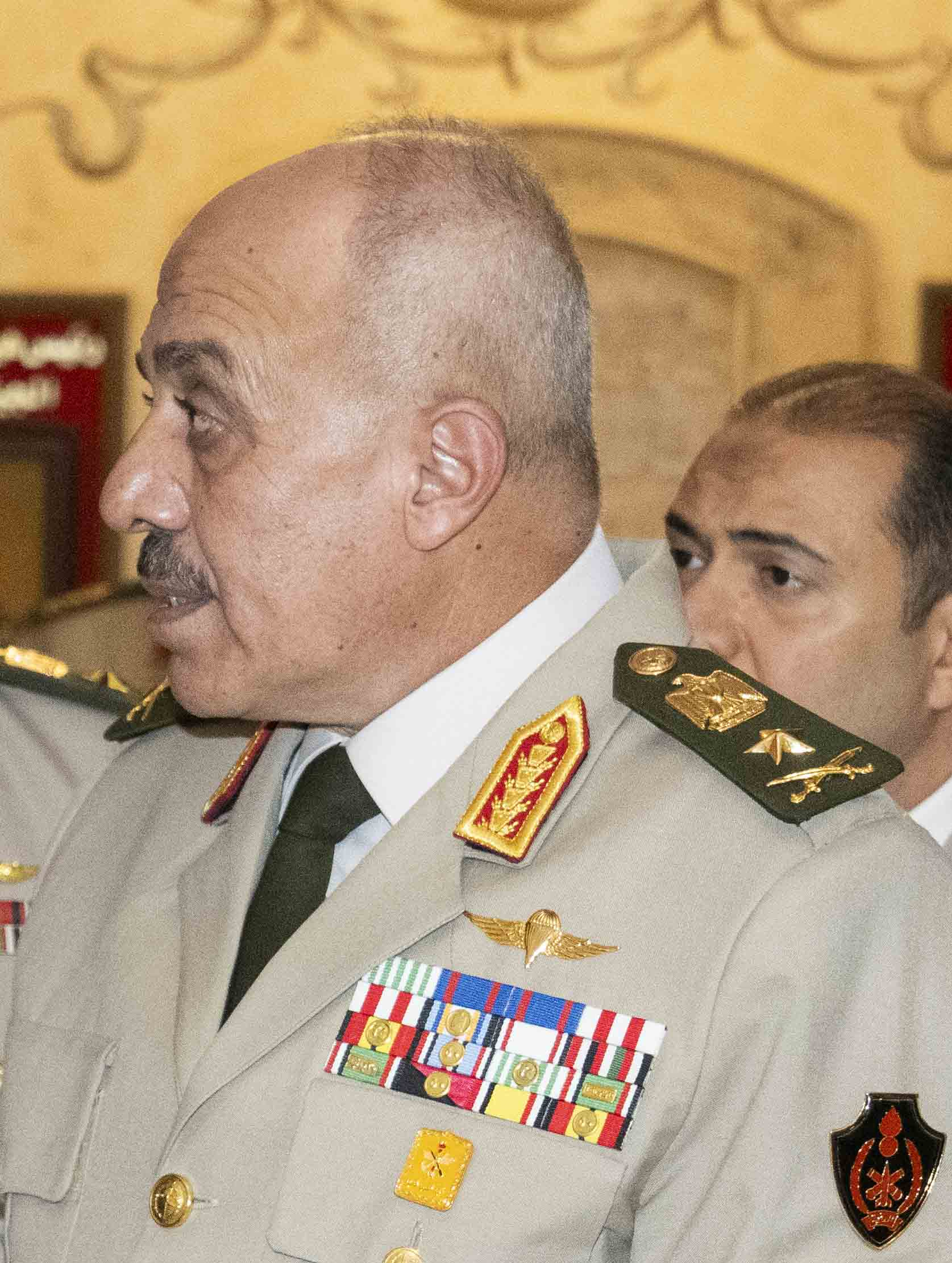
Lieutenant General Ahmed Fathy Khalifa in Cairo, Egypt, August 25, 2024

He graduated from the Military College in 1987, Class 80.

- Bachelor of Military Sciences from the Military College.
- He holds a Master's degree in military sciences from the Command and Staff College.
- He holds a Higher War College Fellowship from the Military Academy for Postgraduate and Strategic Studies.

== Career ==
Responsible for all leadership positions in the artillery until he was appointed assistant director of the artillery, then Director of the Artillery Institute, then director of the Morale Affairs Department, then head of the Armed Forces Organization and Administration Authority, then head of the Armed Forces Operations Authority, then secretary-general of the Ministry of Defense.

== Honors and decorations ==
He won a number of orders and medals, including the First Class Duty Medal, the Excellent Service Medal, the Sinai Comprehensive Operation Medal, the January 25 Medal, the June 30 Medal, the Artillery Golden Jubilee Medal, the October 1973 Victory Golden Jubilee Medal, the Long Service and Good Example Medal, the Medal The Golden Jubilee of the Revolution, the Silver Jubilee Medal for the Liberation of Sinai, and the Silver Jubilee Medal for the Victory of October 1973.
