= Chief of Staff of the Armed Forces (Egypt) =

Chief of staff of the Egyptian armed forces

Chief of the General Staff of the Egyptian Armed Forces
- رئيس أركان حرب القوات المسلحة
- Seal of the Egyptian Armed Forces

- Flag of the Egyptian Army

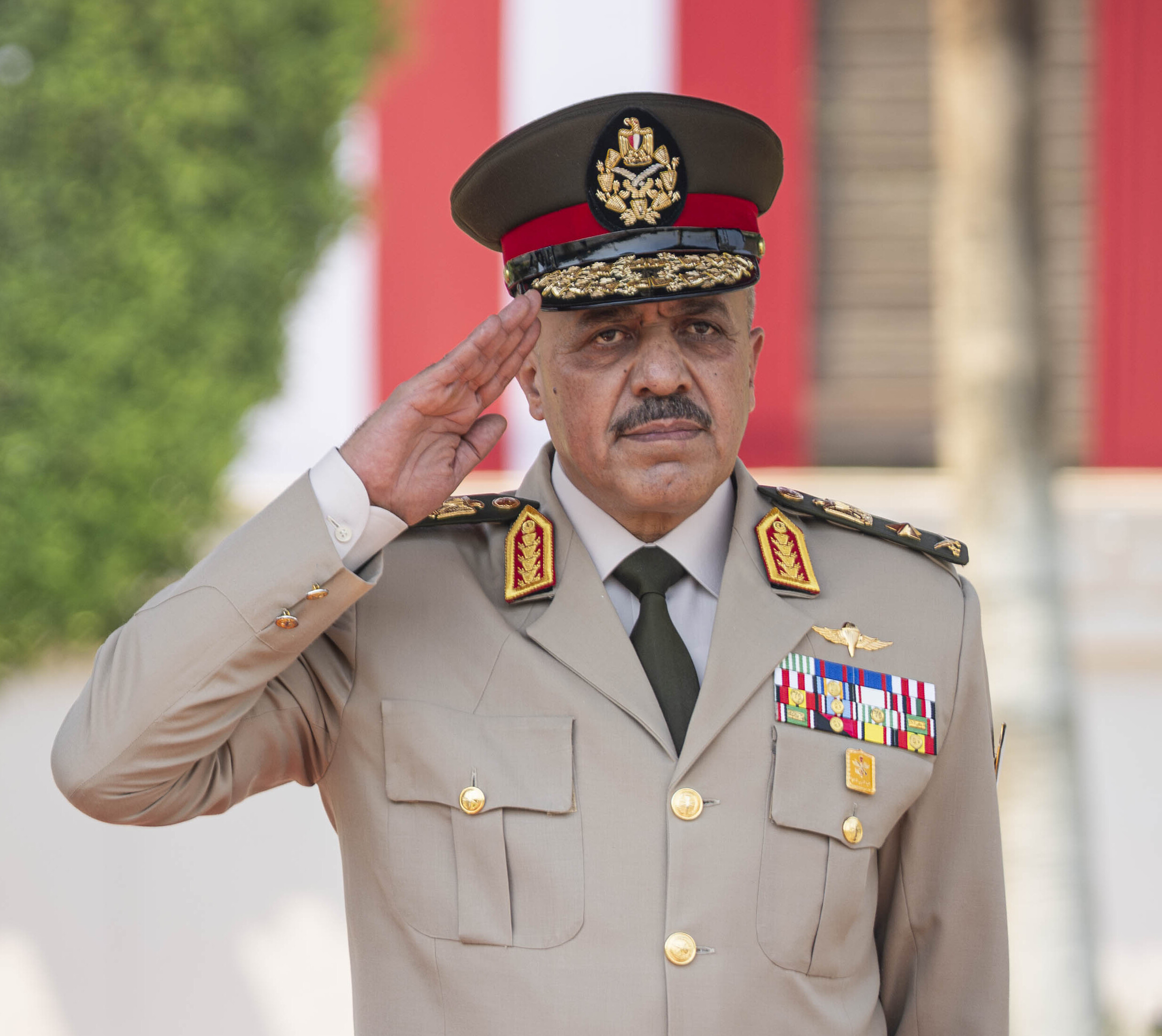
- Incumbent; Lieutenant General Ahmed Fathy Khalifa since 3 July 2024
- Egyptian Armed Forces
- Member of: General Staff; Supreme Council of the Armed Forces
- Reports to: Minister of Defense
- Seat: Cairo
- Appointer: President of Egypt
- Formation: 9 September 1952; 74 years ago
- First holder: Lieutenant General Mohamed Ibrahim Selim
- Website: Official website

The Chief of the General Staff of the Armed Forces (Egyptian Arabic: رئيس أركان حرب القوات المسلحة, romanized: Rayiys 'arkan harb alquaat almusalaha) is the second-in-command of the Egyptian Armed Forces, following the Minister of Defense and the President. The Chief of the General Staff typically holds the second-highest military rank in the Armed Forces. The commanders of the Navy, Air Force and Air Defense Forces report to the Chief of the General Staff, while the Army is under the direct command of the Chief of Staff of the Armed Forces.

== List of chiefs (before 1952) ==
- Mahmoud Shokry (1937–1939)
- Aziz Ali al-Misri (1939–1940)
- Ibrahim Atallah Pasha (1940–1948)
- Osman al-Mahdi Pasha (1948–1952)
- Hussein Farid Pasha (1952)

== List of chiefs ==
The following is a list of chiefs of the General Staff of Egypt since the Egyptian revolution of 1952.

| No. | Portrait | Chief of the General Staff | Took office | Left office | Time in office | Defence branch | Ref. |
|---|---|---|---|---|---|---|---|
| 1 | Mohamed Ibrahim Selim | Lieutenant General; Mohamed Ibrahim Selim (1916–?) | 9 September 1952 | 8 May 1959 | 6 years, 241 days | Egyptian Army | |
| 2 | Abdel Hakim Amer | Lieutenant General; Abdel Hakim Amer (1919–1967) | 9 May 1959 | 24 March 1964 | 4 years, 320 days | Egyptian Army | |
| 3 | Mohamed Fawzi | Lieutenant General; Mohamed Fawzi (1915–2000) | 24 March 1964 | 10 June 1967 | 3 years, 78 days | Egyptian Army | |
| 4 | Abdul Munim Riad | Lieutenant General; Abdul Munim Riad (1919–1969) | 11 June 1967 | 9 March 1969 † | 1 year, 271 days | Egyptian Army | |
| 5 | Ahmad Ismail Ali | Lieutenant General; Ahmad Ismail Ali (1917–1974) | 10 March 1969 | 11 September 1969 | 185 days | Egyptian Army | |
| 6 | Mohammed Ahmed Sadek | Lieutenant General; Mohammed Ahmed Sadek (1917–1991) | 11 September 1969 | 11 May 1971 | 1 year, 242 days | Egyptian Army | |
| 7 | Saad el-Shazly | Lieutenant General; Saad el-Shazly (1922–2011) | 14 May 1971 | 12 December 1973 | 2 years, 212 days | Egyptian Army | |
| 8 | Mohamed Abdel Ghani el-Gamasy | Lieutenant General; Mohamed Abdel Ghani el-Gamasy (1921–2003) | 12 December 1973 | 26 December 1974 | 1 year, 14 days | Egyptian Army | |
| 9 | Mohammed Aly Fahmy | Lieutenant General; Mohammed Aly Fahmy (1920–1990) | 28 December 1974 | 4 October 1978 | 3 years, 280 days | Egyptian Air Defense Forces | |
| 10 | Ahmed Badawi | Lieutenant General; Ahmed Badawi (1927–1981) | 5 October 1978 | 14 May 1980 | 1 year, 222 days | Egyptian Army | |
| 11 | Abd Al-Halim Abu-Ghazala | Lieutenant General; Abd Al-Halim Abu-Ghazala (1930–2008) | 17 May 1980 | 3 March 1981 | 293 days | Egyptian Army | |
| 12 | Abd Rab el-Nabi | Lieutenant General; Abd Rab el-Nabi (1930–2022) | 4 March 1981 | 16 July 1983 | 2 years, 134 days | Egyptian Army | |
| 13 | Ibrahim El-Orabi | Lieutenant General; Ibrahim El-Orabi (1931–2019) | 16 July 1983 | 13 August 1987 | 4 years, 59 days | Egyptian Army | |
| 14 | Safi al-Din Abu Shnaaf | Lieutenant General; Safi al-Din Abu Shnaaf (1931–2018) | 13 August 1987 | 20 May 1991 | 3 years, 249 days | Egyptian Army | |
| 14 | Salah Halabi | Lieutenant General; Salah Halabi (1937–2014) | 20 May 1991 | 30 October 1995 | 4 years, 163 days | Egyptian Army | |
| 15 | Magdy Hatata | Lieutenant General; Magdy Hatata (born 1941) | 31 October 1995 | 31 October 2001 | 6 years | Egyptian Army | |
| 16 | Hamdy Wahiba | Lieutenant General; Hamdy Wahiba | 31 October 2001 | 29 October 2005 | 3 years, 363 days | Egyptian Army | |
| 16 | Sami Hafez Anan | Lieutenant General; Sami Hafez Anan (born 1948) | 30 October 2005 | 12 August 2012 | 6 years, 287 days | Egyptian Air Defense Forces | |
| 16 | Sedki Sobhy | Lieutenant General; Sedki Sobhy (born 1955) | 12 August 2012 | 27 March 2014 | 1 year, 196 days | Egyptian Army | |
| 17 | Mahmoud Hegazy | Lieutenant General; Mahmoud Hegazy (born 1953) | 27 March 2014 | 28 October 2017 | 3 years, 215 days | Egyptian Army | |
| 18 | Mohammed Farid Hegazy | Lieutenant General; Mohammed Farid Hegazy (born 1954) | 28 October 2017 | 27 October 2021 | 3 years, 364 days | Egyptian Army | |
| 19 | Osama Askar | Lieutenant General; Osama Askar (born 1957) | 27 October 2021 | 2 July 2024 | 2 years, 249 days* | Egyptian Army | |
| 20 | Ahmed Fathy Khalifa | Lieutenant General; Ahmed Fathy Khalifa (born 1966) | 3 July 2024 | Incumbent | 2 years, 137 days* | Egyptian Army | |

* Incumbent's time in office last updated: 17 November 2026.

== See also ==
- Egyptian Armed Forces
- Ministry of Defense (Egypt)
