= Military Technical College =

Egyptian military college

Coordinates: 30.079°N 31.296°E

- الكلية الفنية العسكرية
- Former name: الكلية العسكرية للعلوم (Military College of Sciences)
- Motto: الإيمان، العلم، العمل
- Motto in English: Faith, science, work
- Type: Military college
- Established: 1958
- Founder: Mohamed Ibrahim Selim
- Director: Moataz Ibrahim Abu el-Nour
- Location: Kubri el-Qobbah, Cairo, Egypt
- Website: www.mtc.edu.eg

The Military Technical College (MTC) (Egyptian Arabic: الكلية الفنية العسكرية) is an Egyptian military college that graduates military engineers with a bachelor's degree in engineering to distribute them to various formations of the armed forces to serve in peacetime or war. It was established in 1958 and was called the Military College of Sciences (الكلية العسكرية للعلوم), and the educational process within the college was managed in cooperation with the Czechslovak Military Academy Brno.

== History ==
After Egypt had been without schools for technological military education for a long time, work began to achieve the basic principle of the July 23 Revolution by creating capable and strong armed forces. As a step towards building this army, the importance of keeping up with modern technologies and trends in the fields of armament emerged. The idea of establishing a military technical academy seemed to represent a basic necessity to supply the army with engineers who represent the technical ideas side.

The idea of establishing a military technical college emerged with the arms deal concluded by the revolution in 1954 with Czechoslovakia, after it failed to obtain weapons from the West to rebuild the army on modern systems, and then the need arose to establish a military technical college to graduate engineering cadres capable of developing modern armament equipment and carrying out technical insurance tasks for it. It was actually established in 1958 in cooperation with the Czech Military Academy Brno, to graduate engineer officers to work in the Egyptian Armed Forces.

On October 27, 1957, Special Military Order No. 344 was issued, which stipulated: “Based on the directives of the Egyptian leadership and studies carried out by the armed forces, the establishment of a military college of sciences will graduate the specialized officers the army needs. Thus, the army dispenses with foreign expertise and is independent in its research, studies, and artistic works, and its goal of creating the desired generation is achieved." The actual work began after the issuance of a special military order dated November 17, 1958 regarding the stages of study at the college and the conditions for admission, by accepting an elite group of officers from the armed forces to study there in several preliminary stages, the first of which is the first stage (which is the intermediate stage and lasts for two years) and then the second stage (which is the final stage and lasts for three years). This military order also included the conditions for admission to the college, academic departments, and duties of graduates.

In the same year, the Military College of Science was established in Abdel Rahim Sabry Palace in the Dokki area, and its name was changed to be the Military Technical College in accordance with the military order issued on September 7, 1959.

The college began qualifying faculty members in 1960, and cadres were sent to Czechoslovakia to obtain doctoral degrees in various engineering fields between 1964 and 1975. Other groups were also sent to several countries such as France, Britain, America, Canada, Soviet Union, and China since 1977.

In 1978, the Czech role ended and it began to rely entirely on Egyptian faculty members, carrying out the tasks of qualifying graduates and awarding master's and doctoral degrees, as well as specialized diplomas. Thousands of Egyptians and other expatriates from Arab and African countries have graduated from their hands.

== Founder ==
Mohamed Ibrahim Selim
- محمد سليم حسن
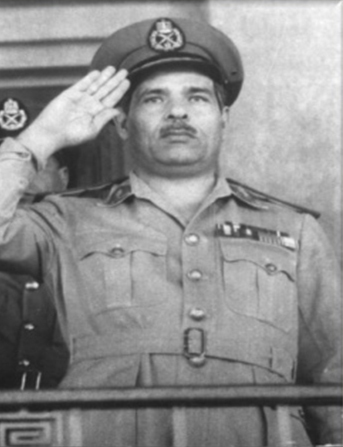

Director of the Military Technical College
- In office 27 October 1957 – 21 September 1971

Minister of Military Production
- In office 22 September 1971 – 27 October 1972
- Preceded by: Abdel Wahab el-Beshry
- Succeeded by: Ahmad Kamel el-Badry

Director of the Military Technical College
- In office 28 October 1972 – 13 February 1975

Personal details
- Born: 1916 (age 109–110) Cairo, Sultanate of Egypt
- Education: Alexandria University
- Occupation: Military officer
- Awards: Order of Merit – First Class; Military Prize for Science

Military service
- Allegiance: Egypt
- Branch/service: Egyptian Army
- Rank: Lieutenant General
- Commands: Chief of the General Staff; Military Technical College
- Battles/wars: 1947–1949 Palestine war 1949–1956 Palestinian exodus Suez Crisis; Six-Day War

The college was founded by Mohamed Ibrahim Selim.

Selim participated in the Palestine War in 1948, and in the Suez Crisis in 1956.

He was appointed founder and first director of the Military Technical College from 27 October 1957 until 21 September 1971. A presidential decree was issued appointing him Minister of State for Military Production from 09/22/1971 to 10/27/1972. He was appointed again as Director of the Military Technical College from 10/28/1972 until 02/13/1975.

Selim played a prominent role in the technical reconstruction of the armed forces after the Six-Day War in 1967. He was appointed a member of the Supreme Council of Sciences, chaired the Education Development Committee, a member of the national councils specialized in the field of education affairs, and a member of the Telecommunications Development Council. He participated in many technical researches to develop devices and equipment for the armed forces.
