= Hatata (disambiguation) =

Hatata (/hɑːˈtɑːtə/; Ge'ez: ሐተታ ḥätäta "inquiry") is a Ge'ez term describing an investigation and refers to two 17th-century ethical and rational philosophical treatises in Ethiopia.

Hatata may also refer to:

- Hatata, island located west of Ambon, Indonesia
- Magdy Hatata (born 1941), Egyptian military officer
- Sherif Hatata (1923–2017), Egyptian doctor, author and communist activist
