= Magdy Hatata =

Egyptian military officer (born 1941)

Lieutenant General Magdy Hatata
- Born: Magdy Anwar Hatata; 1941 (age 84–85)
- Alma mater: Egyptian Military School
- Military career
- Allegiance: Egypt
- Branch: Egyptian Army
- Rank: Lieutenant general
- Commands: Chief of the General Staff; Republican Guard
- Conflicts: Six-Day War; Yom Kippur War
- Other work: Chairperson of the Arab Organization for Industrialization

Magdy Hatata (born 1941) is an Egyptian former military officer who held various positions during the Presidency of Hosni Mubarak.

== Biography ==
Hatata was born in 1941. He received a master of arts degree in military science and a fellowship of the Nasser Military Academy’s Higher War College.

He served as the commander of the second field army. He also headed the Republican Guard, being the fifth commander of the guard under Mubarak. He was one of the military personnel who fought against Israel in 1973.

Hatata was promoted to the rank of lieutenant general. He was appointed chief of staff of the Egyptian Armed Forces on 31 October 1995, replacing Salah Halabi in the post. Hatata held the post until 31 October 2001 when Hamdy Wahiba was appointed to the post. The same year Hatata was named by President Hosni Mubarak as the head of Arab Organization for Industrialization. After leaving the office, Hatata taught at the Egyptian Army’s Command and General Staff College.

In 2011, he was reportedly expected to be one of the presidential candidates. However, he declared in December 2011 that he would not run for the office.
