= Hamdy Wahiba =

Egyptian military officer

- Education: Egyptian Military School
- Military career
- Allegiance: Egypt
- Branch: Egyptian Army
- Rank: Lieutenant general
- Commands: Chief of the General Staff; Republican Guard
- Conflicts: Six-Day War; Yom Kippur War
- Other work: Chairperson of the Arab Organization for Industrialization

Hamdy Wahiba (sometimes spelled as Hamdy Wheiba, Hamdy Wehieba or Hamdy El Wahiba), is a retired lieutenant general of the Egyptian Army. He served as the 17th chief of general staff in the Egyptian Armed Forces from 31 October 2001 to 29 October 2005. He also served as chairperson of the Arab Organization for Industrialization (AOI) from 2005 to 2012. Preceded by Magdy Hatata, Wahiba was previously appointed as commander of the Republican Guard in 1997. He was the sixth commander of the guard under Mubarak.

== Biography ==
Wahiba graduated from the Egyptian Military Academy in 1966, and subsequently joined infantry battalion, which participated in the Six-Day War. He also participated in the Yom Kippur War.
