= Alwan Hassoun =

Iraqi Air Force Major General (born 1944)

Major General Alwan Hassoon Alwan Al-Abousi
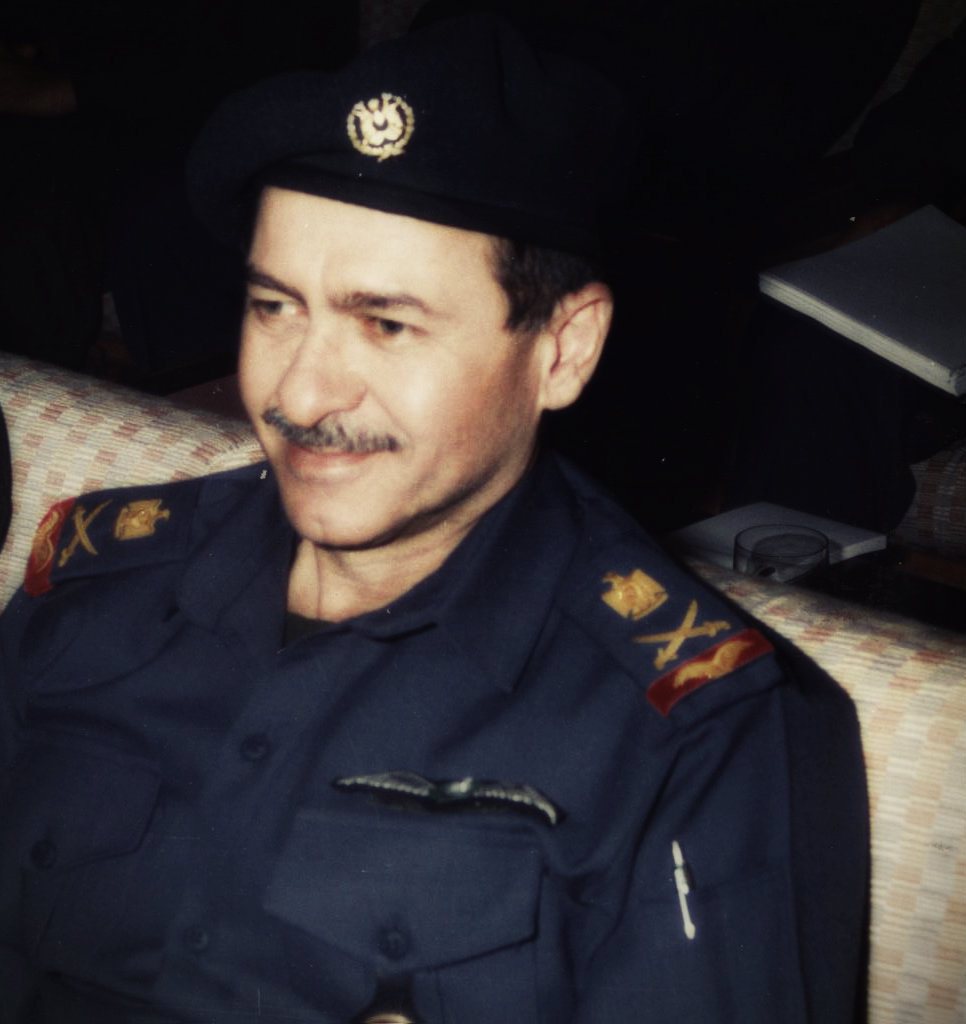
- Major General Alwan Al-Abousi
- Born: December 12, 1944; Basra
- Military career
- Allegiance: Iraq
- Branch: Iraqi Air Force
- Service years: 1965–2003
- Rank: Major General
- Nickname: Al-Abousi
- Commands: Director and deputy commander of Iraqi air force training early 1988–1989 and 1995–1996. Dean of the national defense for higher political and military studies 1989–1993. commander of air force administration 1993–1994. Wing commander of Sukhoi-22 Kirkuk Air Base 1978–1981; Base commander Kirkuk Air Base 1981–1983. Base commander Shaibah Air Base 1983–1984; Base commander Habbaniyah Air Base1985-1988; Veterans Service (strategic reserves) 1997.
- Other work: Lawyer

Alwan Hassoon Alwan Al-Abousi (born December 12, 1944) is a retired Iraqi Air Force major general. He was born in Basra, Iraq, and attended to join the Iraqi Air Force Academy in 1961 and was commissioned as a MiG-17 fighter pilot in 1965. He graduated with a BSc in aviation science from the Egyptian Air Force Academy in 1970. Subsequently, he received an MA in military science from the Iraqi Staff College at Bakr University. His foreign military training includes training in Egypt, India, Russia, France, and Greece. During the Iran–Iraq War, he served as commander of multiple squadrons, groups, and air bases. Late in the war, he became the director and deputy commander of air force training. In the early 1990s, General Abousi became the dean of the national defense for higher political and military studies, and later the commander of air force administration.

== Military biography ==
Major General Alwan Al-Abousi Almost participated in all the wars fought by the Iraqi Air Force, 1967 Six-Day War, Iraqi army movements in national security 1974–1975, the first Persian Gulf War September 1980 to August 1988, and the Gulf War 2 August 1990 – 17 January 1991) operation Desert Storm was a war waged by coalition forces from 34 nations led by the United States against Iraq in response to Iraq's invasion and annexation of Kuwait.

== Other work ==
He became a lawyer after he studied and graduated from Baghdad University, and author of books in the history of the Iraqi AF since its inception on April 22, 1931 until 2003 capabilities and strategic roles to the Iraqi Air Force, When we embrace the sky, Fighter pilot diary and others.

== Education ==
- 1970 Bachelor of Aviation Degree, Egyptian Air Force Academy.
- 1989 Master of Military Science (Iraqi Staff College) National Defense College.
- 1989 Fellow of the Egyptian Military Academy – Nasser Academy of Higher Military Studies Cairo.
- High National Defense Diploma from Al-Bakr University Centre for Military and Strategic Studies, Baghdad.
- Doctorate Degree Political Science – The Hague University – Netherlands.

== Assignments ==
- Basic aviation course in Egypt Bilbeis Air Base
- Flight information service in Baghdad
- Flight instructor courses in Baghdad
- Air combat formations leaders courses
- Air War ground common course in (India) JWS
- Ground formations commanders course Baghdad
- Iraqi Staff College course
- Higher War Academies course, Nasser Military Academy (Cairo)
- National Defense course at Al-Baker University, Strategic and Military Higher Studies
- Many developmental courses and specialist inside and outside Iraq (e.g., Russia, France, Greece, India)

== Flight information ==
- Rating: Command pilot.
- Flight hours: 3,400 hours as a fighter pilot.
- Aircraft flown: MiG-17, MiG-21, MiG-23, MiG-29, Sukhoi Su-7, Sukhoi Su-22, Mirage F1, SEPECAT Jaguar, Tupolev Tu-22

== Promotion dates ==
- First class Iraqi Air Force Medal
- First Class Golden Jubilee Medal of Iraqi Army
- Second class Al-Rafedain Decoration
- Medal of Courage x 4
- Medal of Higher Merit
- October War 1973
- Iraqi Victory Medal
- Iraqi army movements in national security
- Iraqi Cooperation Medal
- Civil Service Medal
- Medal for Revolution of 17 July 1968
