= Abd Al-Halim Abu-Ghazala =

Former Defense Minister of Egypt

Muhammad Abd Al-Halim Abu-Ghazala
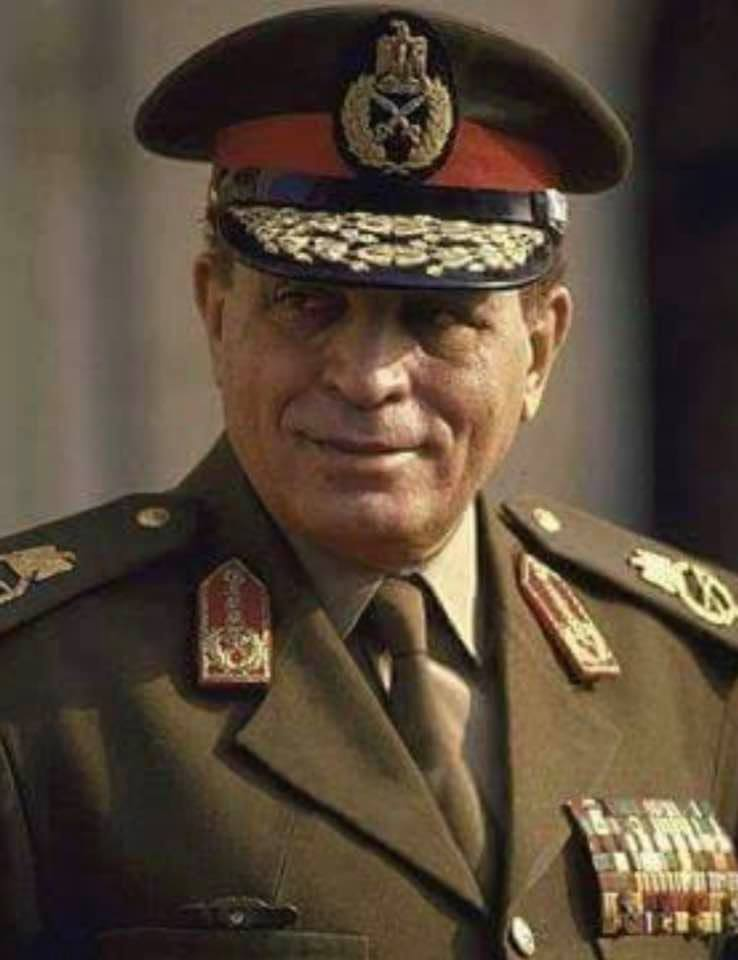
- Abu Ghazala in 1986

Minister of Defence of Egypt
- In office 4 March 1981 – 15 April 1989
- President: Anwar Sadat; Hosni Mubarak
- Prime Minister: Ahmad Fuad Mohieddin; Kamal Hassan Ali; Ali Mahmoud Lutfi; Atef Sedki
- Preceded by: Ahmed Badawi
- Succeeded by: Youssef Sabri Abu Taleb

Personal details
- Born: 15 January 1930 Zuhur Al Omara, El Delengat, Beheira, Egypt
- Died: 6 September 2008 (aged 78) Heliopolis, Cairo, Egypt
- Party: Independent

Military service
- Allegiance: Egypt
- Branch/service: Egyptian Army
- Years of service: 1949–1989
- Rank: Field Marshal
- Unit: Artillery
- Commands: Commander-in-Chief of the Armed Forces
- Battles/wars: Suez Crisis; War of Attrition; Yom Kippur War

Muhammad Abd Al-Halim Abu-Ghazala (Arabic: محمد عبد الحليم أبو غزالة; 15 January 1930 – 6 September 2008) was Defense Minister of Egypt from 1981 to 1989. Abu Ghazala was seated next to Anwar Sadat when the president was assassinated.

== Early life and education ==
He was born in Zuhur Al Omara village, El Delengat, Beheira Governorate, on 15 January 1930. His family descended from "Awlad Aly" tribe. After completing his secondary education, he joined the Egyptian Royal Military Academy, then he received the battalion command diploma from Stalin Academy in the Soviet Union in 1949. He also graduated from Nasser Academy for higher military education (Cairo 1961). On the civilian studies side, he received a bachelor's degree from the faculty of commerce, Cairo University. Abu Ghazala received the diploma of honor from the National War College in the U.S., thus being the first non-American to receive such an award.

Besides his native Arabic, Abu Ghazala was also fluent in English, French and Russian.

== Career ==
He was the Second Army's artillery commander during the October War of 1973. After the war he was appointed commander of the Artillery Corps.

Between 1976 and 1979, he served as his country’s military attaché to Washington, and it was during his sojourn there that he developed a close relationship with American officials and a reputation for being partial to the US There he was the first non-American military to receive a diploma of honor from the Command and General Staff College at Carlisle Barracks.

Upon returning to Cairo in 1979, Abu Ghazala was named director of military intelligence. He was appointed Chief of Staff of the Armed Forces on 15 May 1980, and he was promoted two days later.

When the Minister of Defense and military production, Ahmad Badawi, died along with 12 senior officers in a helicopter crash on 2 March 1981, Anwar Sadat appointed Abu Ghazala minister of defense and military production.

Shortly after Anwar Sadat was killed, he obtained the rank of Field Marshal in 1982.

He was also involved with Gust Avrakotos and Charlie Wilson in supplying weapons to the Afghan mujahideen during the Soviet–Afghan War. The CIA bought the weapons and passed them through Pakistan's ISI to the Afghan rebel groups. Items included .303 ammo for Lee–Enfield rifles, limpet mines, and urban terrorist devices like bicycle bombs. There were also a number of rockets that some believe was the Katyusha.

== Condor-II and removal ==
The Vector is a cancelled tripartite program between Egypt, Argentina, and Iraq to develop a two-stage solid and liquid propellant missile with a range of 800–5,000 kilometres (500–3,110 mi). This missile was called Vector in Egypt, Condor-II in Argentina, and Badr-2000 in Iraq.

To do this, Abu Ghazala established an office within Egypt's defense ministry called "Ballistic Missile Egypt" (BME), Argentina, with assistance from MBB worked through a consortium of many European missile suppliers called "Consen".

In 1989, erstwhile Egyptian president Hosni Mubarak removed him from office after diplomatic pressure that he was involved in smuggling carbon-carbon and other technologies relevant to strap-down inertial systems, which could've been used to protect the missile's re-entry vehicle during descent, from the United States, henceforth violating U.S. export laws. Abdelkader Helmy, an Egyptian-American propulsion expert with U.S security clearance, agreed to procure the technologies for Egypt. Finally, On 14 June 1988, approximately 430 pounds of carbon-carbon were shipped to an Ohio warehouse and readied for onward delivery to Baltimore. An Egyptian Air Force C-130 would depart Baltimore Washington International Airport on 24 June, 1988, and the carbon-carbon was destined to be put on the flight. Altogether, Colonel Hussam Khairat (a military attaché to Austria and a go-between who had liaison with Consen.), Helmy, his wife, and James Huffman (Helmy's procurement agent) were detained. Helmy was charged with money laundering and conspiracy. An American court had ordered a wiretap of Helmy's office a year earlier as evidence of his activities mounted.

Shortly after Mubarak's visit to the United States in early April 1989, for within days of his return to Cairo, Mubarak ousted Abu Ghazala from his post and appointed him to the position of personal advisor to the president.

== 2005 elections ==
In 2005, Abu Ghazala was briefly rumored to be a presidential candidate for the powerful but illegal Muslim Brotherhood. He finally did not run, and the Muslim Brotherhood did not field a candidate in the first contested Egyptian presidential elections. The Muslim Brotherhood offered him to run as their presidential candidate, but he refused due to their different advocacies.

Field Marshal Abu Ghazala wrote his first book titled "The Cannons Were Launched by Noon .. the Egyptian Artillery during the Ramadan War", in which he demonstrated the role of the Egyptian artillery corps during the October War and gleaned some information about his views and his military doctrine towards Israel.

== Death ==
Abu Ghazala died on 6 September 2008 at El-Galla Military Hospital in Heliopolis, Cairo at the age of 78, from throat cancer.
