= Mohammed Ahmed Sadek =

Egyptian military officer and minister of war (1917–1991)

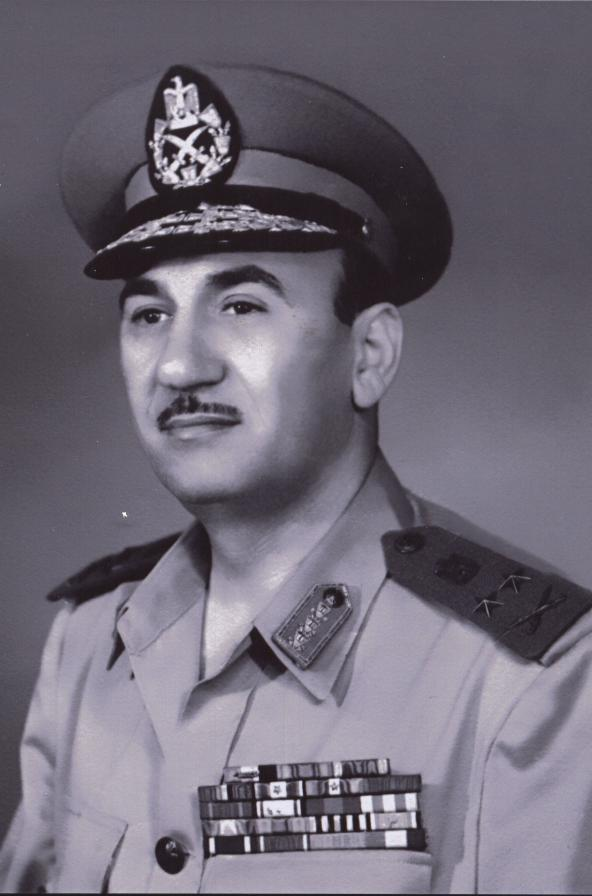

Minister of War
- In office 14 May 1971 – 26 October 1972
- President: Anwar Sadat
- Preceded by: Mohammed Fawzi
- Succeeded by: Ahmed Ismail Ali

Personal details
- Born: October 1917 Al Qatawiya, Sharqia Governorate, Sultanate of Egypt
- Died: 15 March 1991 (aged 73–74)
- Children: 2
- Education: Military academy; M. V. Frunze Military Academy (USSR)

Military service
- Allegiance: Egypt
- Branch/service: Egyptian Army
- Years of service: 1937–1972
- Rank: General
- Unit: 7th Infantry Regiment
- Battles/wars: Palestine war; Suez campaign; Six Day War; War of Attrition

Mohammed Ahmed Sadek (Arabic: محمد أحمد صادق; October 1917 – 15 March 1991) was an Egyptian colonel general who served as defense minister under the rule of President Anwar Sadat.

== Early life and education ==
Sadek was born in Al Qatawiya, a village in the Sharqia Governorate, in October 1917. He graduated from the Egypt's military academy in 1938 and from M. V. Frunze Military Academy in the Soviet Union.

== Career and activities ==
Sadek joined the army and started his military career in the royal guard. He took part in the Palestine war in 1948 and the Suez Campaign in 1956. From 1962 to 1964 he was military attaché at the Egypt's embassy in Bonn. Then he was made the curricula director of the military academy in 1965 where he served until 1967. He was the head of military intelligence from June 1967 to 1969. In September 1969, he briefly acted as the general secretary of the Pan Arab Organization, being in charge of military affairs. He was also named as the Chief of the General Staff by President Gamal Abdel Nasser in September 1969. In 1970, Sadek was promoted to the rank of lieutenant general.

Sadek was appointed minister of war by Anwar Sadat on 14 May 1971 after the resignation of Mohammed Fawzi. Upon his appointment, he was promoted to full general. When Sadek was in office, he also held the job of armed forces commander in chief. Sadek was dismissed from office on 26 October 1972, and was put under house arrest.

Sadek's anti-Soviet approach was cited as the reason for his dismissal. Another reason given for Sadek's dismissal was his criticisms over Anwar Sadat's approach concerning the war with Israel. Sadek was replaced by Ahmed Ismail Ali as defense minister in October 1972.

== Personal life and death ==
Sadek was married and had two sons. He died on 15 March 1991.
