= Mahmoud Shokry =

Mahmoud Shokry (Arabic: محمود شكري, Maḥmood Shukrī, also transliterated as Mahmoud Shoukry or Mahmoud Shukri), was a chief of staff of the Egyptian Army with the rank of Fariq (Lt. General). He was appointed by King Farouk after the signing of the Anglo-Egyptian Treaty of 1936 which led to the withdrawal of British forces from Egypt. He has a street in the heart of Cairo named after him.
