= Egyptian Naval College =

College of the Egyptian Military Academy

- Type: military college
- Established: October 1946
- Location: Abu Qir

The Egyptian Naval College (Arabic: الكلية البحرية), one of the colleges of the Egyptian Military Academy, is a military college set up to supply the navy with professional officers. It was established in October 1946. Graduates of the Egyptian Naval Academy are commissioned as officers in the Egyptian Navy.

== Historical background ==
The College was established at Ras El-Teen in October 1946, when the first group of 50 cadets was admitted. This group joined the military academy for six months to receive primary military training, then completed their studies for two years in the Naval Academy. The college moved to its current location in the Abu Qir, Alexandria neighborhood in 1965, and the duration of study became four years, with the application of specialization in maritime navigation, missiles, artillery, underwater weapons, marine signal and coastal artillery. Ten cohorts graduated according to this system.

From 1959 to 1972, when the Arab Academy was established, the college started to qualify cadets from African and Arab countries to serve as naval officers and engineers in the naval commercial fleet. In 1975, the system of study was amended to become specialized in (maritime navigation, missiles, artillery, underwater weapons, marine signal or coastal artillery) after graduation from college.

In 1988, a program of co-operation between the Egyptian Naval college and the United States Naval Academy in Annapolis started to develop methodology and provide educational labs and model educational aids. Means of entertainment were also improved in a bid to keep up with the best naval colleges from all over the world, a huge boost was given for the development of the Egyptian Naval College, where the latest American educational systems, simulators and scientific models were implemented, specialized laboratories and training assistance were provided.

After more than half a century, graduates from different countries began to assume command in different navies, which has helped to maintain good and strong relations between Egypt and other countries.

== Appointment process ==
=== Admissions requirements ===
Admission to the Naval College is carried out through the Coordination Office of the Military Colleges with the same entry tests stages. The applicant requesting to join the Naval College should have a minimum of 60% in high school diploma.

== Academics ==
The duration of study is for four years, during which the student studies:

- General Military Sciences
- Specialized Maritime Sciences
- Basic Engineering
- Basics of Physics
- Basics of Chemistry
- Language
- Administrative and Human Sciences

The graduate is awarded a bachelor's degree in Maritime Studies (a bachelor's degree in Maritime studies is equivalent to a second mate certificate). The graduate can continue military or civilian studies, whether in military or civilian universities (masters and PHD).

The graduation certificate entitles graduates for:

- Command of small ships.
- Obtain a two-star diving License.
- Serving as an officer at port and sea.
- Shipping insurance for all types of ships.
