= Abdul Munim Khaleel =

Egyptian general (1921–2022)

Lieutenant general Abdul Munim Khaleel
- عبد المنعم خليل
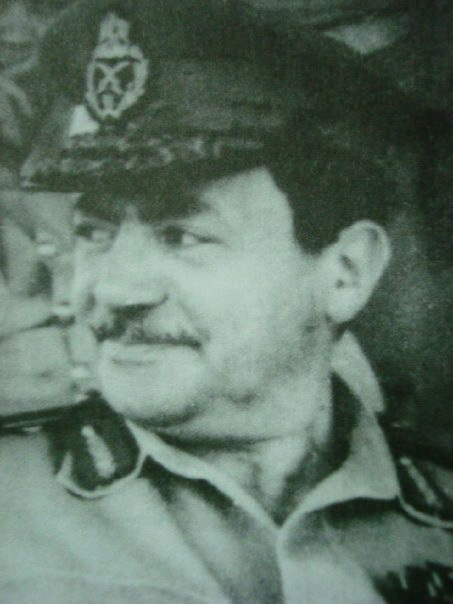
- Born: 1 April 1921; Minya Governorate, Sultanate of Egypt
- Died: 23 March 2022 (aged 100); Cairo, Egypt
- Military career
- Allegiance: Egypt
- Branch: Egyptian Army
- Service years: 1942–1975
- Rank: Lieutenant General
- Commands: 2nd Army
- Conflicts: 1948 Arab-Israeli War; Suez Crisis; North Yemen Civil War; Six-Day War; Yom Kippur War

Abdul Munim Khaleel (Arabic: عبد المنعم خليل; 1 April 1921 – 23 March 2022) was an Egyptian military officer who commanded the Egyptian 2nd Army during the Yom Kippur War.

Khaleel was born in 1921, and graduated from the Egyptian Military Academy in 1942. He assumed command of the Egyptian 2nd Army during the Yom Kippur War, replacing Major General Saad Mamoun. He later apparently commanded the Central Military Region. He became a centenarian in April 2021 when he turned a 100, and died on March 23, 2022, at age 100.

== Military career ==
- He graduated from the Military College in May 1942
- Participated in the 1948 Palestine War, the 1956 Triple Aggression, the Yemen War 1962–1967, the 1967 War, the War of Attrition, the October 1973 War.
- Chief of Staff, Fourth Brigade, infantry
- Head of operations for Arab forces in Yemen
- Commander of the Egyptian Parachute Corps 1967
- Chief of Staff, Second Infantry Division
- Commander of the 3rd Infantry Division after the 1967 war
- Chief of Staff of the Second Army
- Commander of the Second Field Army until 1972
- Head of the Armed Forces Training Authority
- Commander of the military central region during the October war until October 16
- The commander of the second army on October 16, 1973, the period of the breach
- Assistant Minister of War and Commander of Popular and Military Defense
- Assistant Minister of War and Chairman of the Armed Forces Training Authority

== See also ==
- Abdel Moneim Saeed
