= Mohamed Fawzi (general) =

Egyptian military officer (1915–2000)

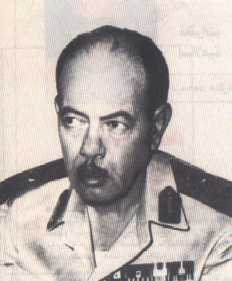

Minister of War
- In office 24 February 1968 – 14 May 1971
- President: Gamal Abdel Nasser; Anwar Sadat
- Preceded by: Amin Howeidi
- Succeeded by: Mohammed Sadek

Personal details
- Born: 5 March 1915 Abbasiya, Cairo, Sultanate of Egypt
- Died: 16 February 2000 (aged 84) Heliopolis, Cairo, Egypt
- Education: Military academy

Military service
- Allegiance: Egypt
- Branch/service: Egyptian Army
- Rank: Colonel General
- Battles/wars: 1948 Arab–Israeli War; Six-Day War

Mohamed Fawzi (Arabic: محمد فوزي; 5 March 1915 – 16 February 2000) was an Egyptian general and politician who served as minister of war between 1968 and 1971.

== Early life and education ==
Fawzi was born in Abbasiya, Cairo, on 5 March 1915. He attended the Egyptian Royal Military Academy and graduated in 1936. He also held a master's degree, which he received from the same institution in 1952.

== Career ==
During the 1948 Arab–Israeli War, Fawzi first met Gamal Abdel Nasser and served as the commander of anti-aircraft artillery in Deir Suneid. In 1957, Fawzi was appointed by President Nasser as commander of the Military Academy. In 1961, Fawzi headed the Egypt's military mission as part of the UN forces in Congo. He became military secretary-general of the Arab League in March 1964. The same month, he was also made Nasser's chief of staff, a post he occupied until the Six-Day War in June 1967.

After the war, Fawzi resigned from his office and was replaced by Abdel Moneim Reiad in the post. On 11 June 1967 Fawzi was appointed general commander, replacing Abdel Hakim Amer in the post. Amer and his allies protested the move and immediately afterward, 600 officers loyal to Amer besieged army headquarters demanding Amer's reinstatement and threatening to oust Fawzi. Amer was plotting to launch a coup on 27 August, and tension mounted between him and Nasser. Amer was invited to the president's home, and was apprehended there. Meanwhile, Fawzi led an army takeover of Amer's villa, where all thirteen truckloads of the plotters' weapons were seized.

Fawzi was appointed minister of war on 24 February 1968, succeeding Amin Howeidi in the post. He also became one of the members of the Supreme Executive Committee of Egypt the same year. Fawzi continued to serve as minister of war during the presidency of Anwar Sadat. However, Fawzi and six other ministers resigned from office in May 1971. These individuals who were close to Nasser were called the May Group. Mohammed Sadek replaced Fawzi as minister of war from 14 May 1971.

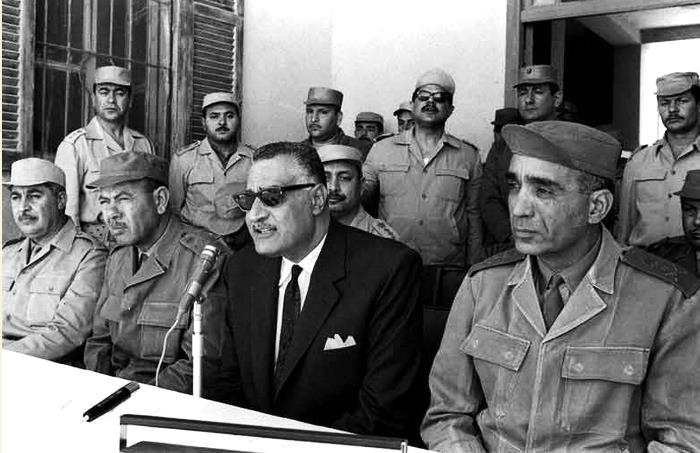
Fawzi (second from left) with President Gamal Abdel Nasser (second from right) and Chief of Staff Abdul Munim Riad (seated first from right) at Suez Canal front during the War of Attrition with Israel, February 1968

=== Arrest and sentence ===
Immediately after his resignation, Fawzi was arrested due to his alleged role in a coup plot. Sadat announced that Fawzi had been placed under house arrest in May 1971. Fawzi was tried and sentenced to life imprisonment. In December 1971, Sadat reduced Fawzi's sentence to 15 years of hard labor. Fawzi received a pardon in 1974, due to concerns about his health and in recognition of his military service.

== Later years and death ==
In his later years, Fawzi published books on military affairs and gave lectures. He also published a biography. He joined Arab Democratic Nasserist Party, being a member of its political bureau.

Fawzi died on 16 February 2000 in Heliopolis in Cairo.

== Bibliography ==
- Risa Brooks (2008), Shaping Strategy: The Civil-military Politics of Strategic Assessment, Princeton, NJ: Princeton University Press, ISBN 978-0-691-12980-8
- Hazem Kandil (2012), Soldiers, Spies and Statesmen: Egypt's Road to Revolt, London: Verso Books, ISBN 978-1-84467-962-1
