= Mohamed Ibrahim Selim =

First chief of the general staff of Egypt

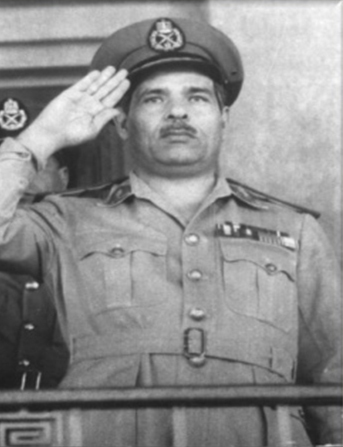
- Mohamed Ibrahim Selim in 1966
- Born: Mohamed Ibrahim Hassan Selim; 1916; Cairo, Egypt
- Alma mater: Alexandria University
- Military career
- Allegiance: Egypt
- Branch: Egyptian Army
- Rank: Lieutenant general
- Commands: Military Technical College
- Conflicts: 1947–1949 Palestine war; 1949–1956 Palestinian exodus; Six-Day War
- Awards: Order of Merit

Mohamed Ibrahim Hassan Selim (Arabic: محمد إبراهيم حسن سليم) was a lieutenant general in the Egyptian Armed Forces who served in the minister of Military Production from 1971 to 1972, and the first commander of Military Technical College from 1957 to 1971. He was also the founder of that college.

== Biography ==
Selim was born in 1916 in Cairo, Egypt. He obtained B.Sc. in electrical engineering from Cairo University in 1938, M.Sc. in electrical engineering from Alexandria University in 1958, and later he obtained his PhD in the same engineering discipline from Alexandria university in 1962.

Selim participated in the 1947–1949 Palestine war and the 1949–1956 Palestinian exodus. He also provided technical support to the Egyptian Army during the Six-Day War, and later conducted technical researches to develop uncertain equipment for the Egyptian Army.

His other staff appointments included; one of the members of the High Science Council, member of National Education Affairs and in addition to serving as a member of Development of Wired and Wireless Communications Council.

== Awards and decorations ==
Selim was awarded the Order of Merit – first class, and Military Prize for Science 1993 by the government of Egypt.
