= Fayed, Egypt =

Fayed فايد
- City
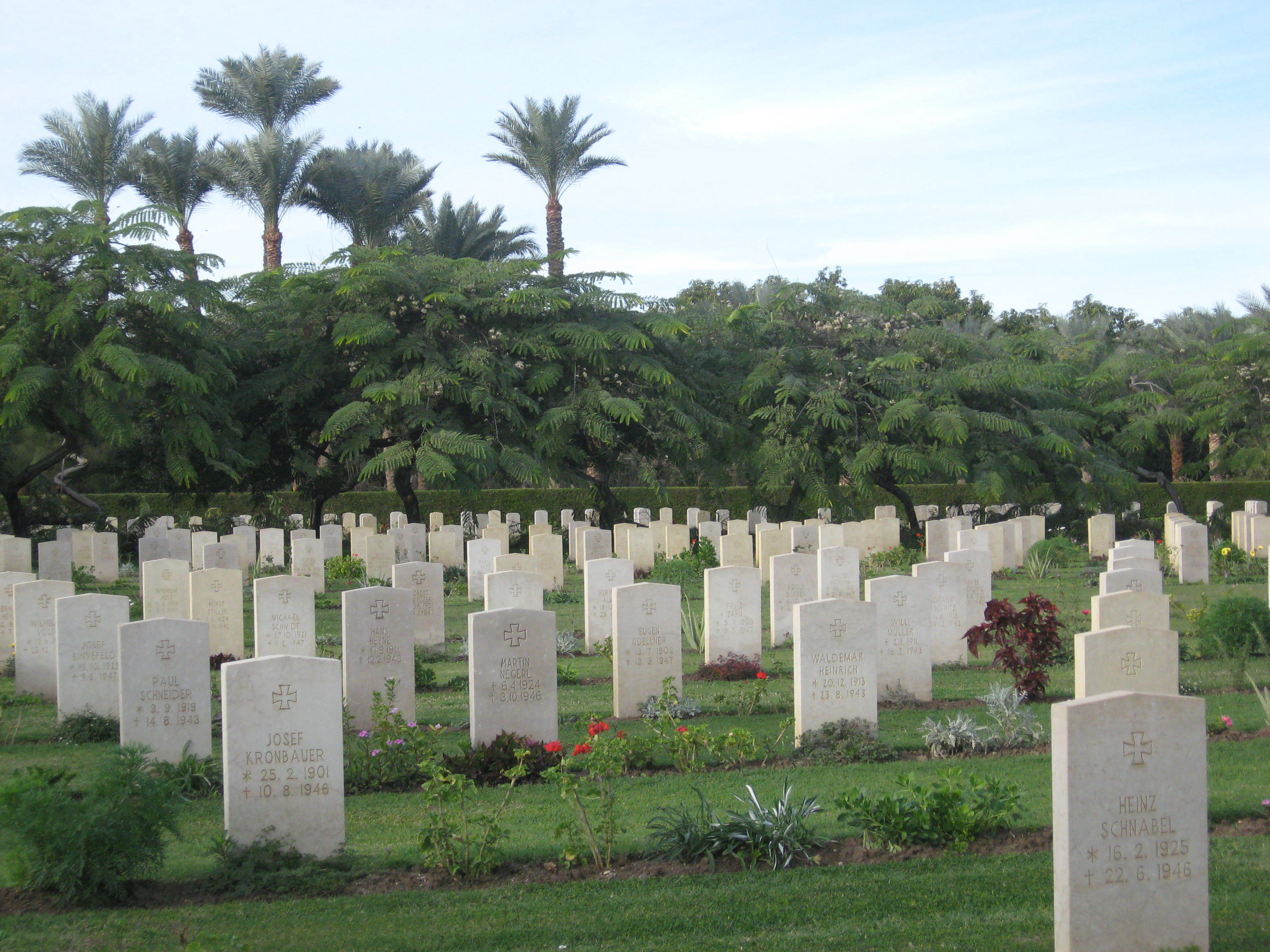
- British military cemetery in Fayed

- Location in Egypt
- Coordinates: 30.326111°N 32.298611°E
- Country: Egypt
- Governorate: Ismailia

Population (2018)
  - Total: 32,450
- Time zone: UTC+2 (EET)
  - Summer (DST): UTC+3 (EEST)

Fayed (Arabic: فايد) is a city in the Ismailia Governorate, Egypt. Its population was estimated at 32,500 people in 2018. The town is located about 20 kilometers south of Ismailia on the western shore of the Great Bitter Lake. It is located about halfway along the Suez Canal.

Originally, Fayed was mainly a fishing village; fish from the Bitter Lakes is particularly sought after in Egypt because of its quality and is correspondingly expensive. Agriculture on a larger scale has only returned since the historic Ismailia Canal was dredged and flooded in the course of the construction of the Suez Canal.

During World War II, several camps for German prisoners of war, members of the German Afrika Korps and units deployed in Italy and Greece, and interned German citizens were located in and around Fayed. The camps were each occupied by up to 15,000 people and known for their bad conditions.

== Fayed War Cemetery ==
Since June 1941, Fayed has been home to a British military cemetery with some 1800 graves for the dead of the garrisons stationed there as well as the German prisoners of the camps. The cemetery is maintained by the Commonwealth War Graves Commission. Among those buried there is former Scotland international footballer Alex Jackson (died 1946, buried as Major A.S. Jackson).
