= Ahmad Ismail Ali =

Egyptian military commander (1917-1974)

- أحمد إسماعيل علي
- Ahmed Ismail Ali in February 1974

Minister of Defence of Egypt
- In office 1972–1974
- President: Anwar El-Sadat
- Preceded by: Mohammed Ahmed Sadek
- Succeeded by: Abdel Ghani el-Gamasy

Director of the Egyptian General Intelligence Directorate
- In office 1971–1972
- President: Muhammad Naguib, Gamal Abdel Nasser
- Preceded by: Ahmad Kamel
- Succeeded by: Karim El-Leithy

Personal details
- Born: 14 October 1917 Cairo, Sultanate of Egypt
- Died: 25 December 1974 (aged 57) London, United Kingdom

Military service
- Allegiance: Kingdom of Egypt; United Arab Republic; Egypt
- Branch/service: Egyptian Army
- Years of service: 1938–1974
- Rank: Field Marshal
- Unit: 16th Infantry
- Commands: Commander-in-Chief of the Armed Forces
- Battles/wars: Second World War; North African campaign; Western Desert campaign; 1948 Arab–Israeli War; Suez Crisis; Six-Day War; Yom Kippur War; Operation Badr; Battle of the Sinai

Field Marshal Ahmad Ismail Ali (Arabic: أحمد إسماعيل علي; 14 October 1917 – 25 December 1974) was an Egyptian senior military officer who was Egypt's minister of war during the October War of 1973. He is best known for his planning of the attack across the Suez Canal, code-named Operation Badr.

He graduated from the Military Academy in 1938 and was a colleague of both the late President Anwar Sadat and President Gamal Abdel Nasser in the Academy. After graduating with the rank of second lieutenant, he joined the infantry and served in the Second World War and fought in the First Arab-Israeli War, the 1956 Suez Crisis and the Six-Day War. In 1969, he became the Chief of Staff of the Egyptian Armed Forces and then was dismissed by Nasser because of the famous Zafarana incident. Then under President Sadat returned him to the service as head of the General Intelligence, then he was promoted to the rank of Lieutenant-General and became Minister of War in 1972.

== Military career ==
- Graduated from Egypt's Royal Military Academy in 1938.
- Commissioned in an Infantry regiment.
- Served with the Allies in the Western Desert against the Axis during the Second World War
- Fought as an infantry battalion commander in the 1948 Arab-Israeli War.
- Later received training in Great Britain
- Saw active service during the 1956 Suez Crisis, and undertook further training in the Soviet Union
- Served as a division commander during the 1967 Six-Day War of 1967
- Head, Military Operations Authority
- Appointed Chief of the General Staff in March 1969, but was dismissed by President Nasser in September 1969 following successful Israeli raids during the War of Attrition. Nasser's successor as President, Anwar Al-Sadat, however, named him chief of intelligence in September 1970.
- From 1971 to 1972 he served as head of the Egyptian General Intelligence Directorate.

He graduated in 1938 with the rank of second lieutenant and joined the infantry. Then he went on the training mission to Deir Safir in Palestine in 1945, and he ranked first among the Egyptian and English officers. His talent began to shine in the Second World War, in which he participated as an intelligence officer in the Western Sahara. In the Palestine war, he became the commander of an infantry company in Rafah and Gaza, and that experience qualified him to be the first to establish the nucleus of the Sa’ika Forces. He was at the rank of (Colonel) and commanded the 3rd Infantry Brigade in Rafah and then Qantara Sharq during the tripartite aggression carried out by Britain, France and Israel against Egypt in the fall of 1956.

In 1957, he went to military academy in the Soviet Union, and in the same year he worked as a senior teacher at the Military academy in Egypt, after which he left it and took command of the 2nd Infantry Division, which he reconstituted to be the first combatant formation in the Egyptian Armed Forces.

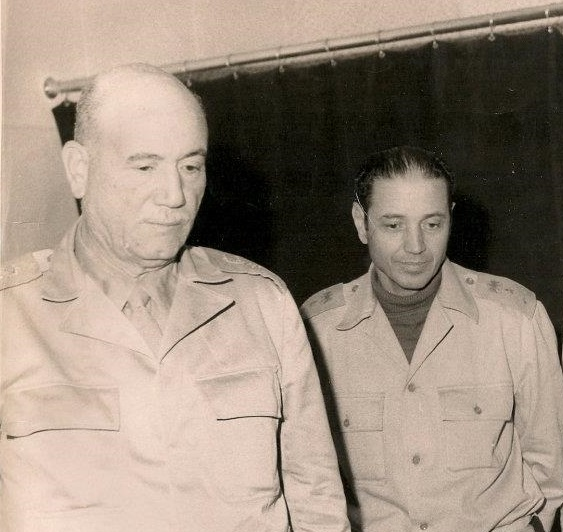
Lieutenant-General Shazly with Field Marshal Ahmed Ismail

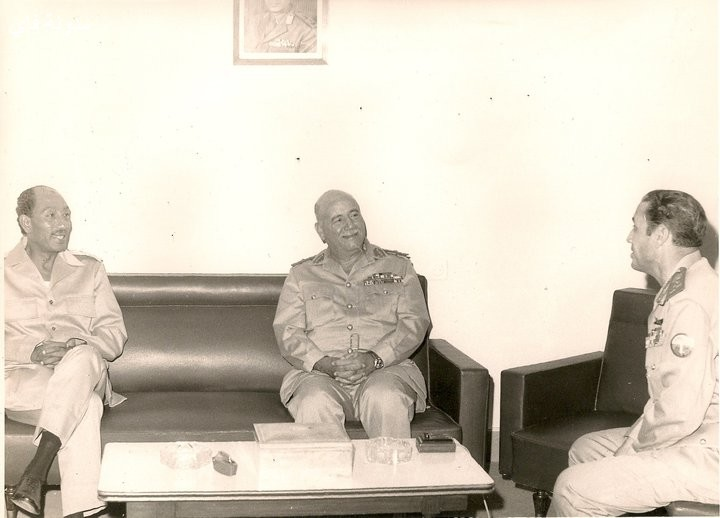
Lieutenant-General Shazly with Field Marshal Ahmed Ismail and President Sadat, 1973

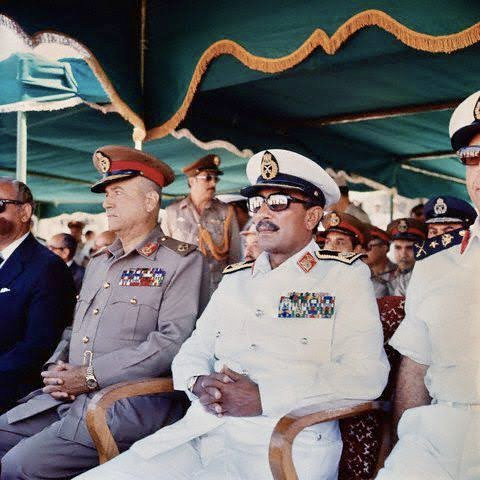
Ahmed Ismail Ali with President Anwar Sadat in the re-opening of Suez Canal, June 5, 1974

In 1960, the old centers of power tried to overthrow him, and he was at the rank of (brigadier) and after 1967, those centers found a justification to overthrow him, and indeed they succeeded in that, but President (Gamal Abdel Nasser) summoned him and handed him the command of the forces east of the Suez Canal, and only three months after The 1967 battles he established the first defensive line and reorganized, trained and armed these forces, and after a short period these forces were able to fight the battle of Ras al-Esh, the Battle of Green Island, and the sinking of the Israeli destroyer (Eilat). In October 1972, Ali accompanied Prime Minister Aziz Sidqi on a visit to Moscow, and, on his return, stifled a coup attempt against President Sadat. That same month, he replaced the anti-Soviet general Mohammed Ahmed Sadek as Minister of Defence, and was promoted to full general. His skill as a strategist, and his success in reviving the morale of the Egyptian army became evident in the October War of 1973. Following the war, he was made a Field Marshal in November 1973.

== Death ==
Ali died from advanced cancer in December 1974 in London, aged 57.

== Cultural depictions ==
=== Television ===
- Ahmed Ismail Ali was portrayed by Egyptian actor Salah Zulfikar in the 1993 television series The Fox (Al-Tha'lab) which aired on Egyptian television in Egypt and the Arab world.

== See also ==
- Saad el-Shazly
- Abdul Munim Khaleel
