= Mohamed Abdel Ghani el-Gamasy =

Egyptian Field Marshal

- محمد عبد الغني الجمسي
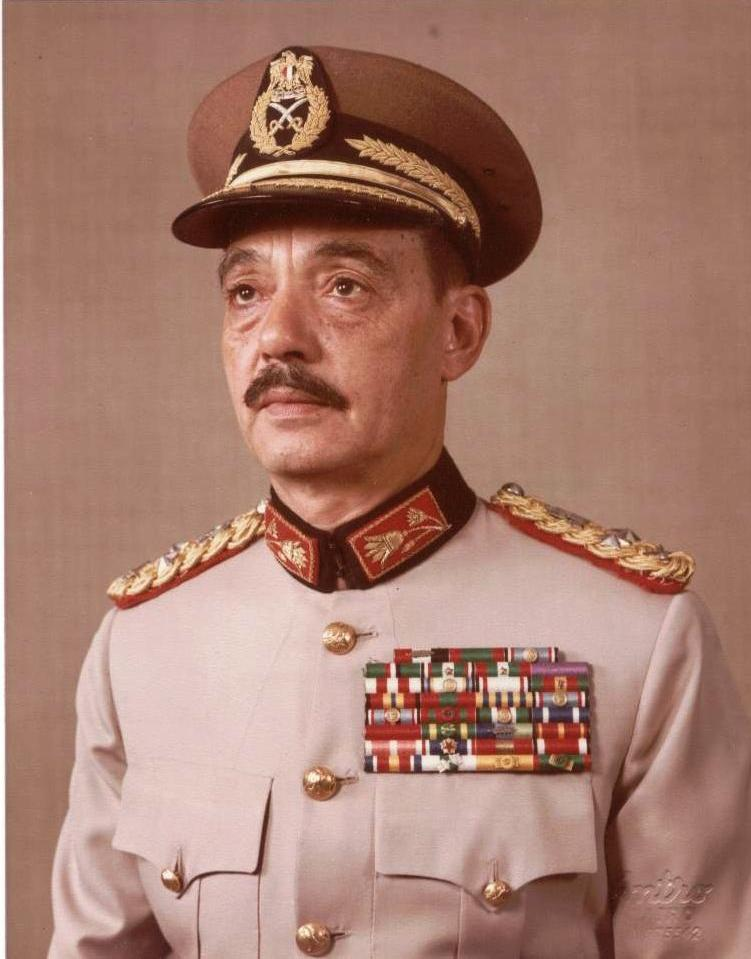
- Field Marshal Mohamed Abdel Ghani el-Gamasy, Minister of Defence and Military Production, c.1977

Minister of Defence of Egypt
- In office 1974–1978
- President: Anwar Sadat
- Prime Minister: Abd El Aziz Muhammad Hegazi; Mamdouh Salem
- Preceded by: Ahmad Ismail Ali
- Succeeded by: Kamal Hassan Ali

Personal details
- Born: 9 September 1921 Batanoon, Monufia Governorate, Sultanate of Egypt
- Died: 7 June 2003 (aged 81) Cairo, Egypt
- Awards: 24 Order, Medal and Ribbon from Egypt and other countries

Military service
- Allegiance: Kingdom of Egypt (1941-53); Republic of Egypt (1953-58); United Arab Republic (1958-71); Egypt (1971-78)
- Branch/service: Egyptian Army
- Years of service: 1941–1978
- Rank: Field Marshal
- Unit: 1st Cavalry
- Commands: Commander-in-Chief of the Armed Forces; Chief of Military Operations; Second Field Army; 14th Infantry Division
- Battles/wars: World War II; 1948 Arab-Israeli War; Suez Crisis; Six-Day War; Yom Kippur War; Egyptian-Libyan War

Mohamed Abdel Ghani el-Gamasy (Arabic: محمد عبد الغني الجمسي, 9 September 1921 – 7 June 2003) was an Egyptian Field Marshal and the former minister of defense of Egypt. He is considered one of the architects of the Yom Kippur War.

== Early life ==
El Gamasy was born on 9 September 1921 in Batanoon, Monufia Governorate, Egypt. He was one of two brothers and five sisters. After high school, El Gamassy joined the Egyptian Military Academy and was commissioned in 1941 as a reconnaissance officer in the Cavalry (1st Cavalry Regiment) As a Major, he was GSO-II of a cavalry battalion during the 1948 War.

== October War ==
During the War of Attrition, in March 1969, then-President Gamal Abdel Nasser appointed el-Gamasy as commander of the Second Field Army. His appointment was part of a process of rooting out former general commander Abdel Hakim Amer's mostly incompetent loyalists with capable commanders, including Abdul Munim Riad, Saad el-Shazly and Ahmed Ismail. El-Gamasy later wrote that Nasser should have deconstructed Amer's autonomous web of control in the armed forces following the Egyptian military failure during the Suez Crisis in 1956.

El-Gamasy was well known for being the Chief of Operations for all Ground Forces participating in the 1973 October War. He was also appointed by Anwar Sadat as the head of the group that participated in the disengagement talks on 28 October, at "Kilometer 101". Reportedly, he was sad for the lost souls at the war when the American secretary of state Henry Kissinger announced that the president Sadat agreed to pull the main part of the Egyptian forces from the east side of the Suez Canal in exchange of the withdrawal of Israeli forces from the west side of the Suez Canal and retreat back into the depth of Sinai.

== Death ==
On 7 June 2003, El Gamasy died in a hospital in Cairo after a long battle with illness.

== Honors ==
- Honor Military Star.
- 1952 Liberation decoration.
- 1958 United Republic decoration.
- (Somalia) Order of the Somali Star (First Class)

== Works ==
- The October War (Cairo, 1993)
