= Artillery Corps (Egypt) =

Military unit of the Egyptian Army

Egyptian Artillery Corps
- سلاح المدفعية المصرية
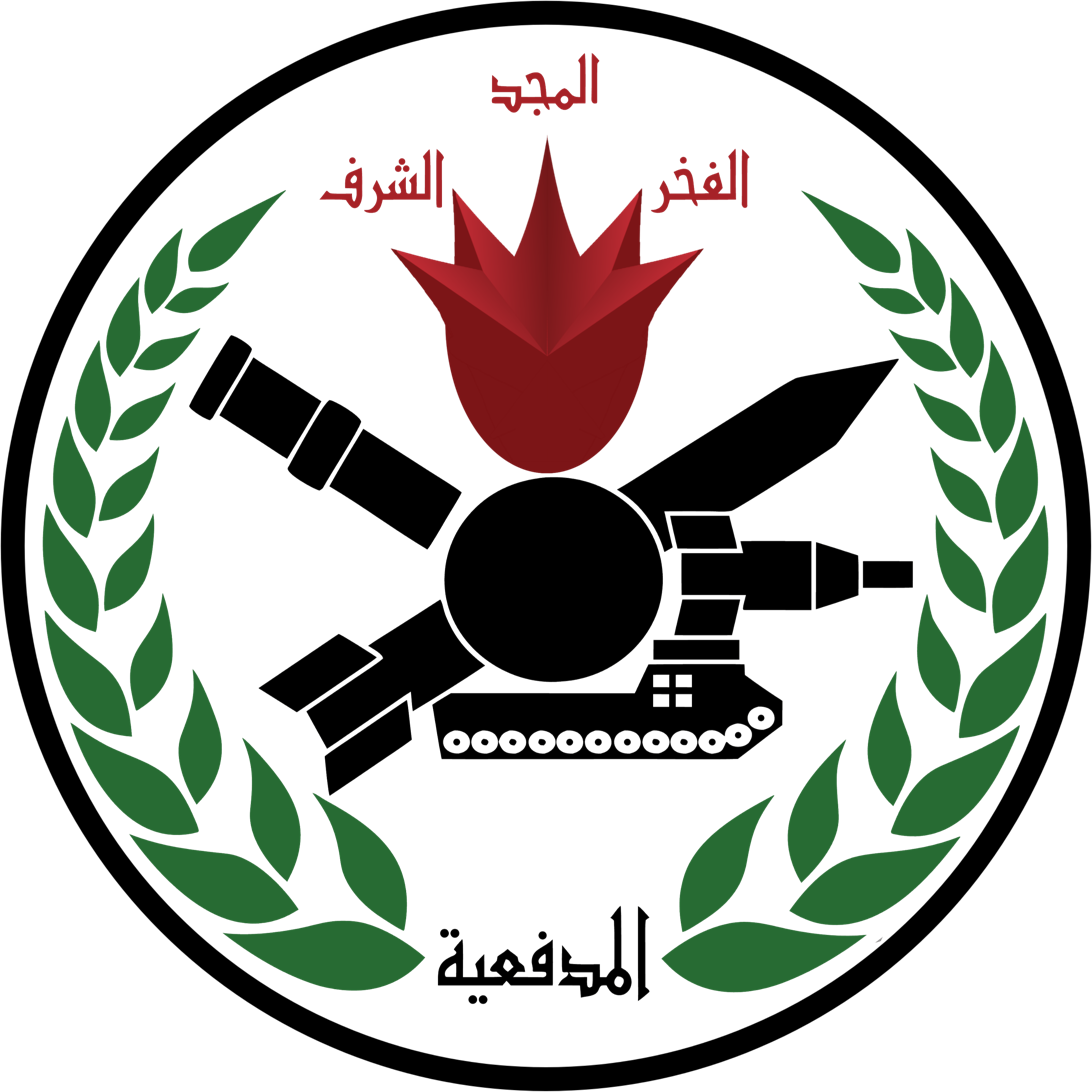
- Official Emblem
- Active: 1824 - present
- Allegiance: Egypt
- Branch: Egyptian Army
- Role: Artillery
- Garrison/HQ: Abbassia, Cairo
- Mottos: Valor, Pride, Honor

Commanders
- Current commander: Major General Ashraf Faris
- Notable commanders: Major General Abd Al-Halim Abu-Ghazala; Major General Muhammad Saeed El Mahi

The Egyptian Artillery Corps is one of the oldest branches of the Egyptian Army, formed in the early 19th century. Its most notable action was during Operation Badr in the Yom Kippur War. The Artillery Corps is responsible for unit support and more general, echelons-above-division fire support.

During Operation Badr in 1973, artillery strikes starting at 14:05 of nearly 2,000 pieces against the Bar-Lev line fortifications, and against armor concentration areas and artillery positions, using field guns, howitzers, mortars, tank guns, B-10 and B-11 recoilless rifles. The self-propelled 152 mm howitzers and 130 mm field guns were assigned counter-battery fire missions against Israeli artillery. The 53-minute-long fire preparation, one of the largest in history, was divided into four barrages. The first, fifteen minutes long, was aimed at enemy targets on the eastern bank up to a depth of 1.5 kilometers. An estimated 10,500 shells were fired against Israeli targets in the first minute alone.

== Foundation ==
As Muhammad Ali Pasha formed his modern Egyptian Army in 1820, he went on forming its branches and he truly knew that one of the most important success factors of any modern army was the artillery therefore he formed the Artillery Corps in 1824.

=== Artillery school in Tora ===
The regular artillery was formed at the time when the infantry was organized in a modern style, and a group of French officers organized and organized by the Egyptians, and in the forefront of which was the able officer Adham Bey (later Pasha) who founded the citadel's arsenal and took over the administration of military missions and then headed the Schools Bureau (Ministry of Education). Generality).

A military school for topagiya (artillery) was established in Tora, which was run by a Spanish officer named Colonel (Qaimmaqam) Don Antonio de Segara, who was offered to Muhammad Ali to construct it to graduate artillery officers to the Egyptian army, and his project was also presented to Ibrahim Pasha, commander of the army, and he won his support, and then the Artillery school was established based on the terms proposed by the Colonel Sigira, and the scholar Ali Mubarak mentioned this school in his words about Tora, so he said: "The head of the school of Al-Tobagiya, which is a great school from the foundations of Muhammad Ali, raised a group of officers who excelled in the arts of topology." Then he transferred what It was written by the Duke de Ragoz (Marshal Marmon) on of which will be remembered in place.

Three hundred graduates of Qasr Al-Ayny Preparatory School were chosen for this school, in which they received military lessons, Arabic and Turkish languages, arithmetic, algebra, engineering, mechanics, drawing, and rulings.

=== Artillery factories in the Citadel ===
The most important and most working arsenal plant was the first to draw attention by the artillery casting factory. Every month, three or four caliber cannons are made in it, and eight pounds. Sometimes, eight-inch mortars and 24-inch cannons are made in it.

The workers of this arsenal are not less than 1500 workers and each month they consume a large amount of coal and iron.

=== Gunpowder and ammunitions factory ===
As for the gunpowder and bomb stores, Muhammad Ali prepared a special place for them at the foot of the Muqattam.

=== Adham Pasha, first commander of the Artillery Corps ===
The people progressed that Adham Bey (later Pasha) was at the forefront of the competent officers who promoted the Egyptian artillery, and that he took over the management of military missions, and established the castle's armory industry to manufacture weapons and pour artillery.

And Adham, this is from the men of Muhammad Ali Pasha and who exerted their efforts in establishing the regular army, and he also who carried the banner of the renaissance of education in Egypt.

The scholar Ali Pasha Mubarak mentioned it, and he said about him: "He was one of the most famous men of the government who was sincere in carrying out his duties with diligence."

On his translation, he mentioned his summary that his origin came from Astana and then settled in Egypt during the era of Muhammad Ali Pasha when he composed the regular army, so he made him an officer in the artillery, and he was familiar with French, Arabic, Turkish and military formations, and organizing the missions, and Muhammad Ali Pasha made him a viewer of the military missions, so he made his effort in it. And praise Massa'idin and established this job for a time and then rose to the rank of admiralty, and he was receiving engineering from him a group of government men such as Ibrahim Bey Raafat, Undersecretary of the Schools Bureau, Mustafa Rasim, an engineering teacher at Al-Qasr Al-Aini School, and Hassan Effendi Al-Ghouri, an engineering teacher at the Artillery School of Tora.

One of his envy in 1249 AH was denounced against him and he was tempted by the issuance of his superiors, so he was separated from his job, and a case was brought to him that lasted for about eight months and his innocence emerged from it.

Ali Pasha Mubarak said in this regard: "The teachers at the workshops came to him in his home and asked him about work in rifles and cannons, and so on. He informs them diligently and diligently of his desire to serve the Egyptian homes.

As Ibrahim Pasha returned from the Syrian war in 1259 AH (1834 AD) praised him when Muhammad Ali Pasha, said advised him and his diligence in his service Vonam by the rank of Amirliwa (brigade commander) and returned to his job, and after the death of Mustafa Mukhtar your added to school affairs became Diwan schools director (Minister of Public Knowledge He held this position for about ten years (1839 - 1849).

At the time of Abbas I of Egypt, he assumed the Ministry of Knowledge a few months (October 1849 - May 1850), then transferred to a director of warfare missions and made him, in the eyes of the endowment of the Two Holy Mosques, and the government was blessed with him for the reward of his services with an area of 850 acres in the Serbay District in the Western Directorate.

In Zamanzid Pasha, he made the (Governor of Egypt) and awarded him with the title of Pasha, so he became known as Adham Pasha, and the engineering pen was referred to him with military missions.

During the reign of, Khedive Ismail, he took over the Ministry of Public Education for several months (January - July 1866), then retired, and his death was in 1869.

Ali Pasha Mubarak said about him: "And he was soft-hearted, compassionate, and with great charity, he pursued interests himself without arrogance and not growing up, and courted the needy people until he stood on the truth of their complaints, and he supported the oppressed, took care of the schools and worked hard in the causes of desire in it, so he exalted the hard-working students. And the teachers, and seeks to promote them to strive for others, so the answer appeared in all of them or most of them and they obtained in their time a great achievement, and from its establishment the office of the School of Zainab, may God be pleased with it, and the office of Bulaq and other offices, and as a whole he was like a parent for schoolchildren and also has reforms in the Al-Azhar Mosque at the time of his endowments."

He was met by Marshal Marmon during his visit to Egypt and admired him and his competence. He said about him: "He learned the French language with the strength of his will without a professor, and that he speaks it in a correct tone, and navigated in mathematics and art of artillery, and in my view he matched the best artillery officers and cava managers of its missions, which is One of the strongest people I knew in good management, and that Muhammad Ali's choice of such a man to help him is evidence of the sincerity of his eyesight, his prey, and his good success in choosing his men."

=== Order of Battle 1839 ===
- 1st Guards Artillery Regiment (Hammah), 1372 troops.
- 2nd Artillery Regiment (Alexandria), 2349 troops.
- 3rd Artillery Regiment (Aleppo), 1949 troops.
- 1st Horse Artillery Regiment (Homs), 982 troops.
- 2nd Horse Artillery Regiment (Damascus), 1007 troops.
- Four separated batteries at Acre

Note: Field artillery regiments had 5 battalions with 3 batteries each (6 guns each battery), which makes 18 guns per battalion and 72 guns per regiment.

Horse artillery regiments had 4 batteries (6 guns each) so the regiment would have 24 guns.

=== Order of battle, 1853 ===
- 1st Field Artillery Brigade: (Haziq Pasha)
- 1st Artillery Regiment (Mustafa Bek), 2526 troops.
- 2nd Artillery Regiment (Hussein Bek), 2763 troops.
- 1st Horse Artillery Regiment (unknown), 1486 troops. (independent)

== Early to late 20th century ==
After the Anglo-Egyptian War, the artillery corps turned into a group of small battalions partially commanded by Egyptian officers; the corps itself was under British command, this continued until the treaty of 1936 where as all British officers serving in commanding positions in the Egyptian Army were replaced by Egyptian ones. A process of 'Egyptification' of the military continued until December 1937. In 1938 the Anti-Aircraft branch of the artillery corps was formed and supplied with British made equipment. The artillery corps participated in World War II and in the Axis invasion of Egypt, afterwards, Egypt was under serious threat from the Axis. Egyptian artillery units including the Egyptian 22nd King's Own Artillery and 17th Horse Artillery regiments. The Britain supplied Cairo with an Early Warning Radar especially after the Luftwaffe bombing of Alexandria that was followed by a series of air raids over Egyptian cities. In 1947 the artillery corps had a total of 5 regiments (2 field, 2 anti-aircraft and 1 horse artillery) each with 72 guns. In the 1948 Arab-Israeli War, the Egyptian Expeditionary forces sent to Palestine were supported with 25-pound twenty four guns, eight 18-pound guns and eight 6-pound guns. By the 1950s, and after the Egyptian-Czechoslovak arms deal, hundreds of Soviet-made artillery pieces were commissioned in the Egyptian Army some of which are still in service but in modernized variants. The artillery saw action in the Tripartite Aggression, North Yemen Civil War, Six Day War, War of Attrition where it launched several successful bombardments most notably the March 1969 bombing that destroyed major parts of the Bar Lev Line and caused heavy casualties. Its last two major engagements were during the Yom Kippur War and Gulf War.

== Current structure ==
- Republican Guard S/P Artillery Brigade
- S/P Field Artillery Brigades, reportedly up to twelve (41st Medium Range Artillery Brigade (16th Mechanized Division), 44th, 47th, 49th, 51st, 55th, 59th to 61st, 65th, 69th to 70th)
- Field Artillery Brigades, reportedly up to seventeen. (74th, 79th, 81st, 88th, 92nd, 99th, 122nd to 128th, 188th Medium Range Artillery Brigade, 192nd, 815th, 816th)
- 6 ATGM Brigades (33rd, 44th, 55th, 66th, 77th, 88th)
