= Saad el-Shazly =

Egyptian general (1922–2011)

Saad el-Din el-Shazly
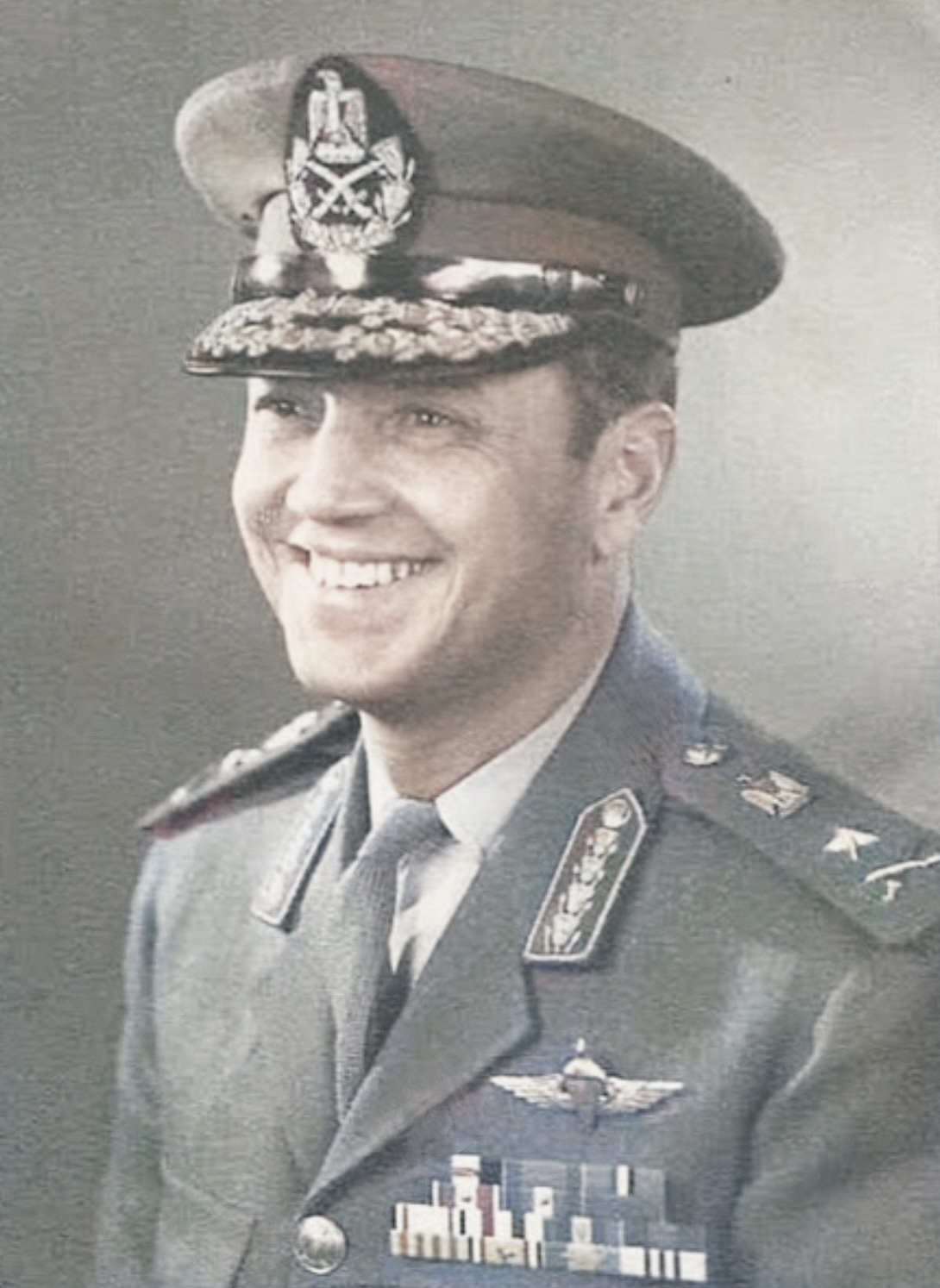
- Born: 1 April 1922; Shubratna, Basyoun, Gharbiya, Kingdom of Egypt
- Died: 10 February 2011 (aged 88); Cairo, Egypt
- Military career
- Allegiance: Egypt: Kingdom of Egypt; United Arab Republic; Egypt
- Branch: Egyptian Army
- Service years: 1942–1973
- Rank: Lieutenant General
- Nickname: The Golden General
- Commands: Commander of the first Paratroops Battalion in Egypt (1955–1959); Commander of the United Arab forces in UN mission to Congo (1960–1961); Military attaché in London (1961–1963); Commander of the 2nd Infantry Division (1965–1967); Commander of the Special forces Corps (Commandos & Paratroopers) (1967–1969); Commander in chief of the Third Field Army (1970–1971); Chief of staff of the Egyptian armed forces (1971–1973)
- Conflicts: See list: World War II; 1948 Arab–Israeli War; Battle of Nitzanim; Suez Crisis; Six-Day War; North Yemeni Civil War; War of Attrition; Bahr El-Baqar primary school bombing (WIA); Yom-Kippur War
- Awards: Order of the Sinai Star; Order of the Nile (Posthumously)

Saad el-Din Mohamed el-Husseiny el-Shazly (Arabic: سعد الدين محمد الحسيني الشاذلي, IPA: [sæʕd edˈdiːn elħoˈseːni eʃˈʃæzli], 1 April 1922 – 10 February 2011) was an Egyptian military officer who served as chief of staff of the Egyptian Armed Forces from 1971 to 1973. Known as the "Golden General", he is credited with planning the Egyptian crossing of the Suez Canal and the capture of the Bar Lev Line at the start of the Yom Kippur War. After clashing with President Anwar Sadat over the conduct of the war, he was dismissed in December 1973, later went into exile in Algeria and was imprisoned after returning to Egypt in 1992.

== Early life ==
Shazly was born on 1 April 1922 in the village of Shabratna, in Basyoun district of Gharbia Governorate in the Nile Delta, into an upper-middle-class family. His father, al-Hajj al-Husseini el-Shazly, was a notary and landowner whose family owned 70 feddans, and he was named after the nationalist leader Saad Zaghloul.

== Military career ==
=== Early career ===
Shazly entered the Military Academy in February 1939 as the youngest student in his class and graduated in July 1940 as an infantry lieutenant. In 1943, he was seconded to the Royal Guard, and he served in the Second World War and the 1948 Palestine War. He joined the Free Officers Movement, but he did not take part directly in the coup of 23 July 1952 because he was on a training course.

=== Paratroopers and the Congo ===
In 1953, Shazly trained with American paratroopers in the United States, and in 1958, he trained in the Soviet Union. He founded Egypt's first parachute unit and commanded it from 1954 to 1959, and during the Suez Crisis of 1956, he commanded the 75th Parachute Battalion. From 1960 to 1961, he commanded the battalion of the United Arab Republic in the United Nations Operation in the Congo, a force of unified Arab troops within the UN peacekeeping mission. He then served as military attaché in London from 1961 to 1963, and from 1965 to 1966, he commanded the 1st Infantry Brigade in the Yemen War.

=== Six-Day War ===
During the Six-Day War in June 1967, Shazly commanded a force of about 1,500 officers and men in central Sinai. After the Israeli air strikes cut his communications with army command, he moved east and positioned his force in the Negev, inside Israel, where it stayed on 6 and 7 June. He then withdrew at night across the Sinai, covering about 200 kilometers, and brought his force back to the canal largely intact.

=== Special Forces and the Red Sea ===
From 1967 to 1969, Shazly commanded the Special Forces, combining the paratroopers and the commandos. During the War of Attrition, he commanded the Red Sea Military Region from 1970 to 1971.

=== Chief of staff ===
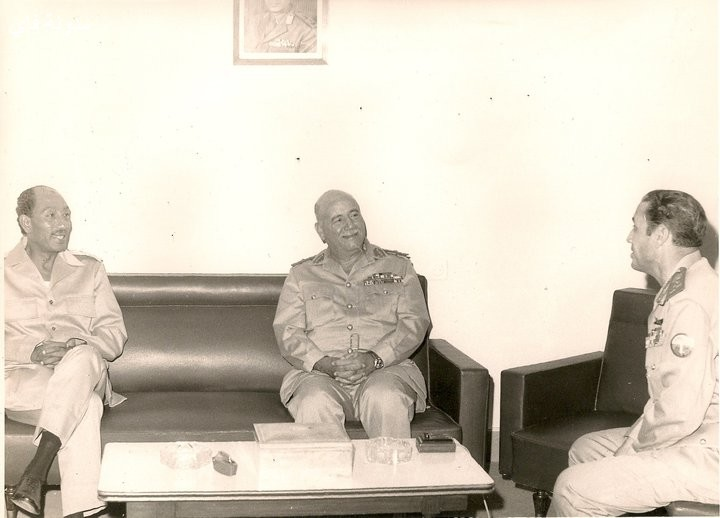
Shazly (right) with Field Marshal Ahmed Ismail and President Sadat, 1973

On 16 May 1971, Sadat appointed Shazly chief of staff of the armed forces. He also served as assistant secretary-general of the Arab League for military affairs. On taking office, he found that the army had a defensive plan, known as Plan 200, and a plan for raids, known as Granite. He drew up the "High Minarets" plan for a limited crossing of the Suez Canal in 1971, but the war minister, Mohamed Sadek, rejected it because it would not liberate all of Sinai and Gaza. After Sadat replaced Sadek with Ahmed Ismail Ali in October 1972, the plan was adopted at the end of that year and renamed "Badr" in September 1973. Shazly also issued 53 directives to officers and troops, including Directive 41, which was written specifically for the crossing.

=== Yom Kippur War ===
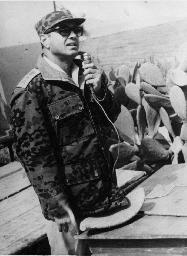
Shazly during the October War

On 6 October 1973, Egyptian forces crossed the canal and broke through the Bar Lev Line under the plan that Shazly had prepared, in what became known as Operation Badr. He then opposed Sadat's decision to extend the attack eastward toward the Sinai passes, as did the commanders of the Second and Third Armies, while Ahmed Ismail, Mohamed Abdel Ghani el-Gamasy and Sadat supported it. The offensive, launched on 14 October partly to relieve pressure on Syria, failed with heavy Egyptian losses. When Israeli forces then crossed to the west bank of the canal, Shazly proposed pulling armored brigades back west to encircle them, but Sadat refused, fearing that the move would look like a withdrawal.

Sadat recalled Shazly from the front and replaced him with el-Gamasy. He was dismissed as chief of staff in December 1973, on the 12th according to Gulf News and the 13th according to Simon Dunstan.

== Later life ==
=== Ambassador and exile ===
After his dismissal, Sadat appointed Shazly ambassador to the United Kingdom, a post he initially refused, and he served in London from 1974 to 1975 and in Portugal from 1975 to 1978. He publicly opposed the Camp David Accords of 1978, resigned and went into exile in Algeria, where he spent about fourteen years. Sadat later claimed that Shazly had "collapsed" at the front, a claim that his daughter later called "an entirely fabricated story". In exile, Shazly wrote his own account of the war, The Crossing of the Suez, which accused Sadat of interfering in military operations and was banned in Egypt.

During the 1980s, Shazly headed the Egyptian National Front, a group of exiled leftist officers. In October 1981, after Sadat's assassination, he told a Beirut newspaper that the front was conducting operations against the new government of Hosni Mubarak because of its commitment to Sadat's policies.

=== Trial and imprisonment ===
A military tribunal tried Shazly in absentia over his book, sentencing him to three years in prison with hard labor for revealing military secrets, and his property in Egypt was confiscated. Ahram Online says that the charge was publishing the book without a license, and that Egyptian military intelligence at the time did not support the accusation that he had revealed secrets. When he returned to Egypt in 1992, he was arrested at the airport, and Mubarak, who had served under him in 1973, insisted that the sentence be carried out. According to his family, he served a year and a half, mostly in solitary confinement at a military hospital. Gulf News reports that a civilian court ordered his release but that Mubarak did not act on the order. After his release, he published The Arab Military Option and wrote commentaries for Arab and international media.

== Death ==
Shazly died on 10 February 2011 at the Armed Forces Medical Center in Cairo after a long illness. He died a day before Mubarak stepped down during the 25 January revolution, and on 11 February, nearly a million protesters in Tahrir Square joined a funeral prayer for him.

== Honors and legacy ==
In October 2012, President Mohamed Morsi posthumously awarded Shazly the Order of the Nile, Egypt's highest award, for his role in the 1973 war. On the second anniversary of his death in February 2013, the armed forces released a documentary about his role in the war. A highway linking the Cairo ring road to the Ismailia desert road was named after him.

== Personal life ==
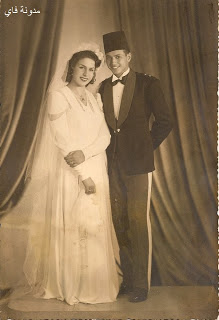
Shazly and his wife on their wedding day

On 13 December 1943, Shazly married Zeinat Mohamed Metwally el-Suhaimi, the daughter of Mohamed Metwally Pasha el-Suhaimi, who had directed the Military Academy in the 1930s. They had three daughters, Shahdan, Nahed and Samia.

== Works ==
- el-Shazly, Saad (1980). The Crossing of the Suez. San Francisco: American Mideast Research. ISBN 0-9604562-0-1.
- The Arab Military Option (Arabic: al-Khiyar al-askari al-Arabi)

== See also ==
- Abdel Moneim Saeed

== Bibliography ==
- Dunstan, Simon (2003). The Yom Kippur War 1973 (2): The Sinai: Sinai Pt. 2 (Campaign). Bloomsbury USA. ISBN 1841762210.
- Shazly, Saad. The Arab Military Option, American Mideast Research (1986).
- Shazly, Saad. The Crossing of the Suez, American Mideast Research (1980: ISBN 0-9604562-0-1.), (2003: Revised ed., ISBN 0-9604562-2-8).
- Shazly, Saad. October War (Arabic ed.), American Mideast Research (2004).
- Shazly, Saad. Our Religious Creed Is Our Way to Victory [Aqidatuna ad-Deeniya Tariquna li'l-Nasr], Cairo: Ministry of Defense (1972).
