= Military Academy for Postgraduate and Strategic Studies =

Higher military academy in Egypt

- الأكاديمية العسكرية للدراسات العليا والاستراتيجية
- Former names: Nasser Military Academy * Nasser Academy for Military Science * Nasser Higher Military Academy
- Motto: الفكر، الإيمان، النصر
- Motto in English: Thought, faith, victory
- Type: Military academy
- Established: March 6, 1965
- Affiliations: Egyptian Armed Forces
- President: Lieutenant General/ Osama Askar
- Principal: Major General/ Ashraf Faris
- Location: Cairo, Egypt
- Language: Arabic
- Website: http://www.nasseracademy.edu.eg/

The Military Academy for Postgraduate and Strategic Studies (Egyptian Arabic: الأكاديمية العسكرية للدراسات العليا والاستراتيجية), formerly Nasser Military Academy (Egyptian Arabic: أكاديمية ناصر للعلوم العسكرية; Nasser Academy for Military Science) or Nasser Higher Military Academy (NHMA) is a higher military academy inaugurated in March 1965 after a republican decree was issued.

It had 1,053 graduates from other countries, such as Algeria, Sudan, UAE, Pakistan, Syria, Iraq, Kuwait, Saudi Arabia, Greece, the Netherlands, Germany, Nigeria and Turkey.
