= Egyptian Military Academy =

Military academy

- الأكاديمية العسكرية المصرية
- Motto: Duty, Honor, Homeland
- Type: Military academy
- Established: 2022; 4 years ago
- Affiliations: Ministry of Defence
- Director: Staff Major General: Mohamed Salah Al Turky
- Location: The New Capital, Cairo Governorate, Egypt
- Campus: Urban Campus
- Website: academy.mod.gov.eg

Egyptian Military Academy is a military academy in Egypt. Traditionally, graduates of the Military Academy are commissioned as officers in the Egyptian Armed Forces, it's established in accordance with Law No. 149 of 2022.

== Affiliated colleges ==
- Egyptian Military College.
- Egyptian Air Defense College.
- Egyptian Naval College.
- Egyptian Air College.
- Military Technical College.

== See also ==
- Military Academy for Postgraduate and Strategic Studies.
