= Commander of the Air Force (Egypt) =

Commander of the Egyptian Air Force
- قائد القوات الجوية المصرية
- Emblem of the EAF

- Flag of the EAF

- Incumbent; Lieutenant General Amr Abdel Rahman Sakr since 16 June 2025
- Egyptian Air Force
- Status: Active
- Member of: Supreme Council of the Armed Forces
- Reports to: Minister of Defense
- Residence: Heliopolis, Cairo, Egypt
- Appointer: President
- Term length: No fixed length
- Formation: 1932
- First holder: Victor Hubert Tait
- Deputy: Chief of Air Staff
- Website: Official website

The Commander of the Air Force (Arabic: قائد القوات الجوية المصرية) is the institutional head and highest-ranking officer of the Egyptian Air Force, responsible for its overall command and operations. The current commander is Lieutenant General Amr Abdel Rahman Sakr.

== List of commanders ==
The following individuals have had command of the Egyptian Air Force:

=== Royal Egyptian Air Force ===
No.	Portrait	Commanders	Took office	Left office	Time in office	Ref.
1	Victor Hubert Tait	Squadron Leader; Victor Hubert Tait (1892–1988)	1932	1936	3–4 years	
2	?	?	1936	1939	2–3 years	.
3	Ali Islam	Air Fleet commander Ali Islam (1884–?)	6 July 1939	20 August 1939	45 days	
4	Hassan Mohammed Abdel Wahab	Major general Hassan Mohammed Abdel Wahab (1887–?)	20 August 1939	21 October 1940	1 year, 62 days	
5	Ali Muwafi	Major general Ali Muwafi (1886–?)	21 October 1940	4 October 1942	1 year, 348 days	
6	Hassan Hosni Taher	Major general Hassan Hosni Taher (1889–?)	4 October 1942	4 November 1944	2 years, 31 days	
7	Mohammed Metwaly	Major general Mohammed Metwaly	8 November 1944	11 March 1947	2 years, 127 days	
8	Mohammed Mustafa Sha'arawy	Major general Mohammed Mustafa Sha'arawy	11 March 1947	23 July 1952	5 years, 134 days	

=== Egyptian Air Force ===
No.	Portrait	Chiefs of Staff	Took office	Left office	Time in office	Ref.
1	Hassan Mahmoud	Air Commander; Hassan Mahmoud	30 July 1952	22 June 1953	357 days	
2	Mohamed Sedky Mahmoud	General; Mohamed Sedky Mahmoud (1914–1984)	23 June 1953	19 September 1959	6 years, 88 days	

=== Egyptian Air Force and Defense ===
No.	Portrait	Commander	Took office	Left office	Time in office	Ref.
1	Mohamed Sedky Mahmoud	General; Mohamed Sedky Mahmoud (1914–1984)	20 September 1959	11 June 1967	7 years, 264 days	

=== Egyptian Air Force ===
No.	Portrait	Commander	Took office	Left office	Time in office	Ref.
1	Madkour Ahmed Abou El-Ezz	Air Vice-Marshal; Madkour Ahmed Abou El-Ezz	11 June 1967	2 November 1967	144 days	
2	Mustafa Shalaby El Hennawy	Air Vice-Marshal; Mustafa Shalaby El Hennawy	2 November 1967	22 June 1969	1 year, 232 days	
3	Ali Mustafa Baghdady	Air Vice-Marshal; Ali Mustafa Baghdady (1922–2005)	22 June 1969	23 April 1972	2 years, 306 days	
4	Hosni Mubarak	Air Chief Marshal; Hosni Mubarak (1928–2020)	23 April 1972	16 April 1975	2 years, 358 days	.
5	Mahmoud Shaker Abd El Moneim	Air Marshal; Mahmoud Shaker Abd El Moneim (1926–1980)	16 April 1975	6 April 1980 †	4 years, 356 days	
6	Mohammed Shabana	Air Marshal; Mohammed Shabana (born 1931)	6 April 1980	14 April 1982	2 years, 8 days	
7	Mohamed Abd El Hamid Helmy	Air Marshal; Mohamed Abd El Hamid Helmy	14 April 1982	15 April 1987	5 years, 1 day	
8	Mohamed Alaa El Din Barakat	Air Marshal; Mohamed Alaa El Din Barakat	15 April 1987	6 April 1990	2 years, 356 days	
9	Ahmed Abdel Rahman Nasser	Air Marshal; Ahmed Abdel Rahman Nasser (1934–2020)	7 April 1990	7 April 1996	6 years, 1 day	
10	Ahmed Shafik	Air Marshal; Ahmed Shafik (born 1941)	7 April 1996	1 March 2002	5 years, 328 days	
11	Magdy Galal Sharawi	Air Marshal; Magdy Galal Sharawi (born 1946)	1 March 2002	20 March 2008	6 years, 19 days	.
12	Reda Mahmoud Hafez Mohamed	Air Marshal; Reda Mahmoud Hafez Mohamed (1952–2013)	20 March 2008	14 August 2012	4 years, 147 days	
13	Younes Hamed	Air Marshal; Younes Hamed (born 1959)	14 August 2012	14 June 2018	5 years, 304 days	.
14	Mohamed Abbas Helmy	Air Marshal; Mohamed Abbas Helmy (born 1961)	14 June 2018	4 October 2022	4 years, 112 days	
15	Mahmoud Foaad Abd El-Gawad	Air Marshal; Mahmoud Foaad Abd El-Gawad (born 1966)	4 October 2022	15 June 2025	4 years, 48 days	
16	Amr Abdel Rahman Sakr	Air Marshal; Amr Abdel Rahman Sakr (born 1969)	16 June 2025	Incumbent	1 year, 158 days	
