= Lotfy =

Lotfy is an Egyptian given name and surname. Notable people called Lotfy include:

Surname:

- Ayman Lotfy (born 1968), Egyptian fine art photographer
- Giana Lotfy or Giana Farouk (born 1994), Egyptian karateka
- Hala Lotfy (born 1973), Egyptian film director and producer
- Karim Samir Lotfy (born 1989), Egyptian high jumper
- Mohamed Lotfy (actor) (born 1968), Egyptian actor
- Mohamed Lotfy (human rights defender) (born 1981), co-founder & executive director of the Egyptian Commission for Rights and Freedoms
- Nabiha Lotfy (1937–2015), Lebanese-born actor and film director

Given name:

- Aly Lotfy Mahmoud (1935–2018), Prime Minister of Egypt (1985–1986)
- Daniel Lotfy Khella (born 1969), Egyptian Coptic Catholic bishop
- Lotfy El Tanbouli (1919–1982), painter and Egyptologist
- Lotfy Mustafa Kamal (born 1952), Egyptian Minister of Civil Aviation, Egyptian Air Force commander
- Lotfy Labib (1947–2025), Egyptian stage, television and film actor
- Mohammed Lotfy Gomaa (1886–1953), Egyptian patriot, essayist, author, and barrister
- Mohammed Lotfy Shabana (born 1931), senior commander in the Egyptian Air Force
