= Sharawi =

Sharawi is an Arabic surname which is also used as a masculine given name. Notable people with the name include:

== Surname ==
- Huda Sha'arawi (1879–1947), Egyptian political figure and feminist
- Magdy Galal Sharawi (born 1946), Egyptian military officer
- Muhammad Metwalli al-Sha'rawi (1911–1998), Egyptian Islamic scholar

== Given name ==
- Sharawi Gomaa (1920–1988), Egyptian military officer and politician
