= Sedky =

Sedky (Arabic: صدقي) is an Egyptian surname.

Notable people with this surname include:

- Atef Sedky (1930–2005), Egyptian politician
- Aziz Sedky (1920–2008), Egyptian politician and engineer
- Ismail Sedky (1875–1950), Egyptian politician
- Mohamed Sedky Mahmoud (1914–1984), Egyptian military leader
- Reeham Sedky (born 1997), American squash player
