= Sameh El-Hefny =

Egyptian Minister of Civil Aviation (born 1966)

- سامح أحمد زكي الحفني

Minister of Civil Aviation
- Incumbent
- Assumed office 3 July 2024
- President: Abdel Fattah el-Sisi
- Prime Minister: Mostafa Madbouly
- Preceded by: Mohamed Abbas Helmy

Personal details
- Born: 7 June 1966 (age 60) Cairo, Egypt
- Education: Ain Shams University; Egyptian Aviation Academy; Toulouse Business School; Arab Academy for Science, Technology and Maritime Transport; Port Said University
- Occupation: Airline pilot, aviation executive

Sameh Ahmed Zaki El-Hefny (Arabic: سامح أحمد زكي الحفني; born 7 June 1966), also transliterated Sameh Elhefny or Sameh Al-Hafni, is an Egyptian airline pilot, aviation executive, and government official who has served as the Minister of Civil Aviation of Egypt since 3 July 2024 in the cabinet of Prime Minister Mostafa Madbouly. A career pilot who joined the national carrier EgyptAir in 1988, he rose through its training and operations divisions before holding the country's most senior aviation posts, including Chairman and Chief Executive Officer of EgyptAir Holding Company, President of the Egyptian Civil Aviation Authority (ECAA), and Egypt's Permanent Representative on the Council of the International Civil Aviation Organization (ICAO).

== Early life and education ==
El-Hefny was born in Cairo on 7 June 1966. He earned a bachelor's degree in commerce (business administration) from Ain Shams University in Cairo and a bachelor's degree in aviation sciences from the Egyptian Aviation Academy, also referred to as the National Institute for Aviation Training.

He subsequently pursued graduate study in both management and aviation. He holds a Master of Business Administration specialising in airport and airline (aerospace) management from Toulouse Business School in France, and a Master of Public Administration from the Arab Academy for Science, Technology and Maritime Transport. He later completed a Doctor of Philosophy (PhD) in civil aviation crisis management, awarded by the Faculty of Engineering at Port Said University.

== Aviation career ==
=== EgyptAir ===
El-Hefny began his career as a pilot with EgyptAir, Egypt's flag carrier, in 1988, and developed into a captain, flight instructor, and examiner. Over his three-decade career with the airline and its subsidiaries he held a series of technical and managerial positions, including General Manager of Aviation Training at the Flight Training Center, Vice-President of the EgyptAir Training Center, General Manager within EgyptAir Airlines' Flight Operations Sector, and General Manager of the Technical Office (Chairman's Bureau) of EgyptAir Airlines. He was involved in several strategic committees during a transitional period for the company, including EgyptAir's accession to the Star Alliance.

He served as Chairman and Chief Executive Officer of EgyptAir Holding Company from March 2014 to 2015. In 2012 he was appointed Chairman of the Egyptian Aviation Academy, the country's principal aviation training institution.

=== Egyptian Civil Aviation Authority ===
El-Hefny held the most senior regulatory posts in Egyptian aviation, having earlier served as Vice-President of the Egyptian Civil Aviation Authority (ECAA). He headed the ECAA as its President on more than one occasion: according to the Egyptian Gazette, first from December 2009 to October 2011, and again from 2018 to 2020. Some sources instead date a single term as President of the authority to 2018–2019.

=== International roles ===
El-Hefny served as Egypt's Permanent Representative and a Council Member of the International Civil Aviation Organization (ICAO), the United Nations specialised agency for civil aviation, a role he assumed in 2022. Within ICAO's regional structures, he chaired the Regional Aviation Safety Group – Middle East (RASG-MID), to which he was elected in 2011, and the Technical Committee of the ICAO General Assembly, and he sat on the regional technical safety team for the Middle East (TLST-MID).

He was elected to the Board of Governors and the Nominating Committee of the International Air Transport Association (IATA) in 2014. He has also served on the executive boards or committees of the Star Alliance, the Arab Air Carriers' Organization (AACO), the African Airlines Association (AFRAA), and the Arab Civil Aviation Organization (ACAO), as well as the boards of Egyptian aviation bodies including the holding company for airports and air navigation and the Cairo Airport Company.

He holds pilot certification from the Egyptian civil aviation authorities as a captain, instructor, and examiner across several aircraft types. He is rated on the Airbus A330/A340 and was previously qualified on the Boeing 747, Boeing 737, Airbus A320, and Airbus A300-600.

== Minister of Civil Aviation ==
=== Appointment ===
El-Hefny was nominated to lead the Ministry of Civil Aviation in early July 2024 as part of a wide-ranging reshuffle of Madbouly's government that replaced ministers across roughly 20 portfolios. He took the constitutional oath before President Abdel Fattah el-Sisi at Al-Ittihadiya Palace on 3 July 2024, succeeding Air Marshal Mohamed Abbas Helmy, a former commander of the Egyptian Air Force who had held the post since August 2022. As an experienced commercial aviator and industry executive, El-Hefny's appointment was widely characterised as the selection of a technocrat for the portfolio. He was retained as Minister of Civil Aviation in the subsequent cabinet reshuffle approved by the House of Representatives in February 2026.

His ministerial programme has been framed around Egypt Vision 2030, the national development strategy, with stated goals of modernising aviation infrastructure, attracting private-sector investment, strengthening the financial position of EgyptAir, and positioning Egypt as a regional aviation hub.

=== Airport privatisation programme ===
A central element of El-Hefny's tenure has been a programme to bring private-sector participation into the management and operation of Egyptian airports while retaining state ownership of the assets. In March 2025, the ministry engaged the International Finance Corporation (IFC), part of the World Bank Group, as transaction adviser to develop a public–private partnership (PPP) strategy covering 11 airports. The initiative forms part of Egypt's broader state asset-monetisation programme launched in June 2023 and is intended to fund upgrades and expansion without drawing on the national budget.

Hurghada International Airport, a principal Red Sea tourism gateway and one of Egypt's busiest airports, was selected as the pilot for the programme. The qualification process for prospective operators opened in December 2025; the period for collecting tender documents was extended to 12 March 2026 after strong market interest, with the ministry reporting that dozens of international companies and consortia had obtained the terms of reference. The Egyptian Holding Company for Airports and Air Navigation (EHCAAN) remains the asset owner, with the concession centred on operational management and commercial development rather than ownership transfer. Airports identified for subsequent phases of the strategy include Sphinx, Sharm El Sheikh, Borg El Arab, Luxor, Aswan, Sohag, Assiut, Abu Simbel, El Alamein, and Marsa Matruh. El-Hefny has stated that Cairo International Airport is excluded from the privatisation study, and has set a target of roughly doubling national airport capacity to about 100 million passengers a year by the end of the decade.

=== Cairo Airport and infrastructure ===
Under El-Hefny, the ministry has advanced a multibillion-dollar expansion of Cairo International Airport, which he has described as having reached maximum capacity. The plan centres on the construction of a fourth passenger terminal (Terminal 4), reported as a project of around US$3.5 billion, intended to raise the airport's annual capacity to approximately 30 million passengers. The works have been linked to a wider "New Republic Air Gateway" development reviewed by President el-Sisi. The ministry has also pursued a restructuring of Egyptian airspace to shorten flight paths and reduce fuel burn and carbon emissions, alongside modernisation of air-traffic-control systems.

=== EgyptAir and fleet modernisation ===
El-Hefny has overseen a fleet-expansion and financial-turnaround programme at EgyptAir. He told a committee of the Egyptian Senate that the carrier, which operated about 72 aircraft, would take delivery of 28 additional aircraft across 2026 and 2027 as part of a broader modernisation plan, with longer-term projections of a fleet of around 97 aircraft by 2030–31 and figures of up to roughly 125 aircraft cited for the coming years. He reported that EgyptAir had cut its accumulated losses—incurred after the COVID-19 pandemic, currency devaluations, and rising foreign-debt costs—by more than half, returning to positive results for the 2024/25 fiscal year, with the aim of eliminating remaining losses within four years. He noted that the airline placed 68th in the 2025 Skytrax World Airline Awards, an improvement on prior years. The ministry has additionally set out plans to expand the low-cost subsidiary Air Cairo from about 42 aircraft toward 82 aircraft over four years.

=== International engagement ===
As minister, El-Hefny has represented Egypt in international aviation diplomacy. In January 2025, he visited the headquarters of EUROCONTROL in Brussels, where he was briefed on European air-traffic-management operations; Egypt and EUROCONTROL have cooperated on air-navigation charges since 2004, reflecting Egypt's role as a gateway between European and African and Middle Eastern airspace. In February 2025 he led a sectoral mission to London to promote investment and technical cooperation with the United Kingdom, including meetings with his British counterpart and UK aviation firms on airport development, fleet modernisation, and technology.

== See also ==
- Ministry of Civil Aviation (Egypt)
- EgyptAir
- Egyptian Civil Aviation Authority
- Cairo International Airport
