= Ministry of Civil Aviation (Egypt) =

Government ministry of Egypt

Arab Republic of Egypt Ministry of Civil Aviation
- وزارة الطيران المدني
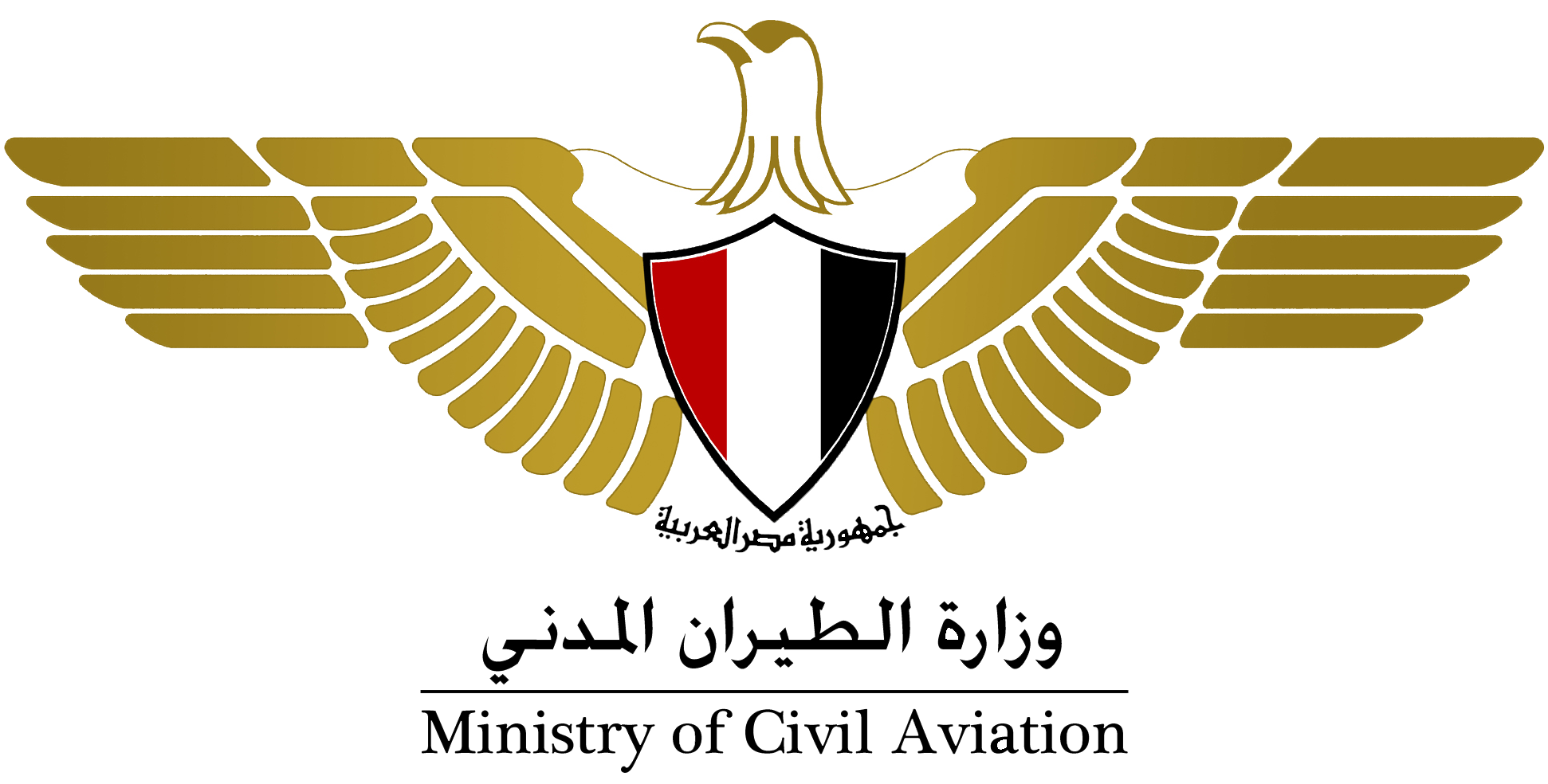
- Emblem of Egypt

Agency overview
- Formed: 2002; 24 years ago
- Jurisdiction: Government of Egypt
- Headquarters: New Administrative Capital, Cairo Governorate
- Agency executive: Sameh El-Hefny, Minister
- Website: www.civilaviation.gov.eg

The Ministry of Civil Aviation of Egypt (MCA, Arabic: وزارة الطيران المدني), formed in 2002, is the ministry in charge of civil aviation in Egypt. Since July 2024 the minister has been Sameh El-Hefny.

== Duties ==
The ministry sets civil aviation regulations, sets airworthiness and all flight rules, and air standards that must be met, making amendments as needed. It ensures Egyptian airline and flight operations follow safety rules such as those put forth by International Aviation and the European Common Aviation Area (ECAA).

One of the ministry's primary duties is to conduct investigations of airplane accidents, and to issue regular progress reports on such investigations. The agency for such is the Egyptian Aircraft Accident Investigation Directorate (EAAID, Arabic: الدارة المركزية لحوادث الطيران).

The ministry is also responsible for negotiating the resumption of flights between Egypt and other countries following an aviation incident.

The ministry is tasked with managing the fair competition between state-run airlines such as EgyptAir and private airlines, of which there are 14, but private airlines have complained that EgyptAir has monopolized the industry.

== History ==
The ministry was established in 2002 by separating civil aviation responsibilities from the Ministry of Transport and Communications. The Ministry of Civil Aviation is headquartered in Cairo.

The Egyptian Civil Aviation Authority (ECAA, Arabic: سلطة الطيران المدني المصري), subordinate to the ministry, is the civil aviation authority of Egypt.

In early 2018, the Ministry of Civil Aviation, the Ministry of Tourism, and other interested stakeholders discussed the roadblocks that must be addressed to develop the tourism sector near Taba, served by Taba International Airport.

In July 2024, Sameh El-Hefny—a former airline pilot and twice head of the Egyptian Civil Aviation Authority—was appointed Minister of Civil Aviation in a cabinet reshuffle. Under his tenure the ministry began introducing private-sector participation in airport operations: in March 2025 it engaged the International Finance Corporation to develop a public–private partnership strategy for 11 airports, with Hurghada International Airport selected as the first to be offered to private operators. The ministry also advanced a major expansion of Cairo International Airport, including the construction of a fourth passenger terminal.

== Ministers ==
- Ahmed Abdel Rahman Nasser (2002)
- Ahmed Shafiq (2002–2011)
- Ibrahim Manaa (2011-2011)
- Lotfi Mustafa Kamal (2011-2012)
- Hussein Massoud (2012)
- Alaa Ashour (2012) (announced for two hours but never sworn in)
- Samir Imbabi (2012)
- Wael El-Maadawi (2012-2013)
- Abdel Aziz Fadel (2013–2014)
- Mohamed Hossam Kamal (2014-2016)
- Sharif Fathi (2016-2018)
- Younes Hamed (June, 2018-2019)
- Mohamed Manar (2019–2022)
- Mohamed Abbas Helmy (2022-2024)
- Sameh El-Hefny (2024–present)

== Investigations ==
- EgyptAir Flight 990 (1999)
- Flash Airlines Flight 604 (2004)
- EgyptAir Flight 667 (2011)
- Luxor hot air balloon crash (2013)
- EgyptAir Flight 804 (2016)

== Complexes ==
The Egyptian Civil Aviation Authority (ECAA) is based in the Egyptian Civil Aviation Complex on Airport Road. The International Civil Aviation Organization (ICAO) has its Middle East Regional Office on the property of the Egyptian Civil Aviation Complex.

== See also ==
- Cabinet of Egypt
