= Younes Hamed =

Egyptian air marshal

Younes Al Sayed Hamed Al Masry
- يونس السيد حامد المصري
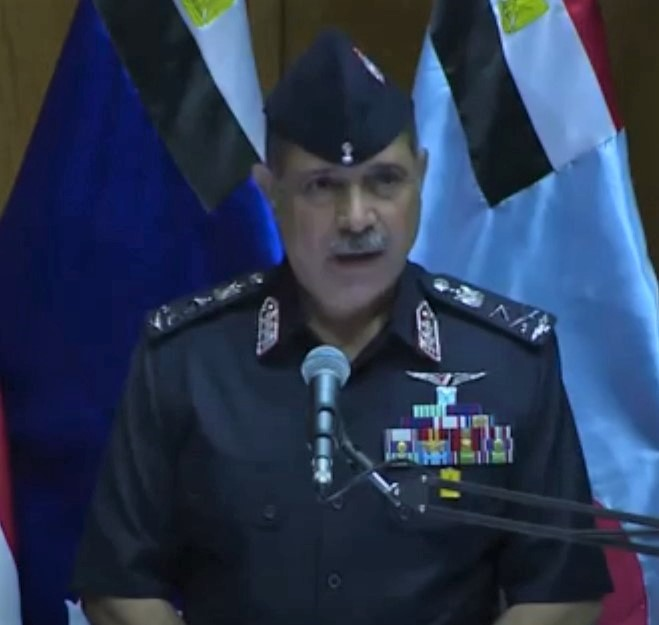

11th Minister of Civil Aviation
- In office 14 June 2018 – 21 June 2018
- Prime Minister: Mostafa Madbouly
- Preceded by: Sherif Fathi

Commander-in-Chief of the Egyptian Air Force
- In office 14 August 2012 – 14 June 2018
- President: Mohamed Morsi; Adly Mansour (Acting); Abdel Fattah el-Sisi
- Preceded by: Reda Mahmoud Hafez Mohamed

Personal details
- Born: 15 August 1959 (age 66) Sohag Governorate, Egypt

Military service
- Allegiance: Egypt
- Branch/service: Egyptian Air Force
- Years of service: 1979–2018
- Rank: Air Marshal

Air Marshal Younes Hamed Al-Masri (Arabic: يونس حامد; born 15 August 1959) is the Minister of Civil Aviation, and was the Commander of the Egyptian Air Force from 2012 until 2018.

Hamed graduated from the Egyptian Air Academy on 16 December 1979. During his service in the Egyptian Air Force he was the commander of a flying squadron, an air brigade commander and an air area commander.

He was appointed to the post by President Mohamed Morsi on 14 August 2012, succeeding Reda Mahmoud Hafez Mohamed. He is a member of the Supreme Council of the Armed Forces, which was reorganized in September 2012. On 4 November 2013 he was promoted to the rank of air marshal. In 2015, he met with US Lieutenant General Charles Q. Brown Jr. to discuss military cooperation between Egypt and the United States. On 14 June 2018, he was appointed as the new Minister of Civil Aviation in Prime Minister Mostafa Madbouly's new cabinet.

== Military education ==
- Bachelor of aviation and military sciences
- Destructive capabilities' Course
- M.A. of military sciences from the Egyptian Command and Staff College
- War Course, Fellowship of the Higher War College, Nasser's Military Sciences Academy
- Crisis Management, Nasser's Military Sciences Academy

== Decorations and Medals ==
- Longevity and Exemplary Medal
- Military Duty Decoration, Second Class
- Military Duty Decoration, First Class
- Distinguished Service Decoration
- 25 January Revolution Medal

Military offices
Preceded by Reda Mahmoud Hafez Mohamed	Commander of the Egyptian Air Force; 2012 – 2018	Succeeded by Mohamed Abbas Helmy
