= History of Egypt under Hosni Mubarak =

Period lasting from 1981 to 2011

The history of Egypt under Hosni Mubarak began with the 1981 assassination of President Anwar Sadat and lasted until the Egyptian revolution of January 2011, when Mubarak was overthrown in a popular uprising as part of the broader Arab Spring movement. His presidency was marked by a continuation of the policies pursued by his predecessor, including the liberalization of Egypt's economy and a commitment to the 1979 Camp David Accords. The Egyptian government under Mubarak also maintained close relations with the other member states of the Arab League, as well as the United States, Russia, India, and much of the Western World. However, international non-governmental organizations such as Amnesty International and Human Rights Watch have repeatedly criticized his administration's human rights record. Concerns raised include political censorship, police brutality, arbitrary detention, torture, and restrictions on freedoms of speech, association, and assembly.

Mubarak's presidency greatly impacted Egyptian society and politics. This is in large part due to Egypt's political structure, in which the President must approve all pieces of legislation and state expenditures before they are enacted.

== Politics ==
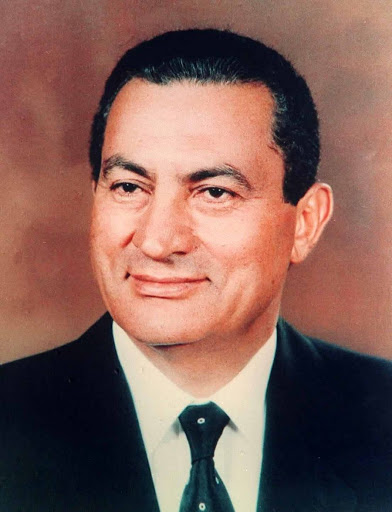
Hosni Mubarak

Hosni Mubarak became the President of Egypt following the assassination of Anwar Sadat on 6 October 1981; this was subsequently legitimized a few weeks later through a referendum in the People's Assembly, the lower house of Egypt's bicameral legislature. He had previously served as Vice President since 1975, a position he gained after rising through the ranks of the Egyptian Air Force during the preceding two decades. He also held the title of Deputy Defence Minister at the time of the 1973 October War.

Political reform was limited during this period. Prior to 2005, opposition candidates were not permitted to run for president, with the position instead being reaffirmed via referendum in the People's Assembly at regular six-year intervals. This changed after a constitutional amendment on 25 May 2005, which transformed it into a de jure elected office accountable to the Egyptian people. Presidential elections were held four months later, with Mubarak receiving nearly 89% of the popular vote against two other candidates. In order to be listed on the ballot, a presidential candidate must have the endorsement of a political party and the approval of a national election commission. Opposition parties called on voters to boycott the referendum as meaningless, but it passed with over 80% approval.

Shortly after mounting an unprecedented presidential campaign, Nour was jailed on forgery charges critics called phony; he was released on 18 February 2009. Brotherhood members were allowed to run for parliament in 2005 as independents, garnering 88 seats, or 20 percent of the People's Assembly.

The opposition parties have been weak and divided and compared to the NDP. The November 2000 People's Assembly elections saw 34 members of the opposition win seats in the 454-seat assembly, facing a clear majority of 388 ultimately affiliated with the ruling National Democratic Party (NDP). The Muslim Brotherhood, founded in Egypt in 1928, was kept an illegal organization and not recognized as a political party (current Egyptian law prohibits the formation of political parties based on religion). Members are known publicly and openly speak their views. Members of the Brotherhood have been elected to the People's Assembly and local councils as independents. The Egyptian political opposition also includes groups and popular movements such as Kefaya and the April 6 Youth Movement, although they are somewhat less organized than officially registered political parties. Bloggers, or cyberactivists as Courtney C. Radsch terms them, have also played an important political opposition role, writing, organizing, and mobilizing public opposition.

President Mubarak had tight, autocratic control over Egypt. A dramatic drop in support for Mubarak and his domestic economic reform program increased with surfacing news about his son Alaa being favored in government tenders and privatization. As Alaa started getting out of the picture by 2000, Mubarak's second son Gamal started rising in the National Democratic Party and succeeded in getting a newer generation of neo-liberals into the party and eventually the government. Gamal Mubarak branched out with a few colleagues to set up Medinvest Associates Ltd., which manages a private equity fund, and to do some corporate finance consultancy work.

== Foreign policy ==
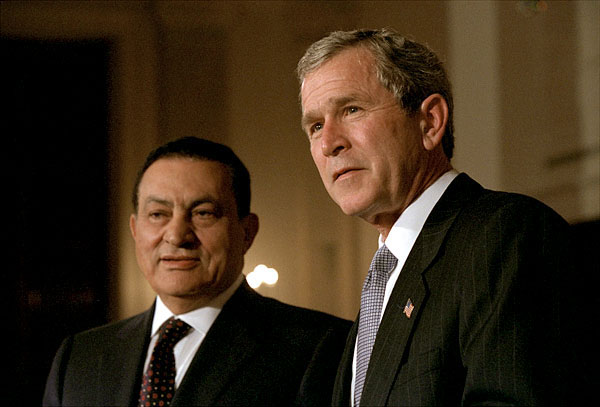
American president George W. Bush and Mubarak, 2002

Mubarak maintained Egypt's commitment to the Camp David peace process, while restoring relations with other Arab states. Mubarak also restored relations with USSR three years after Sadat's expulsion of Soviet experts. In January 1984, Egypt was readmitted to the Organisation of Islamic Cooperation; in November 1987, an Arab summit resolution allowed other Arab countries to resume diplomatic relations with Egypt; and in 1989 Egypt was readmitted to the Arab League. Egypt also played a moderating role in international forums such as the United Nations and the Non-Aligned Movement.

Under Mubarak, Egypt was a staunch ally of the United States, whose aid to Egypt has averaged $1.5 billion a year since the 1979 signing of the Camp David Peace Accords. Egypt was a member of the allied coalition in the 1991 Gulf War, and Egyptian infantry were some of the first to land in Saudi Arabia to evict Iraqi forces from Kuwait. Egypt's involvement in the coalition was deemed by the George H. W. Bush administration as crucial in garnering wider Arab support for the liberation of Kuwait.

Although unpopular among Egyptians, the participation of Egyptian forces brought financial benefits for the Egyptian government. Reports that sums as large as $500,000 per soldier were paid or debt forgiven were published in the news media. According to The Economist:

The programme worked like a charm: a textbook case, says the IMF. In fact, luck was on Hosni Mubarak's side; when the US was hunting for a military alliance to force Iraq out of Kuwait, Egypt's president joined without hesitation. After the war, his reward was that America, the Arab states of the Persian Gulf, and Europe forgave Egypt around $14 billion of debt.

Egypt acted as a mediator between Syria and Turkey in a 1998 dispute over boundaries, Turkey's diversion of water, and alleged Syrian support for Kurdish rebels.

Mubarak did not support the 2003 invasion of Iraq by the US, arguing that the Israeli–Palestinian conflict should have been resolved first. In 2009, when the Obama administration "indicated it would consider" extending protection to its Middle Eastern allies "if Iran continues its disputed nuclear activities", Mubarak stated "Egypt will not be part of any American nuclear umbrella intended to protect the Gulf countries."

== Unrest and terror ==
Unrest was not uncommon during Mubarak's reign. In February 1986 the Central Security Forces mutinied taking to the streets, rioting, burning and looting in demand for better pay. The uprising was the greatest challenge of the Mubarak presidency up to that point and only the second time in modern Egyptian history the Army was dispatched to Egyptian streets to restore order.

In 1992, 14,000 soldiers occupied the Giza shantytown suburb of Imbaba (est. population 1,000,000) for six-weeks arresting and removing some 5000 people, after al-Gama'a al-Islamiyya followers of Sheik Omar Abdel-Rahman attempted to take control there. In the following years al-Gama'a al-Islamiyya waged war against the state and against foreigners. In one year (1993) 1106 persons were killed or wounded. More police (120) than terrorists (111) were killed that year and "several senior police officials and their bodyguards were shot dead in daylight ambushes."

In 1997, at least 71 people, mostly Swiss tourists, were massacred by al-Gama'a al-Islamiyya gunmen at the Hatshepsut Temple outside Luxor. In July 2005, a series of bombings left 86 people dead and over 150 wounded in the Red Sea resort of Sharm el-Sheikh.

During 2007 and 2008, Egypt witnessed more than 150 demonstrations and strikes, which were partially "violent and required heavy deployment of the security forces."

== Human rights ==
A state of emergency remained in force throughout the entirety of Mubarak's presidency and provided a basis for arbitrary detention and unfair trials. Human rights violations on the part of Egyptian security services during Mubarak's rule were described as "systematic" by Amnesty International. In 2007, Amnesty International reported that the Egyptian police routinely engaged in "beatings, electric shocks, prolonged suspension by the wrists and ankles in contorted positions, death threats and sexual abuse". In 2009, Human Rights Watch estimated between 5,000 and 10,000 Egyptians were held without charge. Police and security forces regularly used torture and brutality. According to the Egyptian Organization for Human Rights, 701 cases of torture at Egyptian police stations were documented from 1985 to 2011, and 204 victims died of torture and mistreatment. The group contends that crimes of torture "occur in Egyptian streets in broad daylight, at police checkpoints, and in people's homes in flagrant violation of the people's dignity and freedom."

Freedom of speech, association and assembly were limited under Mubarak. The Press Law, Publications Law, and the penal code regulated the press, and called for punishment by fines or imprisonment for those who criticized the president. Freedom House upgraded Egypt's Press Freedom status in 2008 from "Not Free" to "Partly Free" in recognition not of a liberalization of government policy, but "of the courage of Egyptian journalists to cross "red lines" that previously restricted their work and in recognition of the greater range of viewpoints represented in the Egyptian media and blogosphere. This progress occurred in spite of the government's ongoing—and in some cases increasing—harassment, repression, and imprisonment of journalists."

In 2005, Reporters Without Borders placed Egypt 143rd out of 167 nations on press freedoms, and its 2006 report cited continued harassment and, in three cases, imprisonment, of journalists. The two sources agree that promised reforms on the subject have been disappointingly slow or uneven in implementation.

== Economy ==
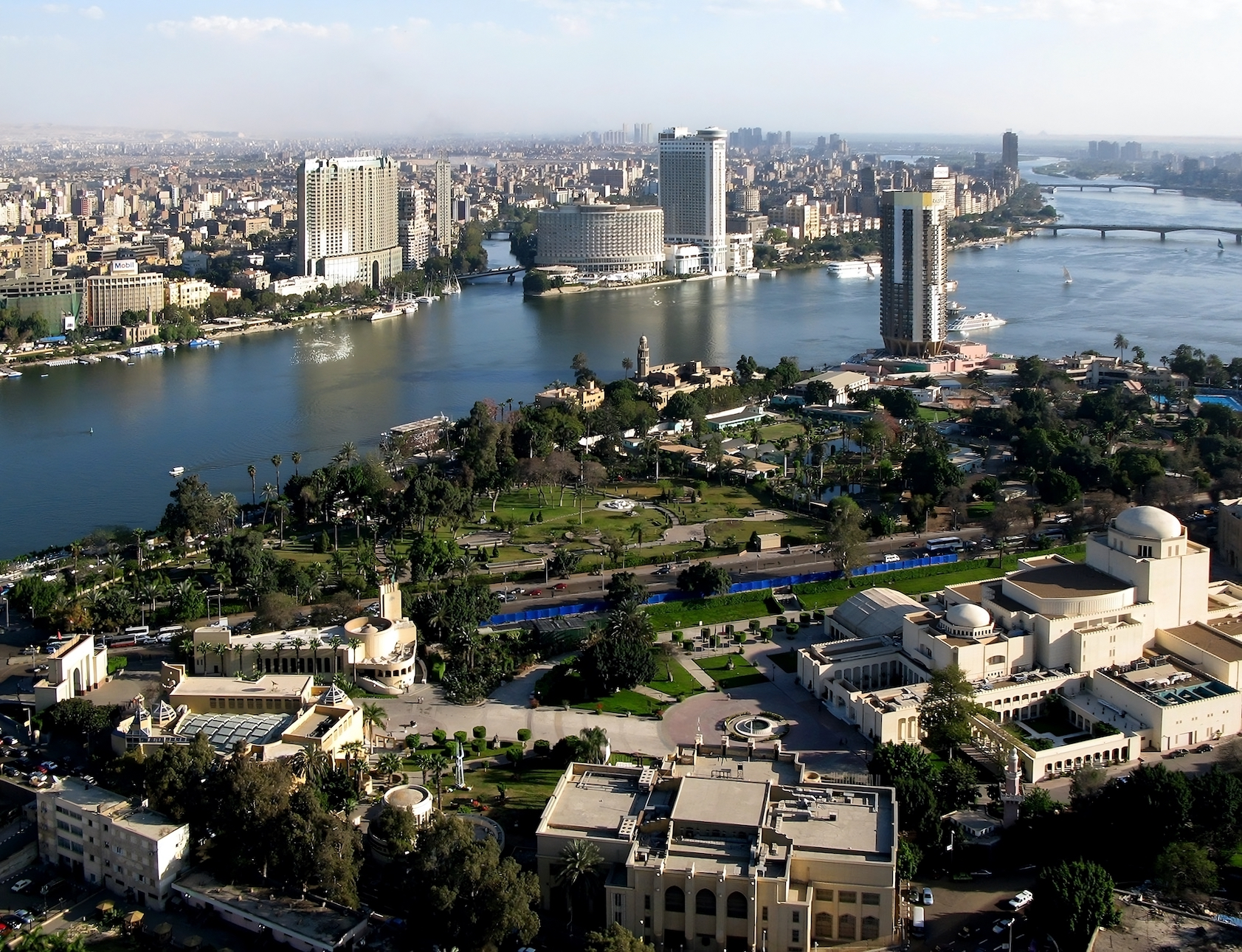
Cairo in 2007

From 1991, Mubarak undertook an ambitious domestic economic reform program to reduce the size of the public sector and expand the role of the private sector. During the 1990s, a series of International Monetary Fund arrangements, coupled with massive external debt relief resulting from Egypt's participation in the Gulf War coalition, helped Egypt improve its macroeconomic performance.

In the last two decades of Mubarak's reign, inflation was lowered and from 1981 to 2006, GDP per capita based on purchasing-power-parity (PPP) increased fourfold (from US$1355 in 1981 to an estimated US$4535 in 2006, and US$6180 in 2010).

However this growth was far from evenly spread. Monetary restructuring, especially the flotation of the Egyptian pound, the liberalization of the country's money markets, a reform of the tax system and strategic reductions in governmental social spending, resulted in "staggering hardships for the majority of the people" according to at least one observer. With housing scarcer and more expensive "marriage became harder for young people; it became common to have a family of six or seven living together in a single room." In many Egyptian households, it was common for family members to take turns sleeping on the same beds as overcrowding made it impossible to have more space for beds for everyone. Only a quarter of poorer Egyptian families purchased toothpaste for their children as toothpaste was considered to be a luxury item for the poor of Egypt.

As of 1989, early in the Mubarak era, Egypt continued to have a skewed distribution of wealth; about 2,000 families had annual incomes in excess of E£35,000, while more than 4 million people earned less than E£200. Social conditions in Egypt improved but modernization "did not succeed in reaching a critical mass of its citizens," furthermore "some of the recent gains were reversed due to the 2008 food price crisis and fuel price shock and to the global crisis-related slowdown in economic activity." According to the World Bank:

infant mortality and malnutrition among children under five both decreased by half and life expectancy rose from 64 to 71 years. The economy and the living standards for the vast majority of the population improved, although in an uneven manner. While 18% of the Egyptian population still lives below the national poverty line, this figure goes up to 40% in rural Upper Egypt – and an additional 20% of the population has experienced poverty at one point during the last decade, heightening a sense of social vulnerability and insecurity.

According to an article by The Seattle Times in January 2011, "about half the population [of Egypt] live[d] on $2 a day or less."

== State corruption ==
While in office, political corruption in the Mubarak administration's Ministry of Interior rose dramatically, due to the increased power over the institutional system that is necessary to secure the prolonged presidency. Such corruption has led to the imprisonment of political figures and young activists without trials, illegal undocumented hidden detention facilities, and rejecting universities, mosques, newspapers staff members based on political inclination. On a personnel level, each individual officer is allowed to violate citizens' privacy in his area using unconditioned arrests due to the emergency law.

In 2010, Transparency International's Corruption Perceptions Index report assessed Egypt with a CPI score of 3.1 out of 10.0, based on perceptions of the degree of corruption from business people and country analysts, (10 being no corruption and 0 being totally corrupt). Egypt ranked 98th out of the 178 countries included in the report.

== Society and education ==
Early in the Mubarak presidency (1986), a census found Egypt's population at 50.4 million, including about 2.3 million Egyptians working in other countries. More than 34% of the population was twelve years old or younger, and 68% under the age of thirty. Fewer than 3% of Egyptians were sixty-five years or older. Like most developing countries there was a steady influx of rural inhabitants to the urban areas, but just over half the population still lived in villages. In 2010, The Economist reported the claim that Egypt's population was mostly rural was due to the fact that the villages whose population had expanded to over 100, 000 people were not classified as towns and in fact three-quarters of Egyptians were living in urban areas. In 1989 average life expectancy at birth was 59 for men and 60 for women. The infant mortality rate was 94 deaths per 1,000 births. A survey in 2010 showed that 93% of Egyptians living in villages complained that the villages lacked proper sewage with human excrement being dumped in the Nile. The same survey showed that 85% of Egyptian households did not have garbage service, leading to people burning their rubbish, dumping it on the streets or canals, or letting animals eat their rubbish. Visitors to Egypt almost always commented on the "grubbiness" of Egyptian streets that were covered with garbage and human excrement. The World Bank estimated that there were about 16 million Egyptians living in squatter settlements. Almost all Egyptian households had electricity and piped water, but the quality of the service varied widely with the poor households getting only a few hours of electricity per day and erratic amounts of water that was often polluted, leading to high rates of kidney diseases.

Under a law pass shortly before the Mubarak presidency, the structure of pre-university public education in Egypt made a nine-year education compulsory. Despite this most parents removed their children from school before they graduated from ninth grade. The basic cycle included six years of primary school and after passing special examinations, three years of intermediate school. Another special examinations gained admittance to the non-compulsory secondary cycle (grades ten through twelve). Secondary students chose between a general (college preparatory) curriculum of humanities, mathematics, or the sciences: and a technical curriculum of agriculture, communications, or industry. Students could advance between grades only after they received satisfactory scores on standardized tests.

As in many poor countries the enrollment rate for girls lagged boys. In 1985–86, early in the Mubarak presidency, only 45% of all primary students were girls. An estimated 75% of girls, but 94% of boys, between the ages of six and twelve were enrolled in primary school. In Upper Egypt less than 30% of all students were girls. Girls also dropped out of primary school more frequently than boys. Girls accounted for about 41 percent of total intermediate school enrollment and 39 percent of secondary school enrollment. Among all girls aged twelve to eighteen in 1985–86, only 46 percent were enrolled in school.

== Overthrow ==
Mubarak was ousted following eighteen days of demonstrations during the 2011 Egyptian revolution, which began on 25 January. On 11 February, Vice President Omar Suleiman, who was appointed thirteen days prior, announced that Mubarak had resigned as president and transferred authority to the Supreme Council of the Armed Forces. On 13 April, a prosecutor ordered Mubarak and both his sons to be detained for 15 days of questioning about allegations of corruption and abuse of power. He was then ordered to stand trial on charges of premeditated murder of peaceful protestors during the revolution.

== See also ==
- 2011 Egyptian revolution
- Hosni Mubarak
- Liberalism in Egypt
- Terrorism in Egypt
