= Emergency law in Egypt =

State of emergency in Egypt

In Egypt, the emergency law (Law No. 162/1958) details the governance and declaration mechanisms of a state of emergency.

During a state of emergency, government and police powers are extended, constitutional rights are suspended, censorship is legalised and habeas corpus is abolished. Non-governmental political activity and freedom of movement is restricted, including street demonstrations, unapproved political organizations and unregistered financial donations. A special court is also established to overview crimes subject to its jurisdiction. The emergency law permits indefinite detention without trial and hearings of civilians by military courts, prohibits gatherings of more than five people, and limits speech and association. The government is empowered to imprison individuals for any period of time, and for virtually no reason.

Pro-democracy advocates in Egypt argued that the long-running states of emergency in Egypt go against the principles of democracy, which include a citizen's right to a fair trial and their right to vote.

== Overview ==
A total of five nationwide states of emergency have been declared since the Egyptian revolution of 1952.

- A state of emergency was first declared by Gamal Abdel Nasser during the 1956 Suez Crisis, before being lifted in 1964. During this period, a permanent emergency law was promulgated in 1958.
- The second state of emergency, the first invoked under the 1958 emergency law, lasted from the 1967 Six-Day War until 15 May 1980, when it was lifted by President Anwar Sadat.
- The third state of emergency was declared immediately following the assassination of Sadat in 1981, and was repeatedly extended every three years under President Hosni Mubarak. The legislation was extended in 2003 and was due to expire on 31 May 2006. In 2006, the Emergency Law was extended by two years though Mubarak had previously promised reforms including the repeal of the law to replace it with other measures, such as specific anti-terrorism legislation. The extension was justified by the Dahab bombings in April of that year. In May 2008 there was a further extension to June 2010, and again two years later to 2012, albeit with the government saying that it would be applied only to "terrorism and drug trafficking" suspects.

Mubarak's administration had cited the threat of terrorism in extending the state of emergency, claiming that opposition groups like the Muslim Brotherhood could come into power if the government did not forgo parliamentary elections, confiscate the groups' main financiers' possessions, and detain group figureheads, actions which would be virtually impossible without imposing emergency law and preventing the judicial system's independence. This has led to the imprisonment of activists without trial, illegal, undocumented and hidden detention facilities and the rejection of university, mosque and newspaper staff based on their political affiliation. Human rights organizations estimated that in 2010, between 5,000 and 10,000 people were in long-term detention without charge or trial. Some 17,000 people were detained under the law, and estimates of political prisoners were as high as 30,000.
During the 2011 Egyptian revolution, key demands by protesters included an end to the state of emergency. While Mubarak indicated he would repeal the emergency law, this was considered unsatisfactory and protests continued. After Mubarak resigned on 11 February 2011, power passed to the Supreme Council of the Armed Forces (SCAF) which stated that the law would be repealed when the streets finally clear of protesters. Instead, in September 2011, the SCAF amended a number of articles and added new ones to the emergency law, following the attack on the Israeli embassy in Cairo. On 24 January 2012, Muhammad Hussein Tantawy gave a televised speech in which he said that the state of emergency would be partially lifted the following day, except for cases of "thuggery". The state of emergency expired on 31 May 2012, two weeks before the second round of voting in Egypt's 2012 presidential election.

- Following the 2013 coup d'état, interim president Adly Mansour declared a one-month state of emergency on 14 August 2013 and ordered the Egyptian Armed Forces to help the Interior Ministry enforce security. The announcement made on state TV followed deadly countrywide clashes between supporters of deposed President Mohamed Morsi and the security forces. Following a two-month extension, the state of emergency was lifted in November 2013.
- The fifth state of emergency was declared following the Palm Sunday church bombings on 9 April 2017. The 2014 Constitution limited the duration of a state of emergency to three months, renewable once on ratification by a two-thirds majority in the House of Representatives. The government circumnavigated this limit by declaring a new three-month emergency period, which was to be approved by the rubber stamp parliament, immediately after the preceding one was due to expire. The 1958 emergency law was amended on request of the government in April 2020, amid the COVID-19 pandemic.

In October 2021, Sisi announced that the state of emergency would be lifted. The most recent extension beforehand occurred in July 2021. Trials under the supervision of the Emergency State Security Court, including that of activist Alaa Abd El-Fattah, nonetheless continued beyond the expiration of the state of emergency.

In addition, the SCAF imposed de facto martial law (extending the arrest powers of security forces) on 13 June 2012. The Justice Ministry issued a decree giving military officers authority to arrest civilians and try them in military courts. The provision remained in effect until a new constitution was introduced, and meant that those detained could remain in jail for that long, according to state-run Egy News.

President Abdel Fattah el-Sisi declared a local state of emergency in North Sinai Governorate in 2014, where the Egyptian Armed Forces continued to battle an ongoing jihadist insurgency.

== See also ==
- State of emergency
- History of Egypt under Hosni Mubarak
