= Mamdouh Shahin =

Egyptian military leader

Major General Mamdouh Shahin (Arabic: ممدوح شاهين) is an Egyptian soldier, politician and Assistant Defense Minister for Legal and Constitutional Affairs. He is a member of the Supreme Council of the Armed Forces (SCAF), and represents the military in the Constituent Assembly of Egypt.

== Biography ==
After Egyptian President Hosni Mubarak resigned in February 2011 is response to the Egyptian revolution, the Supreme Council of the Armed Forces (SCAF), a 20-member body made up of military leaders took power in Egypt. Two weeks later Shahin, along with Mohamed al-Assar and Mukhtar al-Mulla addressed Egypt on Dream TV in SCAF's first direct address to the public.

Shahin was appointed to SCAF in May 2011. Shahin rose to prominence due to his role as SCAF's legal and constitutional advisor. Many of SCAF's decrees came through his office. He was the military's representative to the Egyptian Constituent Assembly of 2012. Shahin had previously said in May 2011 that the military should have "some kind of insurance" under the constitution and insisted that it would not be subject to parliamentary scrutiny.

After the victory of Muhammad Mursi in the 2012 Egyptian presidential election, he retired 70 generals and kept only six members of SCAF, including Shahin. According to military analysts, the move was Mursi attempting to assert authority over the military.

Shahin and SCAF member Osama Al-Gindi were caught on audio recordings leaked to Muslim Brotherhood-aligned media outlets in December 2014. In a conversation with Abbas Kamel, Shahin and Gindi discussed fabricating evidence related to Mursi's trial.

By 2021, Shahin and Mohamed Hegazy Abdul Mawgoud were the only two military leaders who remained in their positions after the 2013 Egyptian coup d'état.
