= Mohamed Abbas Helmy =

Egyptian Air Marshal

Mohamed Abbas Helmy is an Egyptian Air Marshal. From 14 June 2018 to 4 October 2022 he served as Commander of the Egyptian Air Force. On retiring from the Air Force, in August 2022 Helmy was appointed by President Abdel-Fattah el-Sisi as the Minister of Civil Aviation, succeeding Mohamed Mannar.

Mohamed has been the chairman of the Homeland Defenders Party since 29 September 2025, following the death of General Galal Haridy in January 2025.

Military offices
Preceded by Younes Hamed	Commander of the Egyptian Air Force; 2018–2022	Succeeded by Mahmoud Foaad Abd El-Gawad
