= Mahmoud Shaker =

Egyptian Air Force air marshal

Mahmoud Shaker Abdel-Monem
- Born: 20 July 1926; Al Bidaa, Dakahlia Governorate
- Died: 6 April 1980 (aged 53)
- Military career
- Allegiance: Egypt
- Branch: Egyptian Air Force
- Rank: Air Marshal
- Conflicts: Libyan–Egyptian War

Air Marshal Mahmoud Shaker Abdel-Monem (Arabic: محمود شاكر) (20 July 1926 – 6 April 1980) was a senior commander in the Egyptian Air Force.

== Early life and education ==
Mahmoud Shaker was born on 20 July 1926 in Al Bidaa in the Dakahlia Governorate northeast of the Egyptian capital Cairo. He completed his secondary school education in 1947. Shortly afterwards, Mahmoud Shaker attended the Egyptian Military Academy, graduating in 1949. Moving on to the Egyptian Air Academy, Mahmoud Shaker graduated from flight training in 1950.

Mahmoud Shaker also studied:

- Air Navigation and Fighter Transformation Studies.
- M.A in the military sciences from the Indian Defence Services Staff College at the Wellington Cantonment.
- M.A in Air Sciences with a specialism in Air Defense.
- Higher level studies in military strategies from the Nasser Military Academy on the aviation instructor course.

== Egyptian Air Force career ==
During his junior officer years, Mahmoud Shaker served on fighter squadrons and at the Air Academy. He was appointed as a senior instructor at the Air Academy in 1961. Five years later, in 1966, he took up the post of Department Chief of Air Defense Operations in the Eastern Air Area. Only one year later, he became the Training Department Chief before becoming the Air Defense Operations Department Chief. It was around this time that Mahmoud Shaker was reassigned to the Central Area Air Defense. In 1968, he moved to the Air Force Operations Department before returning to the Air Academy as it Chief in 1969.

In 1972, Mahmoud Shaker was appointed as the Deputy Commander of the Egyptian Air Force. From 16 April 1975 to 6 April 1980, he was the Air Force Commander. During his time in command, the Egyptian Air Force saw action in the Libyan–Egyptian War. He also served as the Vice Defense Minister.

== Posthumous recognition ==
Mahmoud Shaker died on 6 April 1980 of a heart attack. In 2010, the 77th entry of the Air Force Academy was named after Mahmoud Shaker in recognition of his service to Egypt.

Military offices
Preceded by Hosni Mubarak	Director of the Egyptian Air Academy; 1969-1973	Succeeded by Ibrahim Shaker
Preceded by Hosni Mubarak	Commander of the Egyptian Air Force; 1975–1980	Succeeded by Mohamed Shabana
