= Reda Mahmoud Hafez Mohamed =

Egyptian politician

Minister of Military Production
- In office 16 July 2013 – 3 December 2013
- Preceded by: Abdul Fatah Al-Sisi
- Succeeded by: Abdel Fatah Al-Sisi

Commander of the Egyptian Air Force
- In office 20 March 2008 – 14 August 2012
- Preceded by: Magdy Galal Sharawi
- Succeeded by: Younes Hamed

Chief of Staff of the Egyptian Air Force
- In office 1 July 2007 – 20 March 2008

Personal details
- Born: 3 March 1952
- Died: 3 December 2013 (aged 61)
- Awards: Medal of Military Duty; Medal of Long Service and Good Leadership; Medal of Excellent service

Military service
- Allegiance: Egypt
- Branch/service: Egyptian Air Force
- Years of service: 1972–2012
- Rank: Air Marshal
- Commands: Chief of staff of Air Wing 242 (F-16) (1991–1992); Second-in-Command of Air Wing 232 (F-16) (1992–1994); 272 Wing Commander (F-16) (1994–1998); Liaison officer U.S.A (1998–2001); Deputy Chief of Armament Department (2001–2002); Deputy Commander of Air Force Academy (2002); Eastern Air Zone Chief of staff (2002–2003); Southern Air Zone Commander (2003–2004); Eastern Air Zone Commander (2004–2005); Chief of Training Department (2005–2007); Chief of operation Department (2007); Chief of staff of the 2007–2008 Egyptian Air Force; Commander of the Egyptian Air Force (2008–2013)
- Battles/wars: Yom Kippur War

Reda Mahmoud Hafez Mohamed (Arabic: رضا محمود حافظ; 3 March 1952 – 3 December 2013) was the commander of the Egyptian Air Force. Mohamed was also the minister for military production in the interim cabinet led by Prime Minister Hazem Al Beblawi.

== Biography ==
Reda Mahmoud Hafez Mohamed graduated from the Egyptian Air Academy in 1972 with a bachelor's degree in aviation and military Sciences. The following year he saw active service in the October or Yom Kippur War. He has flown several aircraft including the Aero L-29 Delfín, MiG-17, MiG-19, MiG-21 and the McDonnell-Douglas F-4 Phantom II.

In 1991, Mohamed was appointed Chief of Staff on the No. 242 Air Wing which flew the F-16 Fighting Falcon. This appointment was short lived and Mohamed took up post as Second-in-Command of No 232 Air Wing (also equipped with the F-16) in 1992. Two years later, Mohamed received a command appointment as the Commander of No. 272 Wing which was another F-16 unit.

After his extensive experience on F-16 units, Mohamed was posted to the United States as an Egyptian Air Force liaison officer. Returning to Egypt, Mohamed was appointed the Deputy Chief of Armament Department in 2001 followed by a brief spell as the Deputy Commander of the Air Force Academy in 2002. It was also in 2002 that Mohamed attended the High War College.

Now ready for higher command, Mohamed was the Chief of Staff at the Eastern Air Zone headquarters in 2002/03 before becoming the Southern Air Zone Commander in 2003. He became the Eastern Air Zone Commander in 2004 and was made the Chief of the Air Force's Training Department in 2005. On 1 July 2007 he became Chief of the Operations Department and towards the end of the year he was appointed Air Force Chief of Staff. Only three months later he replaced Magdy Galal Sharawi as the Commander of the Air Force, taking up his appointment on 20 March 2008. It was while Mohamed was in command that Air Force F-16s overflew the protesters in Tahrir Square during 2011 Egyptian revolution, although no attempt was made to attack the demonstrators.

Mohamed was a member of the Supreme Council of the Armed Forces which, after Hosni Mubarak had departed the presidency, has carried out the executive function within the Egyptian state. He was replaced by Younes Hamed as Commander of the Air Force in August 2012.

In July 2013 Hafez was appointed as Minister of Military Production by Hesham Qandil (Mohammed Morsi's Prime Minister). Hafez kept his ministerial position during and after the 2013 Egyptian coup d'état. In the Autumn of 2013 Hafez began to suffer from severe heart problems and he died at the International Medical Centre hospital on 3 December 2013.

Military offices
Unknown	Chief of Staff of the Egyptian Air Force; 2007–2008	Unknown
Preceded by Magdy Galal Sharawi	Commander of the Egyptian Air Force; 2008 – 2012	Succeeded by Younes Hamed
