= Lotfi Mustafa Kamal =

Egyptian Air Force commander (born 1952)

Air Vice-Marshal Lotfi Mustafa Kamal Mohamed Tawfik, commonly known as Lotfi Mustafa Kamal, (born 6 May 1952) (Arabic: لطفي مصطفى كمال) was the Egyptian Minister of Civil Aviation and a retired Egyptian Air Force commander.

== Personal life ==
Kamal entered the Egyptian Air Academy in 1970, graduating in 1972.

== Career ==
He was Chief of Staff of the EAF from 2009 to 2011.

== Notes ==
Military offices
Unknown	Chief of Staff of the Egyptian Air Force; 2009–2011	Succeeded by Yehya Hossain Abd ElHamed Hossain
Political offices
Preceded by Ibrahim Manaa	Minister of Civil Aviation; 2011–2012	Succeeded by Hussein Massoud
