= Ayman Lotfy =

Egyptian photographer

- Born: August 30, 1968 (age 57); Cairo, Egypt
- Known for: Fine-art photography
- Website: www.allotfy.com

Ayman Lotfy (born August 30, 1968) is an Egyptian fine art photographer.

== Early beginnings ==
Lotfy was born in Cairo, Egypt. In 1991, he graduated from the faculty of arts at the Ain Shams University. Lotfy started his career as a fashion designer and become a professional art director in 1996. In 1998, Lotfy began photography with the aim of enhancing his work as an art designer.

== Career and posts ==
Lotfy has been the Middle East Region Director of Photographic Society of America (RDPSA) since 2007. He earned a Fine Art Photography Associateship of The Malta Institute of Professional Photography (AMIPP) in 2010, and got his Fellowship in Fine Art Photography in 2014 (FMIPP), Associateship of the Society of Wedding & Portrait Photographers in 2010, and Egyptian Association for Photography.

He is an Honorary Fellow ICS-HON.F.ICS of The Image Colleague Society, International, USA.

== Art style ==
Lotfy mixes different tools of staging, painting, and lighting to produce fine-art photographs and videos. He utilizes technological trends in digital photography with filtering choices. Lotfy also integrates photography and video with large three-dimensional installations as in his work The search for salvation, which was shown at La Biennale di Venezia in 2010, and The Game at the Why not? Exhibition in The Palace of Arts-Opera House-Cairo in 2009.

== Awards ==
- 2008: Grand Photography Master Award at the China Jinan Contemporary International Photography Biennale, China
- 2010: Qilo International Photography Award at the China Jinan Contemporary International Photography Biennale, China
- 2010: Gold Medal of Excellence at the Experimental Photography Trierenberg Super Circuit in Austria
- 2010: 12th Cairo International Biennale in Egypt

== Publications ==
- Lofty, Ayman, ed. (2006). The other side of faces. Cairo: Alamia Publishing & Advertising.
- Lofty, Ayman, ed. (2009). Fine Art Photography. Cairo: Alamia Publishing & Advertising. ISBN 978-600-02-1344-2.
- Lotfy, Ayman (ed.) (2011). A Geminate- Experimental Photography
