= Lotfy El Tanbouli =

Egyptian painter and Egyptologist (1919–1982)

Lotfy El Tanbouli (13 February 1919, in Alexandria, Egypt – 11 May 1982) was a painter and Egyptologist.

== Biography ==
In 1946 he won his first award at the amateur exhibition in Paris. He held 13 individual exhibitions from 1946 to 1981 and participated in the collective exhibitions from 1964 to 1978.

Tanbouli obtained a state fellowship from the ministry of culture 1980-1981 and was founder member at the Syndicate of Plastic Artists.

Tanbouli was the first Egyptian to preside over the publication section at the Center of Documentation on Ancient Egypt. He was appointed as a resident archaeologist during the transferring of the two temples of Abu Simbel to higher ground (1964–1968).

He organized the first Negro festival in Dakar, the African art festival in Lagos, the exhibition of Ramses II in Paris (1976) and the ancient Egyptian Queens and Kings exhibition in Japan (1978). The Egyptian section of the military museum in Cairo and Port Said was organized by Tanbouli.

Publications: The complete scientific publication collection: The small temple of Abu Simbel (two parts). The scientific collection of the temples: Garf Hussein Temple, the second, the third and the fourth parts. The scientific booklets collection: dresses in ancient Egypt, Abu Simbel Temple, Kalabsha Temple and Garf Hussein Temple. He also wrote the scientific text for the catalogue of the ancient Egyptian queens and kings exhibition in Japan.

After he died, in December 1982, the ministry of culture inaugurated a retrospective exhibition of the artist Lotfy El Tanbouli at the art collective center in Zamalek. In May 1983, President Hosni Mubarak posthumously awarded him the science and art medal, first rank. In March 1984, the Cairo governmental Council named a street after him in Nasr City. In November 1985, the National Cinema Center presented a screening of a documentary film about the works of the artist Lotfy El Tanbouli entitled: «from Alexandria to El-Nuba», at the International Egyptian Cinema Festival. In April 1992, the ministry of culture held an exhibition for his works on the occasion of his tenth death anniversary at the Cairo Opera House. Most of his paintings are in private collections, also in a few Egyptian embassies around the world and in galleries in Egypt and in Poland. Lotfy El Tanbouli's nephew is the Alexandria painter Ibrahim El Tanbouli, and his great-nephew is the London-based painter Nazir Tanbouli.
