= Magdy Galal Sharawi =

Egyptian air marshal

- Born: May 1946 (age 80)
- Military career
- Allegiance: Egypt
- Branch: Egyptian Air Force
- Rank: Air Marshal

Air Marshal Magdy Galal Sharawi (Arabic: مجدي جلال شعراوي born May, 1946) is a retired senior Egyptian Air Force officer. From 2002 to 2008, he was the Commander of the Egyptian Air Force.

Magdy Galal Sharawi graduated from the Egyptian Air Academy in 1966. As a pilot he flew MiG-15s, MiG-17s, MiG-21s and SU-7s. From February 1997 to January 2000 he was the Director of the Egyptian Air Academy and in 2002 he was appointed as the Commander of the Egyptian Air Force. In late 2003, Sharawi visited Pakistan, meeting the Pakistani Chief of the Air Staff Air Chief Marshal Kaleem Saadat. Following a number of senior appointments he was made Commander of the Egyptian Air Force on 1 March 2002. Currently, he is an Ambassador Extraordinary & Plenipotentiary to Switzerland.

Military offices
| Preceded by Othman Abdel-Ghany Sakr | Director of the Egyptian Air Academy; 1997–2000 | Unknown |
| Unknown | Chief of Staff of the Egyptian Air Force ? – 2002 | Unknown |
| Preceded by Ahmed Shafik | Commander of the Egyptian Air Force; 2002–2008 | Succeeded by Reda Mahmoud Hafez Mohamed |
