= Supreme Council of the Armed Forces =

Statutory body of the Egyptian Armed Forces

The Supreme Council of the Armed Forces (SCAF; Arabic: المجلس الأعلى للقوات المسلحة, al-Maǧlis al-ʾAʿlā lil-Quwwāt al-Musallaḥa, also Higher Council of the Armed Forces) is a statutory body of between 20 and 25 senior officers of the Egyptian Armed Forces, and is headed by President Abdel Fattah еl-Sisi and Lieutenant General Abdel Mageed Saqr. The council is convened only in cases of war or great internal emergencies.

As a consequence of the 2011 Egyptian revolution, the SCAF assumed power to govern Egypt from departing President Hosni Mubarak on 11 February 2011, and relinquished power on 30 June 2012 on the inauguration of Mohamed Morsi as president.

== History ==
The SCAF has its origins in the Free Officers Movement, a clandestine body of anti-British Egyptian military officers in the late 1940s that seized power in a coup-cum-revolution in 1952. The officers organised themselves into the Revolutionary Command Council, which ruled Egypt as a junta until 1954, when a new Constitution was introduced, and a cabinet-style government was formed. The Revolutionary Council was dissolved by the dictator-turned President Gamal Abdel Nasser, who formed the Supreme Council of the Armed Forces in December 1954, as a statutory government body, comprising 25 senior-most military officers from the Army, Navy, Air Force and Air Defence Forces, with himself as the chairman of the body. The statute ruled that the council could not convene without the presence and approval of the president as the permanent chairman. The initiative for a meeting could only be started either by the president or the defence minister. Nasser intended to form this body mainly as a concession to the Army which had controlled Egypt through the Revolutionary Command Council since 1952. The SCAF was mandated to decide policy on all matters it deemed falling under the purview of "National Security". Thus, in Egypt the SCAF or more correctly the Air Force still handles the issuance of aviation licenses to private individuals and companies who want to operate any airborne vehicle in the country. Similarly, all private Radio station licenses are issued by the Army, while spectrum sale for mobile telephony are issued by the Air Defense Forces. For building hotels and resorts along beaches and coastal areas, investors need permission from the Navy. The idea of such a body of military officers guiding matters of State security probably came to nationalist officers through the Prussian and German Supreme War Council during World War I. However the scope of SCAF's licensing powers during peacetime allows it to wield wide economic and political influence.

The SCAF convened numerous times in 1956 during the Suez Crisis, during the Yemeni Civil War between 1964 and 1967, and throughout the period 1967 to 1974. Between 1967 and 1974, SCAF was composed of almost 25 senior officers, and totally controlled and planned Egypt's military policy regarding Israel. After 1974 the SCAF went into semi-permanent dormancy, until it was revived in 1981 after the assassination of President Anwar Sadat.

=== Role during 2011 revolution ===
During the course of the 2011 revolution, the Supreme Council of the Armed Forces met first on 9 February 2011 under the chairmanship of Egyptian president, Hosni Mubarak. The Council met for the first time without the chairmanship of the president on the following day, 10 February, and issued their first press statement which signaled that the council was about to assume power, doing so on 11 February after Mubarak's resignation. The military junta was composed of the following officers:

Portrait	Name (Lifespan)	Position
Chairman
	Field Marshal; Muhammad Hussein Tantawy محمد حسين طنطاوي سليمان (1935–2021)	Commander-in-Chief of the Egyptian Armed Forces Minister of Defense and Military Production Supreme Commander of the Egyptian Armed Forces
Deputy Chairman
	Lieutenant General; Sami Hafez Anan سامى حافظ عنان (born 1948)	Chief of Staff of the Egyptian Armed Forces
Members
	Air Marshal; Reda Mahmoud Hafez Mohamed رضا محمود حافظ (1952–2013)	Commander-in-Chief of the Egyptian Air Force
	Lieutenant General; Abd El Aziz Seif-Eldeen عبد العزيز سيف الدين (born 1949)	Commander-in-Chief of the Egyptian Air Defense Forces
	Vice Admiral; Mohab Mamish مهاب مميش (born 1948)	Commander-in-Chief of the Egyptian Navy

==== Prior to Mubarak's resignation ====
The Supreme Council released its first statement on Thursday, 10 February 2011, stating that the council "in affirmation and support for the legitimate demands of the people" is in "continuous session to consider what procedures and measures that may be taken to protect the nation". It was noted that Mubarak was not present in the meeting as the Supreme Commander of the Armed Forces, however the meeting was headed by defense minister Field Marshal Muhammad Hussein Tantawy.

==== Assuming power ====
The Supreme Council of the Armed Forces in its third statement issued on the evening of Friday, 11 February 2011, shortly after the announcement of Mubarak's resignation, stated that the Council is not a substitute for the legitimacy that satisfies the people. The Council addressed "with all the greetings and cherished for the lives of the martyrs who sacrificed their lives to sacrifice for freedom and security of their country, "and led a spokesman for the Council to salute the martyrs, an action which received wide praise from the people. The Council also thanked President Hosni Mubarak "for his work in the process of national war and in peace and on the national position in preference to the higher interest of the homeland" in the same statement. In the following day, 12 February, the Council released its fourth statement, which pledged to oversee the transition to ensure the transfer of power to a civilian government elected by the people.

==== Transition period and political reforms ====
In its statement the Council indicated that it intended to suspend emergency laws that had been in effect for three decades, move towards free and fair presidential elections, and provide for a safe transition to a free democratic order. One of their first actions was to dissolve the Parliament of Egypt, suspend the Constitution of Egypt, and an announcement of free, open presidential and parliamentary elections before the year's end and within six months. However, they have not yet lifted the emergency law and has failed to live up to is promises of civilian transfer of power and implementing the demands of the revolution.

The Council has also declared that Egypt "is committed to all regional and international obligations and treaties". This has been widely interpreted as relating to the Egypt–Israel peace treaty, and has been welcomed by Israeli Prime Minister Benjamin Netanyahu.

On 7 August 2011, Field Marshal Tantawi swore in 15 new governors, 11 of whom were new to the post. Some critics complained that the new governors were appointed rather than elected, that many of them were military figures and/or members of the old regime and none of them were young, women, or Copts.

Since taking power, the council oversaw the trial of 16,000 people in closed military trials, including bloggers, journalists and protesters. In May 2011, one of the members of the council, General Mamdouh Shahin, stated that under the new constitution Egypt's military should be given "some kind of insurance ... so that it is not under the whim of a president."

The SCAF was heavily criticized following violent confrontations in October 2011 between armed soldiers at the headquarters of the state television and radio services (known as the Maspero building). A group of protestors, mostly Coptic Christians, marched to the Maspiro building in downtown Cairo to protest against the burning of a church in Upper Egypt. A confrontation between the protestors and the army turned violent, resulting in the killing of over 20 protestors. State TV broadcast messages of Copts attacking the army and called on Egyptians to join the army. Armed men joined the army in attacking what had been a peaceful protest. The SCAF initially denied the army was responsible for any violence and further claimed that three soldiers had been killed by protestors, claiming that the soldiers were not carrying any live ammunition. Later, video evidence was broadcast showing army vehicles hitting groups of protestors. An editorial in The Washington Post blasted the SCAF for what it called a "shameful" response to the violence directed against the Coptic protestors.

Despite the turbulence of the transitional period in Egypt, polls have shown that the SCAF has enjoyed wide legitimacy from the Egyptian people and general confidence in their ability to provide free elections. A poll in October 2011 showed that 91.7% of Egyptians have confidence in the SCAF to provide the conditions for free elections. The SCAF at that time had a general approval rating of 40.6%.

On 24 January 2012, Mohamed Hussein Tantawi gave a televised speech in which he announced that the state of emergency would be partially lifted the following day. Power would be handed over to the government of the elected president in June 2012.

On 16 June 2012, just after the election of Muslim Brotherhood-affiliated Islamist candidate Mohamed Morsi as President of Egypt, the Supreme Council of the Armed Forces passed legislation which gave them control over the process of drafting a new constitution and immunity from any civilian oversight.

The council was dissolved on the inauguration of President Mohamed Morsi on 30 June 2012. The role of SCAF was transferred to the General Command of the Armed Forces.

=== Post-revolution ===
On 3 September 2012, Colonel General Abdel Fattah el-Sisi, newly appointed Minister of Defence and Commander-in-Chief of the Armed Forces, confirmed the composition of the revised command of the Armed Forces with the blessing of newly elected President Mohamed Morsi. The command was composed of the following officers:

Portrait	Name (Lifespan)	Position
Chairman
	Colonel General; Sedki Sobhy صدقي صبحي (born 1955)	Commander-in-Chief of the Egyptian Armed Forces Minister of Defense and Military Production
Deputy Chairman
	Lieutenant General; Mahmoud Hegazy محمود حجازى (born 1953)	Chief of Staff of the Egyptian Armed Forces
Members
	Vice Admiral; Osama El-Gendi أسامة الجندي (born 1953)	Commander-in-Chief of the Egyptian Navy
	Air Vice-Marshal; Younes Hamed يونس حامد (born 1959)	Commander-in-Chief of the Egyptian Air Force
	Lieutenant General; Abdul Meniem Al-Toras عبد المنعم التراس	Commander-in-Chief of the Egyptian Air Defense Forces
	Major General; Naser El-Aasy ناصر العاصي	Commander of the Second Field Army (HQ: Ismailia)
	Major General; Mohamed Raafat Eldash محمد رأفت الداش	Commander of the Third Field Army (HQ: Suez)
	Major General; Tawhid Tawfiq توحيد توفيق	Commander of the Central Military Region (HQ: Cairo)
	Major General; Gamal Shehata جمال شحاتة	Commander of the Northern Military Region (HQ: Alexandria)
	Major General; Mohamed Arafat محمد عرفات	Commander of the Southern Military Region (HQ: Asyut)
	Major General; Mohamed Al-Masry محمد المصري	Commander of the Western Military Region (HQ: Mersa Matruh)
	Major General; Nabil Al-Shazly نبيل الشاذلي	Chief of Operations of the Armed Forces
	Major General; Taher Abdullah طاهر عبدالله	Chief of the Armed Forces Engineering Authority
	Major General; Ahmed Ibrahim أحمد إبراهيم	Commander of the Border Guards Corps
	Major General; Ahmed Abou Al-Dahab أحمد أبو الدهب	Director of the Morale Affairs Department
	Major General; Mamdouh Shahin ممدوح شاهين	Assistant Minister of Defense for Constitutional and Legal Affairs Representative of the military in the Constituent Assembly Former assistant of Field Marshal Tantawy
	Major General; Mohamed Al-Assar محمد العصار	Assistant Minister of Defense for Armament Affairs Former assistant of Field Marshal Tantawy

== Current role ==
In 2014, Interim president Adly Mansour issued a presidential decree reconstituting the Supreme Council of the Armed Forces (SCAF) to be headed by the defense minister, instead of the president, who is constitutionally the Commander-in-Chief of the Egyptian Armed Forces. The council's vice president is the chief of staff. The council's new members included 23 top military generals from the army, navy, air force, air defence as well as the head of military intelligence.

The Constitution of Egypt includes a transitional article which gives the president the right to appoint the defence minister but also gives the SCAF the right to approve of its leader for eight years. Thus, this gives the SCAF a constitutional status, as it had operated as a statutory body since its inception. The defence minister decides which of his aides could also become council members. The president has the right to include members in the council as well as invite the council to meet whenever necessary. The president will head meetings that he calls. The defence minister invites the council for a regular meeting every three months and whenever urgently needed. In cases of a national threat or war, the council is considered in a continuous meeting.

Over twenty officers sat on the council as of early 2015. Based on Law No. 20, however, the defense minister may invite other experts to consult with the council or attend its meetings as he sees fit. So while the official SCAF membership may consist of these individuals, the law's flexibility leaves room for other officers—active or retired—to partake in the SCAF's deliberations, signaling the potential emergence of Egypt's newest men on horseback.

On 21 July 2020, the SCAF declared an exclusion zone between the Egypt–Libya border and a line drawn from the Libyan town of Sirte and the Al Jufra Airbase, promising intervention if GNA forces entered, which did so promptly leading to the Egyptian Parliament authorizing military intervention to protect the border.

== See also ==
- Emergency law in Egypt
