= Mohamed Sedky Mahmoud =

Commanding general of the Egyptian Air Force

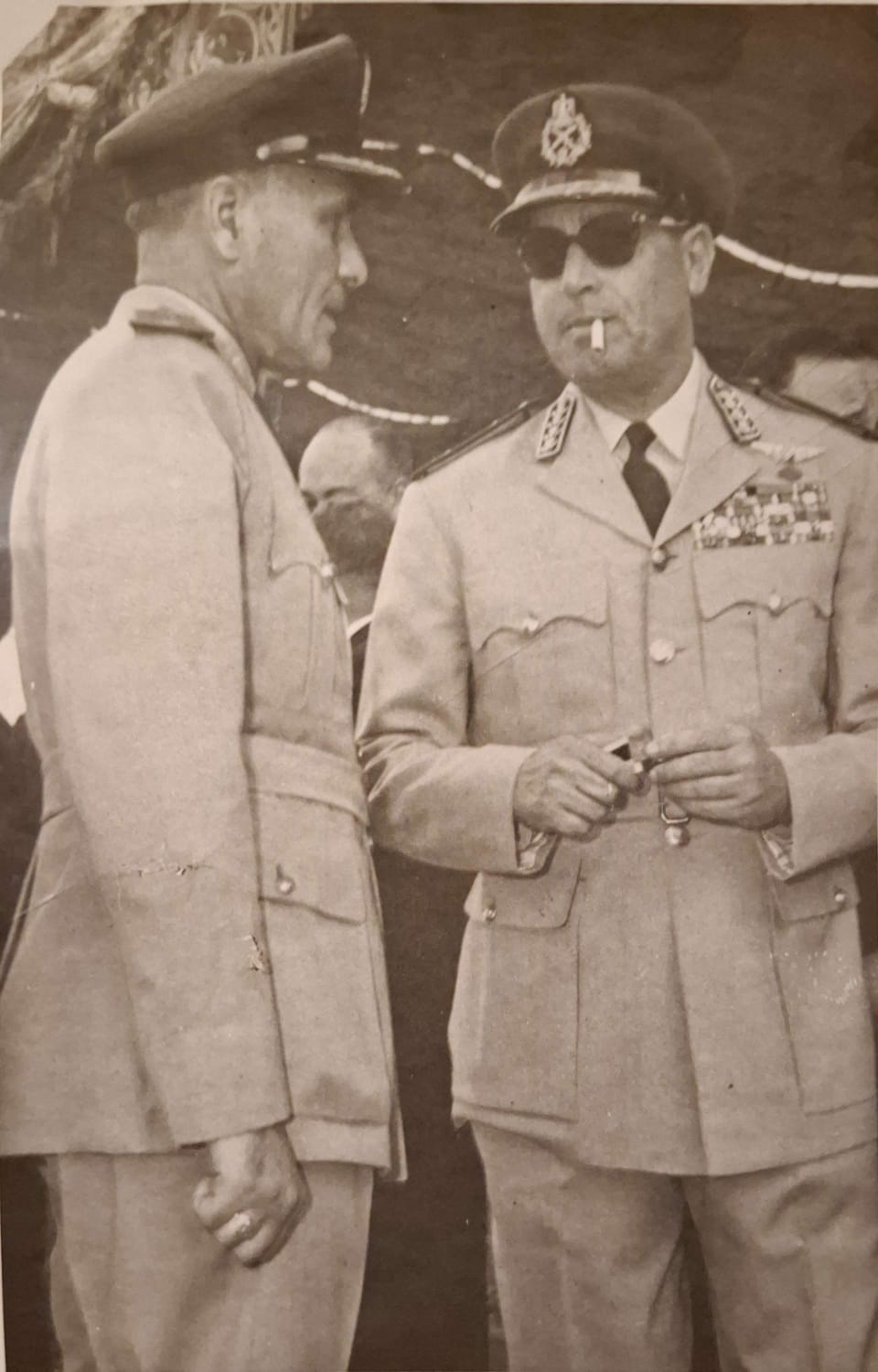

Mohamed Sidky Mahmoud (Arabic: محمد صدقي محمود, December 12, 1914 – 1984) was an Egyptian military leader. He served as Air Force Chief of Staff from June 23, 1953, to September 19, 1959, and as Air Force and Defense Commander from September 20, 1959, to June 11, 1967.

Sidky Mahmoud was born in Basandilah village, Daqahliah. He graduated from the Egyptian Military Academy in 1936 and studied at the Abu Swair Aviation School No. 4. He became the first Egyptian instructor in 1936, later became the lead aviation instructor, and headed the High Aviation School in 1944.

Sidky Mahmoud achieved the rank of Wing Commander and became head of the Dekhila Air Base in August 1949, and then Almaza Air Base in August 1951. He was promoted to 1st Lt. Gen. in 1952.

Air Marshal M Sidky Mahmoud was involved in the development of the Helwan HA-300.

During his tenure, he carried out official visits to the United States, India, Algeria, Iraq, Yemen, and Saudi Arabia. He took part in World War II, the 1948 Arab–Israeli War, the Tripartite Aggression, operations in Yemen in 1967, and the Six-Day War. During the Six-Day War, in 1967, he and the other senior Egyptian commanders, including Field Marshal Amer and General Anwar al-Qadi, were in a plane en route to Bir al-Thamada to inspect the troops stationed in the Sinai when the Israeli offensive Operation Focus began on the morning of 5 June. The bulk of Egypt's combat aircraft were destroyed in the attack.
