= Mohammad Manar Enabah =

Egyptian politician

Mohammad Manar Enabah is the minister of Civil Aviation of Egypt. Manar was managing the Egyptair Training Academy before becoming the minister. Under his leadership, the Egyptair Training Academy qualified at the International Civil Aviation Organization’s inspection test.
