= Mohammed Shabana =

Egyptian commander (born 1931)

Mohammed Lotfy Shabana (Arabic: محمد لطفي شبانة; born 31 March 1931) was a senior commander in the Egyptian Air Force, serving as its commander from 6 April 1980 to 15 April 1982.

At the end of March 1982, Shabana personally received six General Dynamics F-16 Fighting Falcon aircraft as part of an upgrade to Egypt's F-16 fighter squadrons.

Military offices
Preceded by Mahmoud Shaker	Commander of the Egyptian Air Force; 1980–1982	Succeeded by Abdel Hamid Helmy
