= Egyptian Air College =

College of the Egyptian Military Academy

Coordinates: 30.404°N 31.595°E

- Motto: Faith - Sacrifice - Glory الإيمان - التضحية - المجد
- Type: Military academy
- Established: 1951
- Affiliations: Egyptian Air Force
- Director: Air Vice-Marshal Walid Mohamed Abdel Salam Abdel Aty
- Location: Bilbeis, Sharqia Governorate, Egypt

The Egyptian Air College (Arabic: الكلية الجوية المصرية) is one of the colleges of the Egyptian Military Academy. It is a college in Bilbeis, Sharqia Governorate, Egypt, tasked with training officer candidates for the Egyptian Air Force. Established in 1951, the Egyptian Air College is one of seven military academies administered by the various branches of the Egyptian Armed Forces. The current director of the Egyptian Air Academy is Staff Air Vice-Marshal Walid Mohamed Abdel Salam Abdel Aty.

In addition to Egyptian Air Force personnel, the academy has also trained cadets from a large number of other Arab countries, as well as cadets from Malaysia and parts of Sub-Saharan Africa. It is considered one of Africa's prestigious military colleges, graduating competent officers capable of shouldering responsibility and confronting modern challenges in the field of aviation.

== History ==
Formal air force training in Egypt dates to 1938 when a forerunner to the Egyptian Air Academy was established on the grounds of the Royal Air Force-administered Almaza station near present-day Cairo International Airport. Resources provided to this school included instructors, technicians, training aircraft and curriculum. The first cadets were non-commissioned officers from the Egyptian Army and various police forces who were deemed medically fit for flying. This first school was divided into five "wings": Flying, Science, Technical, Cadets and Administration.

By 1951 the Almaza site had become inadequate for air force training purposes. That year a law was passed by the Kingdom of Egypt authorizing the creation of the Egyptian Air Academy near Bilbeis. Despite the Egyptian Revolution of 1952, the expulsion of British forces and the subsequent rise of the Republic of Egypt, plans for the academy remained unchanged, with construction and renovation continuing through 1961. Future Egyptian President Hosni Mubarak served as a lecturer and later as director of the Egyptian Air Academy at various times during the 1950s and 1960s

== Admission and curriculum ==
Prospective Egyptian Air College cadets must be Egyptian "by heredity from forefathers," unmarried, no older than 21 have "good manners" and be "clean living." Once at the academy cadets are divided into "pilot" and "navigator" groups. Curriculum includes theoretical and practical flying, administration and humanities, computer science and foreign languages.

Upon graduation both pilots and navigators receive bachelor's degrees, commissions in the Egyptian Air Force and certifications in their respective fields of study. Graduating pilots also receive an internationally recognized commercial pilot's license.

== Directors ==
The following senior officers have served as Director of the Air Academy:

- 1954 to 1961 Madkoor Abo-Alezz
- 1961 to 1963 Ali Hasan Emam
- 1963 to 1967 Abdel-Hamid Daghady
- 1967 Yahia Saleh Al-Aidaros
- 1967 to 1969 Hosni Mubarak
- 1969 to 1973 Mahmoud Shaker
- 1973 to 1974 Ibrahim Shaker
- 1974 to 1981 Abdel-Alim Ahmed Abdel-Alim
- 1981 to 1983 Ali Othman Zico
- 1984 to 1987 Fakhry Fadl-Alla Gahramy
- 1987 to 1989 Ahmed Abdellatif Ahmed
- 1989 Alaa Rahmy
- 1989 to 1990 Kamal Ezzat
- 1990 to 1993 Alaa Rahmy
- 1993 to 1997 Osama Abdel-Ghany Sakr
- 1997 to 2000 Magdy Galal Sharawi
- 2000 to 2013 unknown
- 2013 Abd-El Moneam Hassan Shouman

== See also ==
- Egyptian Air Defense College
- Egyptian Naval Academy
