= Special Forces Command (Cyprus) =

Combat arm of the Cypriot National Guard

- Διοίκση Καταρομών
- Active: 1964–present
- Country: Cyprus
- Allegiance: National Guard General Staff
- Type: Special Forces
- Role: Mountain warfare; Guerrilla warfare; Raiding; Reconnaissance; Airborne forces; Combat search and rescue
- Patron: Saint George
- Mottos: Ο Tολμών Nικά; O Tolmon Nika; Who Dares Wins
- Engagements: Cypriot intercommunal violence: Battle of Tillyria; Battle of Kophinou; 1974 Cypriot coup d'état: Battle of the Presidential Palace; Battle of the Broadcasting corporation; Battle of the Police headquarters-reserve corps; Battle of the Archdiocese; Turkish invasion of Cyprus: Battle of Nicosia Airport; Battle of KotsaKaya; Battle of Hill 126; Battle of Hill 1023; Battle of Pyrioi; 1978 Egyptian raid on Larnaca International Airport EgyptAir Flight 181

Commanders
- Current commander: Colonel Iakovos Papettas

The Special Forces Command (Greek: Διοίκηση Καταδρομών, romanized: Dioikisi Katadromwn) is a combat arm of the Cypriot National Guard. The primary mission of the Special Forces is unorthodox warfare and this is the purpose for which they began their training in 1964, primarily in the Troodos Mountains, while shortly after, they began operations against Turkish Cypriot rebels (TMT members) and the Turkish forces operating on the island.

== History ==
Prior to its formation in 1964, Cyprus had no central unorthodox/ special operations capability but rather had relied on remnants and teams that had either remained after EOKA was disbanded and to units such as Vassos Lyssarides' teams (Also known as the "Κοκκινοσκούφηδες", "Red berets" in English).

=== 1964-1974 ===
After the crisis in 1963, the Cypriot government introduced the Cypriot National Guard and in the summer of 1964 (July 9), the 31st Commando Battalion was formed and was based in Evrychou.

It took on its first mission in August 1964 during the Battle of Tillyria against the Turkish Armed Forces and TMT, eventually helping the then newly formed National Guard achieve its first victory but also losing its first 3 soldiers.

In September 1967, the 32nd Commando Battalion was formed in the Saittas region, in Troodos, and on the 30th of April 1965, the 33rd Commando Battalion was formed near Pedoulas.

In 1967, the special forces once again were called to action in an operation codenamed "Gronthos", with the aim of clearing the hills in and around the Kofinou village of all Turkish resistance, though an initial operational success, the command took 1 casualty and the political consequences of the operation were severe.

In December 1973, the 34th Commando Battalion was formed as a purely reserve component of the Special Forces Command.

During the 1974 Cypriot coup d'état, the Special Forces played a pivotal role, taking over all of their objectives including, the Presidential Palace, the broadcasting corporation, the Cyprus Police headquarters and its reserve corps and the Archdiocese.

On the 20th of July, when Turkey invaded Cyprus, the Special Forces took part in operations to clear the Kyrenia Mountains and specifically, Pentadaktylos, in an operation codenamed "Lavida" and also other operations such as the defense of Nicosia International Airport and defending various hills.

=== 1974-present ===
In 1978, after a hijacking at Larnaca International Airport, Egyptian special forces attempted a rescue operation in an attempt to mimic Operation Entebbe, however due to them not gaining permission from the Cypriot government, a gunfight ensued with the Cypriot special forces and other elements of the national guard, leading to the Egyptians suffering heavy casualties (36 killed or injured), a Lockheed C-130 Hercules and jeep also being destroyed.

After the Evangelos Florakis Naval Base explosion, commandos were sent to guard the area for a period of time.

In recent years, the Special Forces Command has increased its cooperation with countries such as Greece, Israel, France, Egypt and the United States with units such as:

- Greece – All SF units
- Israel – Egoz, Unit 669
- France – CPA 10
- Egypt – Special Forces
- United States – MARSOC, Navy SEALs

== Uniform and Insignia ==
All members of the Brigade wear the unit insignia depicting a winged sword, representative of the "deadly, silent and swift" nature of special forces operations. A scroll runs across the sword and wings with the motto "Who Dares Wins" (Greek: Ο Τολμών Νικά – O Tolmon Nika), a tribute to the Free Greek Special Forces that served with the 1st Special Air Service (1 SAS) Brigade during World War II. The unit flash is emblazoned with Greek: Δυνάμεις Καταδρομών, lit. 'Raider Forces'.

All Raiders wear the green beret with the Greek national emblem on the left.

== Gallery ==
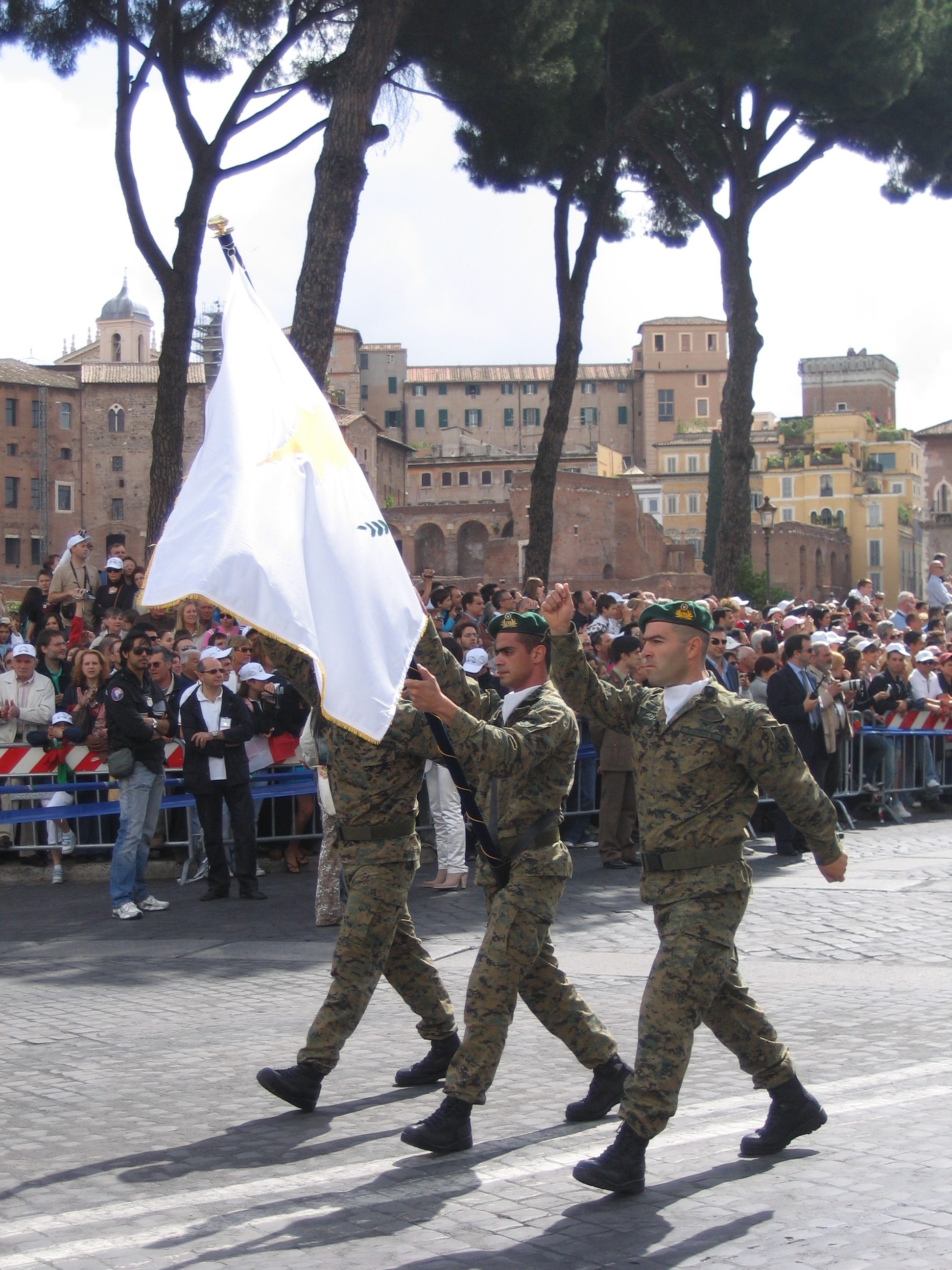
LOK officers marching at Republic Fest Military Parade in Italy, 2007.

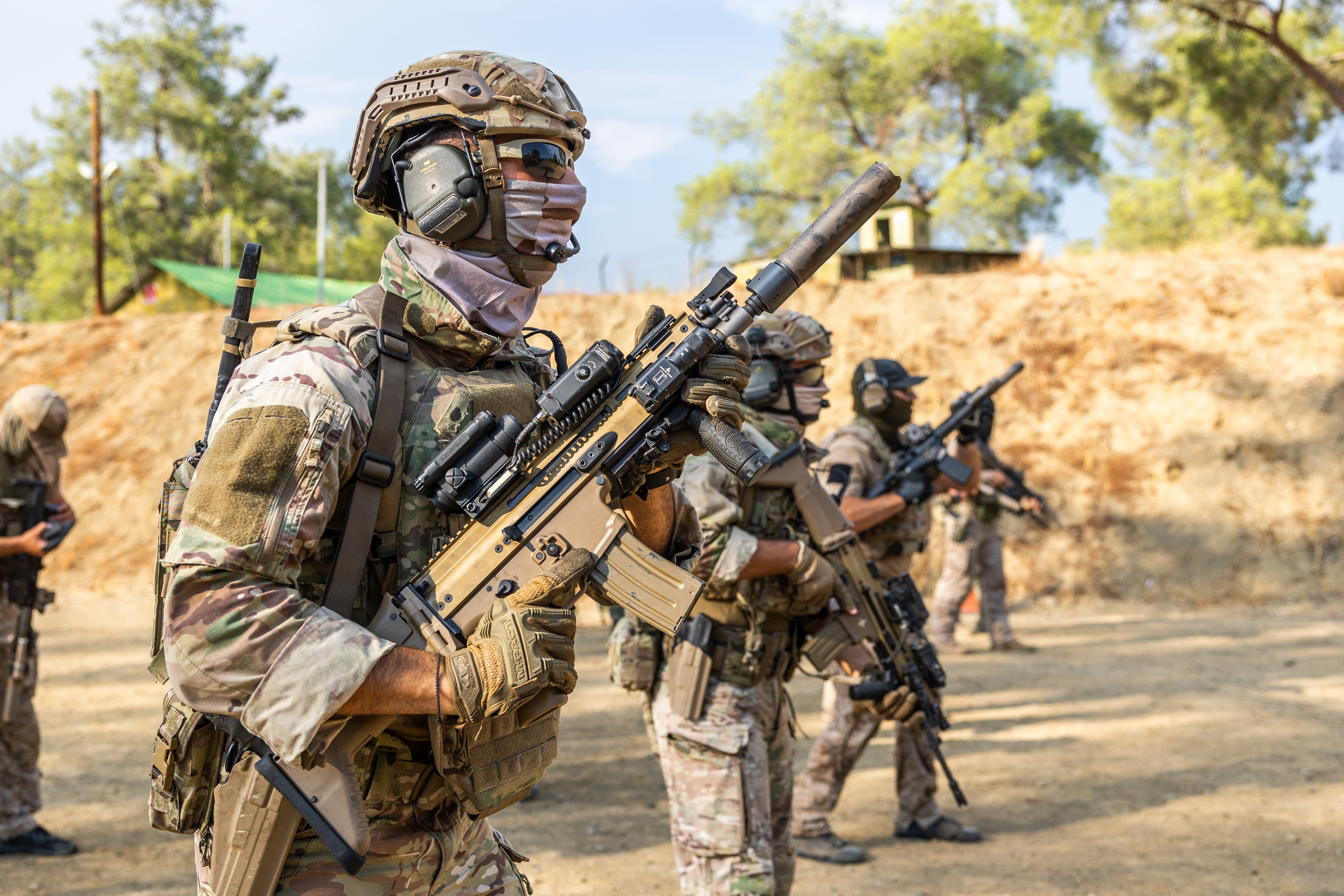
SF operator with his FN SCAR-L rifle.

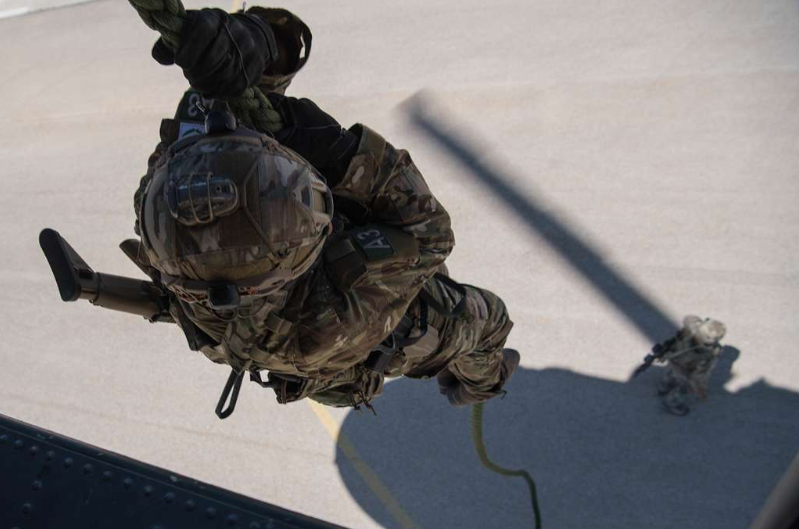
SOF operator fast-roping from a heli during Eager Lion.

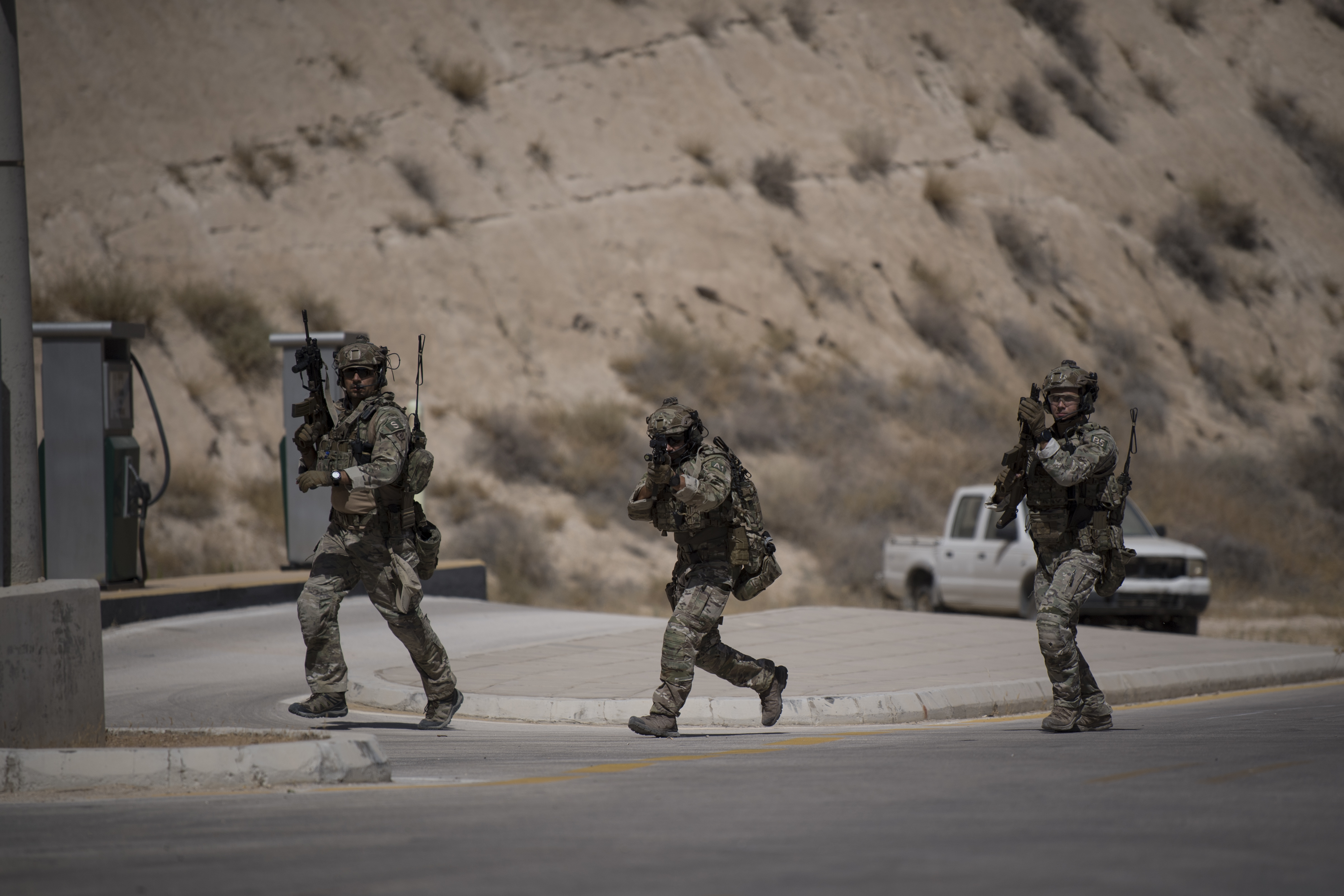
Cypriot Special Forces during fire and movement drills.

Special Forces unit flash that is emblazoned with ΔΥΝΑΜΕΙΣ ΚΑΤΑΔΡΟΜΩΝ (Raider Forces).

== See also ==
- Cypriot National Guard
- Battle of Tillyria
- Turkish invasion of Cyprus
- Cyprus Police
- Mobile Immediate Action Unit
