= Nabil Shukri =

Egyptian military officer (1930-2019)

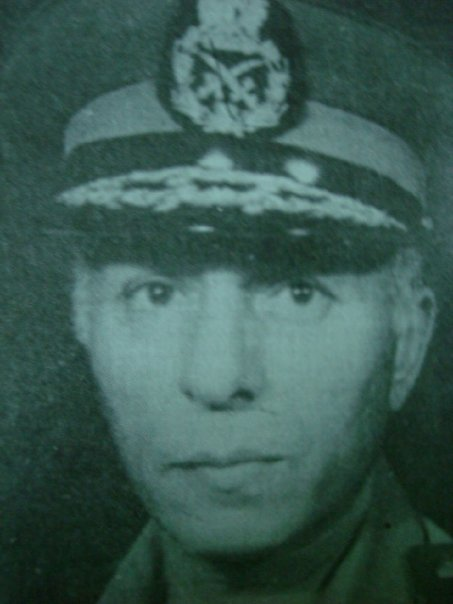
- Native name: نبيل شكري
- Born: 24 October 1930; Cairo, Kingdom of Egypt
- Died: 15 June 2019 (aged 89) Cairo, Egypt
- Branch: Egyptian Army: Egyptian Infantry Corps (6th Infantry Battalion); Egyptian Airborne Corps; El-Sa'ka Forces
- Rank: Major general
- Conflicts: Suez Crisis; Six-Day War; War of Attrition; Yom Kippur War; Egyptian raid on Larnaca International Airport
- Education: Egyptian Military College (1948–1950)

Nabil Shukri (Egyptian Arabic: نبيل شكري; 24 October 1930 - 15 June 2019) was the commander of the El-Sa'ka Special Forces Corps during the War of Attrition and the Yom Kippur War; He joined the Military College in 1948 and graduated in 1950. He then joined the Sixth Infantry Battalion, then joined the Airborne Corps, then the El-Sa'ka Forces.

== Career ==
Major General Nabil Shukri participated in all of Egypt's modern wars since the Suez Crisis of 1956, then the Six-Day War of 1967, then the War of Attrition and finally the Yom Kippur War of 1973. He assumed the chief of staff of the El-Sa'ka Forces after June 1967, and during his leadership he carried out a number of operations that inflicted heavy losses on Israel.

Major General Nabil Shukri was the commander of the Egyptian El-Sa'ka Forces, to which some military engineers were attached to build missile bases for the purpose of repelling the Israeli raids on Egypt. It was part of the Egyptian army's preparations for the Yom Kippur War in 1973, and his office manager was Farouk Abdel Hamid el-Feki, the spy who was relaying news of the Egyptian preparations up to date. Those platforms were struck immediately after the completion of construction work, and that spy was the fiancé of the well-known spy Heba Selim. When Major General Nabil Shukri learned of the betrayal of his office director, he resigned from his position, but President Anwar Sadat refused his resignation, so Major General Nabil Shukri asked to be part of the team that executed the death sentence on that spy.

He was appointed by a decision of President Sadat as Director of the Military College after the Larnaca International Airport operation in Cyprus, because Major General Shukri was opposed to that operation that was planned to take place at the Cyprus airport without notifying the Cypriot authorities because this would be a military assault with serious consequences, but he carried out President Sadat's orders, and he was the leader of the group. Which was sent by President Sadat to Cyprus to arrest the killers of Youssef el-Sibai. This operation is known as the Egyptian raid on Larnaca International Airport in 1978.

He died on July 15, 2019, at the age of 89.
