= Hatem Saber =

Egyptian army officer

Hatem Abdul Fatah Saber
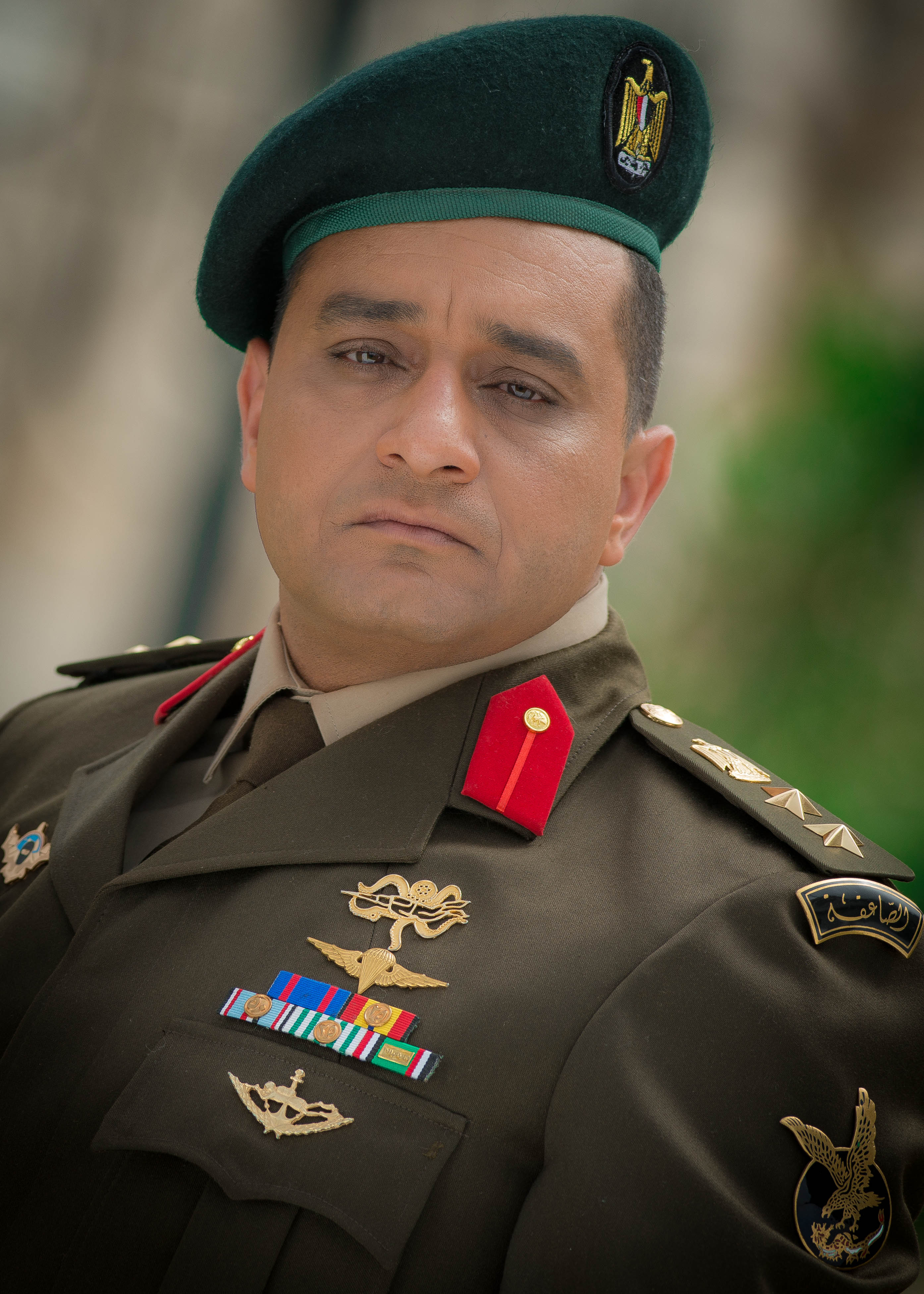
- Born: 1969 (age 56–57)
- Military career
- Branch: Egyptian Army
- Service years: 1989– 2013
- Rank: Colonel
- Commands: Unit 777 Unit 999

Hatem Abdul Fatah Saber, formerly known as The Unknown Commander, was an Egyptian Army Colonel, who served as the commander of Unit 777 and the Unit 999 Egypt's most important military units. Previous to this assignment Saber served as the Supervisor of the Egyptian military special unites. Colonel Saber was known as the unknown commander due to his position's secrecy after appearing in military photos wearing a mask. His military career was ended in 2013 after multiple injuries. Currently, he serves as an adviser to the minister of defence, Colonel General Sedki Sobhi. On October 29, 2022, Dr. Mahmoud Shawky El-Meteini, President of Ain Shams University, assigned Hatem to be the Supervisor of the General Administration of University Security. Saber was honored by President Adly Mansour.

== Career ==
=== Military education ===
- Bachelor of military science from the Egyptian Military Academy; specialization: Infantry-Sa'ka.
- Sa'ka course.
- Airborne course.
- Frogmen course.
- Counter-International terrorism course.
- Intelligence course.
- Negotiating with terrorists course.
- Securing VIPs course.

=== Main Command Positions ===
- Chief of operations, Unit 777.
- Chief of operations, Unit 999.
- Military Intelligence and reconnaissance officer.
- Supervisor, The Egyptian military special unites.
- Martial Arts' Trainer, Special forces of Egypt.

=== Awards ===
- Military Duty Decoration, First Class.
- 25 January medal.
