= Unit 999 =

Special forces unit in the Egypt Army

- الوحدة 999 قتال
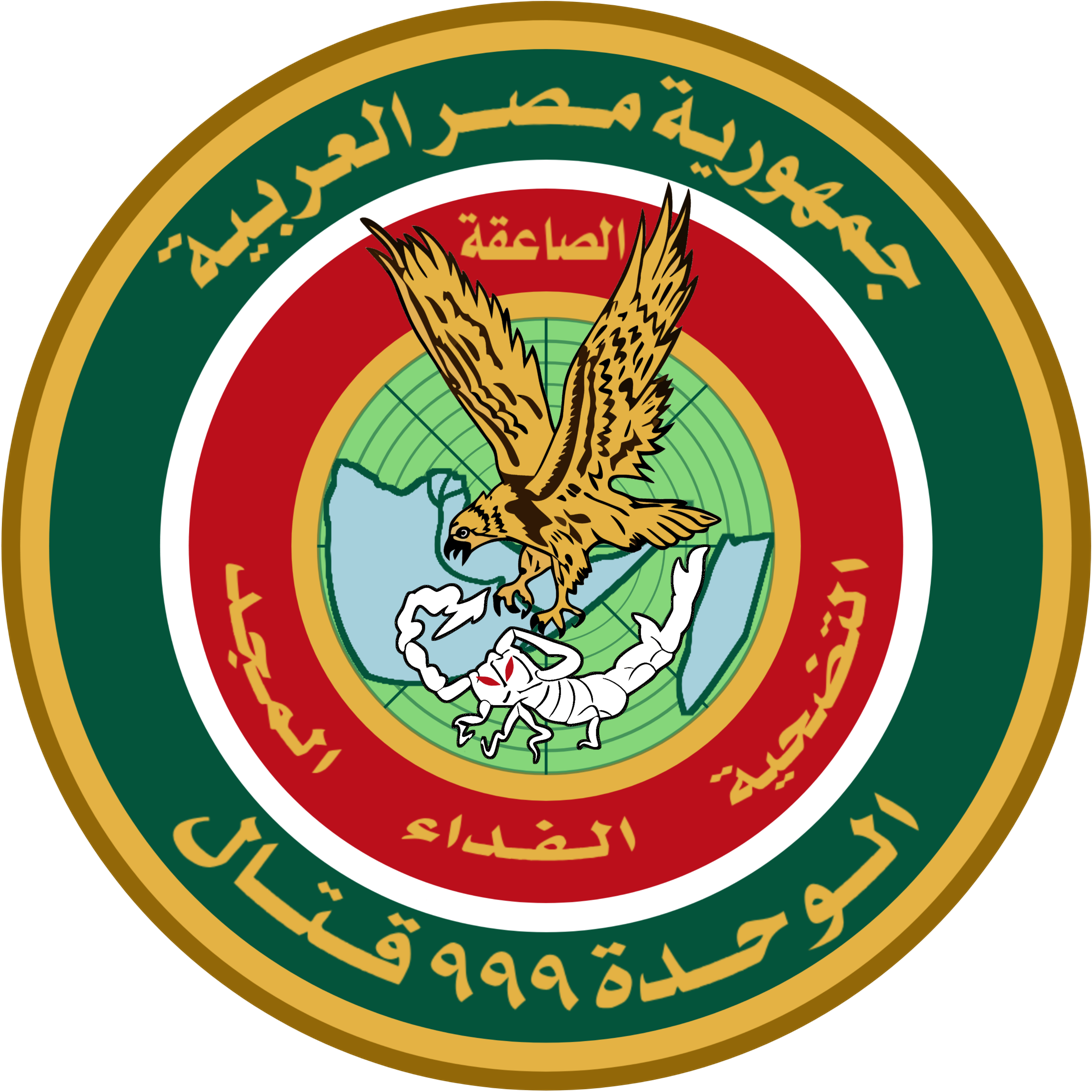
- Official emblem
- Country: Egypt
- Allegiance: Egyptian Armed Forces
- Branch: Egyptian Army
- Type: Special operations forces
- Role: Special operations
- Size: Classified
- Part of: El-Sa'ka Forces
- Garrison/HQ: Southern Cairo
- Motto: Victory or Martyrdom
- Mascot: The Eagle of Thunderbolt

Commanders
- Current commander: Classified
- Notable commanders: Hatem Saber

Unit 999 (Arabic: الوحدة 999 قتال), also known as Task Force 999, is a special operation force in the Egyptian Army, falling under the El-Sa'ka Forces. Unit 999 participated in a joint training event at Fort Campbell, Kentucky hosted by the United States Army's 5th Special Forces Group (Airborne) that focused training them on special operations tactics and procedures.

== See also ==
- Unit 777
- Hostage Rescue Force
