= Flight 321 =

Flight 321 may refer to:

- QuebecAir Flight 321, hijacked on 14 December 1972
- EgyptAir Flight 321, hijacked on 23 August 1976
- Asian Spirit Flight 321, accident on January 2, 2008
- Singapore Airlines Flight 321, encountered severe turbulence on May 21, 2024
