= EgyptAir Flight 181 =

2016 aircraft hijacking in Cyprus

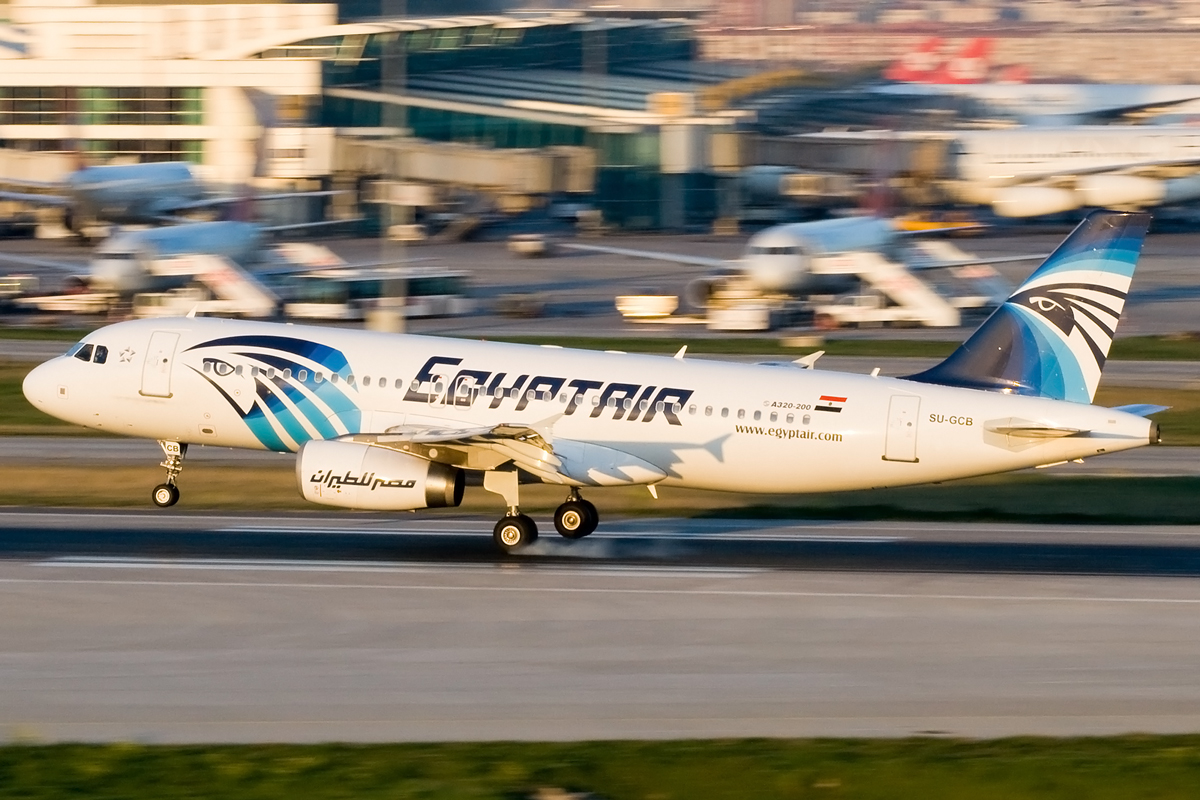
- SU-GCB, the aircraft involved in the hijacking seen in 2010

Hijacking
- Date: 29 March 2016
- Summary: Hijacking
- Site: Larnaca International Airport, Larnaca, Cyprus

Aircraft
- Aircraft type: Airbus A320-233
- Operator: EgyptAir
- IATA flight No.: MS181
- ICAO flight No.: MSR181
- Call sign: EGYPTAIR 181
- Registration: SU-GCB
- Flight origin: Borg El Arab Airport, Alexandria, Egypt
- Destination: Cairo International Airport, Cairo, Egypt
- Occupants: 63
- Passengers: 56
- Crew: 7
- Fatalities: 0
- Survivors: 63

EgyptAir Flight 181 was a domestic passenger flight from Borg El Arab Airport in Alexandria, Egypt, to Cairo International Airport. On 29 March 2016, the flight was hijacked by an Egyptian man claiming to wear an explosive belt and forced to divert to Larnaca International Airport in Cyprus. Most passengers and crew were released by the hijacker shortly after landing. The hijacker surrendered about seven hours later, and everybody escaped from the aircraft unharmed. The belt was later revealed to have contained mobile phones and no explosives. The aircraft involved in the incident was an EgyptAir Airbus A320.

== Hijacking ==
Flight 181 departed Borg El Arab Airport in Alexandria at 06:38 local time (UTC+2) for a short flight to Cairo International Airport, carrying 56 passengers plus seven crew. After takeoff, the captain was informed that a passenger claiming to be wearing an explosive belt was demanding that the aircraft be flown to Cyprus. A passenger later reported that, during the flight, the flight attendants collected the passengers' passports. The plane then started gaining altitude, and it was announced that they were diverting to Larnaca. The aircraft safely landed at Larnaca International Airport at 08:46 local time (UTC+3), and stopped in a remote parking area. The airport was then closed to all incoming and outgoing traffic.

== Resolution ==
After landing at Larnaca, negotiations began and everyone on board was freed except three passengers and four crew. The hijacker later demanded to see his estranged wife, living in Cyprus, and sought asylum in the country. He also gave police a letter addressed to his former wife. Cypriot state media said that the hijacker wanted the release of female prisoners in Egypt, and, according to Egyptian officials, he had been asking to speak to European Union officials.

Seven more people later exited the plane via the stairs, and a crew member climbed down from a cockpit window. At 14:41 local time, the Cypriot foreign ministry tweeted that the hijacking was over, and the hijacker had been arrested. None of the passengers or crew were harmed. In an earlier tweet, the ministry identified the hijacker as Seif Eldin Mustafa, an Egyptian national.

Later in the day, a photo was circulated of a passenger seen smiling beside Mustafa, whose supposed explosive belt was visible underneath his coat. The passenger was later identified as Ben Innes, and the photo went viral. Innes later stated that he simply wanted "a chance to get a closer look" at the supposed explosive device to determine whether the device was real.

== Passengers and crew ==
There were six Egyptian crew members and one Egyptian security official aboard Flight 181. Of the 56 passengers, 30 were Egyptian, 14 were European, and 8 were from the United States. Opera singer Farrah el-Dibany was a passenger on this flight.

== Aircraft ==
The aircraft involved was a 12-year-old Airbus A320-233 registered as SU-GCB, MSN 2079. The aircraft was equipped with two IAE V2500 engines.

== Perpetrator ==
After being detained, Seif Eldin Mustafa was held in custody in Cyprus. The government of Egypt and Cyprus stated their intentions for him to be extradited for prosecution in Egypt. A legal process took place in Cyprus as a court order is required for extradition. An original verdict in support of extradition was appealed by Mustafa, on the grounds of human rights risks in Egypt. Mustafa was eventually extradited to Egypt, where he was tried, convicted, and sentenced to life imprisonment.

== See also ==
- EgyptAir Flight 321 – EgyptAir flight hijacked in 1976
- EgyptAir Flight 648 – EgyptAir flight hijacked in 1985
- EgyptAir Flight 804 – Another EgyptAir A320 aircraft; it crashed less than two months after this A320 was hijacked.
- Afriqiyah Airways Flight 209 – Afriqiyah Airways flight hijacked in 2016
- Egyptian raid on Larnaca International Airport – failed Egyptian attempt to intervene in a hostage stand-off at Larnaca International Airport in 1978
- List of aircraft hijackings
- Accidents and incidents involving the Airbus A320 family
