= EgyptAir Flight 648 =

1985 aircraft hijacking in Malta

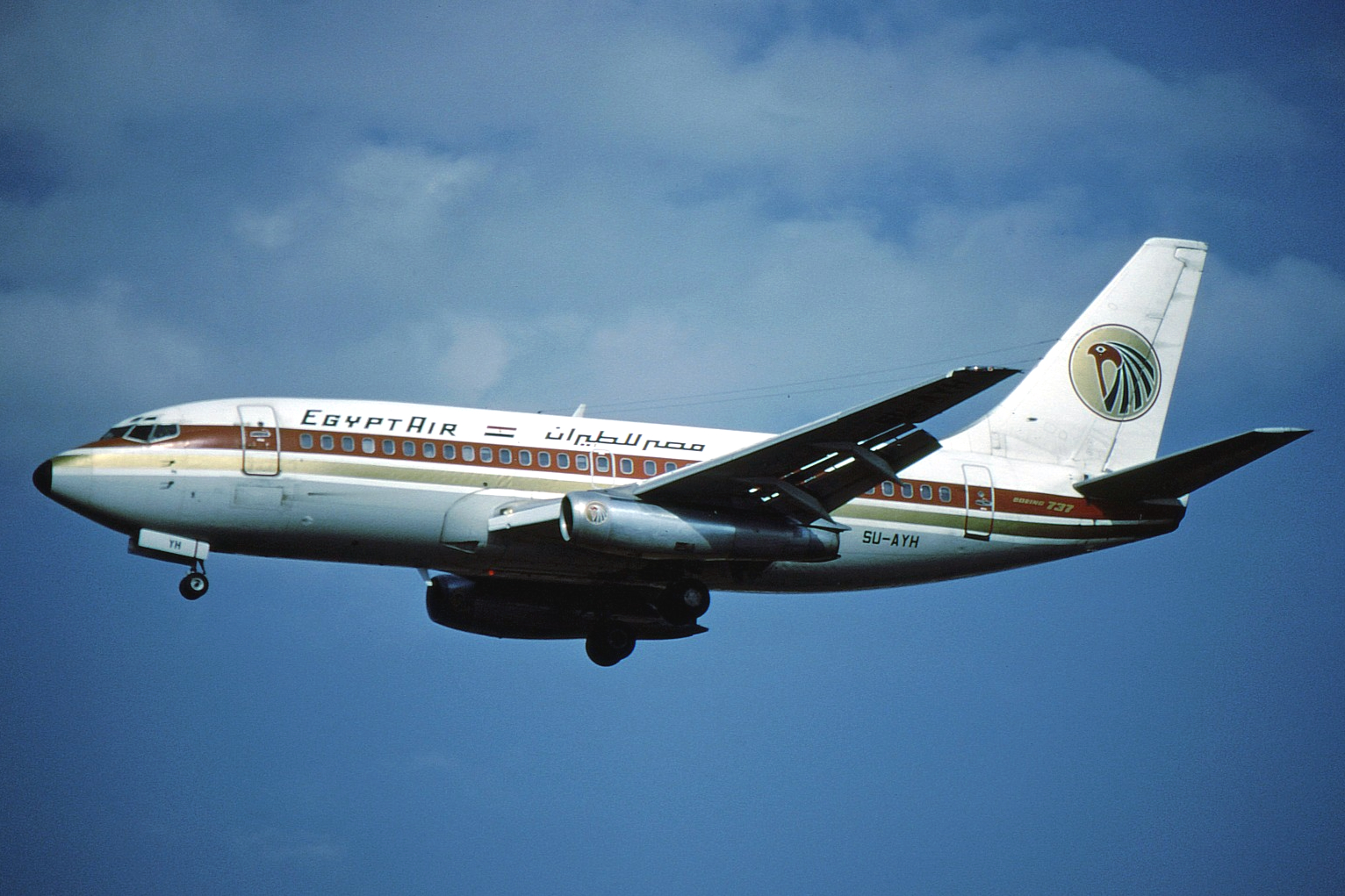
- SU-AYH, the aircraft involved in the hijacking, pictured in 1984

Hijacking
- Date: 23–24 November 1985
- Summary: Hijacking
- Site: Luqa Airport, Luqa, Malta; 35°51′27″N 014°28′39″E

Aircraft
- Aircraft type: Boeing 737–266
- Operator: EgyptAir
- Registration: SU-AYH
- Flight origin: Athens (Ellinikon) Int'l Airport
- Destination: Cairo International Airport, Cairo, Egypt
- Occupants: 98 (including 3 hijackers)
- Passengers: 92 (including 3 hijackers)
- Crew: 6
- Fatalities: 60 (including 2 hijackers)
- Injuries: 34
- Survivors: 38 (including 1 hijacker)

EgyptAir Flight 648 was a regularly scheduled international flight between Athens Ellinikon International Airport (Greece) and Cairo International Airport (Egypt). On 23 November 1985, a Boeing 737-200 airliner, servicing the flight was hijacked by the Palestinian terrorist organization Abu Nidal. The subsequent raid on the aircraft by Egyptian troops killed 56 of the 86 passengers, two of the three hijackers and two of the six crew.

== Aircraft ==
The aircraft involved was a nine-year-old Boeing 737–266, MSN 21191, registered as SU-AYH, that was manufactured by Boeing Commercial Airplanes in 1976. It was equipped with two Pratt & Whitney JT8D-17 engines.

== Hijacking ==
On 23 November 1985, Flight 648 took off at 8 pm on its Athens-to-Cairo route. Ten minutes after takeoff, three Palestinian members of Abu Nidal hijacked the aircraft, the same group also responsible for the hijacking of Pan Am Flight 73 a year later. The terrorists, declaring themselves to be Egyptian revolutionaries by the intercom, were well armed with guns and grenades.

The terrorists' commander, Salem Chakore, proceeded to check all passports while Omar Rezaq went to the cockpit to change the aircraft's course. At the same time, Chakore had the European, Australian, Israeli, and American passengers sit in the front of the aircraft while the rest, including the Greeks and Egyptians were sent to the back. Chakore saw an Australian passenger, Tony Lyons (aged 36), holding a camera. Believing Lyons had taken a picture of him, Chakore took the camera and ripped the film out before slamming the camera into the wall. Chakore came to an Egyptian Security Service agent, Methad Mustafa Kamal (aged 26), who reached into his coat as if to pull out his passport. Instead, he withdrew a handgun and began shooting, killing Chakore; he subsequently engaged in a shootout with the other hijacker, Bou Said Nar Al-din Mohammed (Nar Al-Din Bou Said). Nineteen shots were fired until Kamal and two flight attendants were wounded by Rezaq. In the exchange of fire the fuselage was punctured, causing a rapid depressurization. The aircraft was forced to descend to 14,000 feet (4,300 m) to allow the crew and passengers to breathe, with the oxygen masks deploying.

Libya was the original destination of the hijackers, but due to a lack of fuel, damage from the shootout and negative publicity, Malta was chosen. While approaching Malta the aircraft was running dangerously low on fuel, experiencing serious pressurization problems and carrying wounded passengers. However, Maltese authorities did not give permission for the aircraft to land; the Maltese government had previously refused permission to other hijacked aircraft, including on 23 September 1982 when an Alitalia aircraft was hijacked on its way to Italy. The hijackers insisted, and forced the pilots Hani Galal and Imad Mounib (both aged 39) to land at Luqa Airport. As a last attempt to stop the landing, the runway lights were switched off, but the pilot managed to land the damaged aircraft safely after permission to land was eventually granted.

== Nationalities ==
Breakdown of passengers and crew by nationality as per New York Times. A notable passenger was actress Lupita Pallás, who, with her daughter Laila, were among the fatalities.

Nationality	Passengers	Crew	Total
Australia	2	0	2
Belgium	1	0	1
Egypt (including 3 air security officers)	30	6	36
Greece	17	0	17
Palestine	11	0	11
Philippines	16	0	16
United States	3	0	3
Canada	2	0	2
Israel	2	0	2
Mexico	2	0	2
Spain	1	0	1
Ghana	1	0	1
France	1	0	1
Other (hijackers)	3	0	3
Total	92	6	98

== Standoff ==
At first, Maltese authorities were optimistic they could solve the crisis. Malta had good relations with the Arab world, and 12 years earlier had successfully resolved a potentially more serious situation when a KLM Flight 861, a Boeing 747–200, landed there under similar circumstances. The Maltese Premier, Karmenu Mifsud Bonnici, rushed to the airport's control tower and assumed responsibility for the negotiations.

The remaining two hijackers allowed medics and engineers to examine the injured and the damage to the airplane, respectively. The medics confirmed that the commanding hijacker, Salem Chakore, was dead while the sky marshal that killed him, Kamal, was still alive. In a rage, Omar Rezaq, who assumed command of the hijacking, shot Kamal again as he was led off the plane. Somehow, Kamal survived. The doctor told Rezaq the sky marshal was dead and was able to remove him from the airplane.

Aided by an interpreter, Bonnici refused to refuel the aircraft, or to withdraw Maltese armed forces which had surrounded the plane, until all passengers were released. Sixteen Filipino and 16 Egyptian passengers and two injured flight attendants were allowed off the plane. The hijackers then started shooting hostages, starting with Tamar Artzi (aged 24), an Israeli woman, whom they shot in the head and back. Artzi survived her wounds. Assuming command of the hijacking, Rezaq threatened to kill a passenger every 15 minutes until his demands were met. His next victim was Nitzan Mendelson (aged 23), another Israeli woman, who died a week later after being declared brain dead. Mendelson realized what was to happen so she resisted. Rezaq grabbed her by the hair and led her out onto the staircase before shooting her. While tossing Mendelson's body down the stairs, he noticed Artzi move. He shot her through the back from the top of the stairs. Again, Artzi survived her wounds. He then targeted three Americans, having their hands tied behind them.

After the shooting of Mendelson, Maltese soldiers surrounded the airplane. Spotting them from the cockpit window, Rezaq demanded that the soldiers be withdrawn. Negotiators told him he had no choice but to surrender. Rezaq was informed that if the plane left Malta, American jets based in Italy would intercept and shoot down the plane. This enraged Rezaq.

By intercom, Rezaq had a flight attendant call forward Patrick Scott Baker (aged 28), an American fisherman-biologist on vacation. Rezaq stepped back when Baker locked eyes with him as he came forward. Tony Lyons, an Australian passenger who could see the stairs platform from his window seat later stated that he saw that Rezaq had to raise his gun in order to shoot Baker. The bullet grazed Baker's skull after he moved it at the last second but played dead. Rezaq pushed his body down the steps. Baker waited a few minutes before making a run for it, hands still tied behind his back.

Fifteen minutes later, Rezaq called for Scarlett Marie Rogenkamp (aged 38), a U.S. Air Force civilian employee. Making her kneel on the staircase, Rezaq shot her in the back of the head, killing her instantly. Her body was later taken to a hospital, where she was identified by Baker.

Jackie Nink Pflug (aged 30) wasn't shot until the next morning. Of the five passengers shot, Artzi, Baker and Pflug survived; Mendelson died in a Maltese hospital a week after the hijacking after being declared brain dead. For five hours, Pflug drifted in and out of consciousness until an airport grounds crew retrieved her body on its way to the morgue. They discovered she was still alive and rushed her to the nearby hospital.

Because Rezaq's gun was defected, some of his victims survived his executions. He realised this at a late stage and eventually swapped his gun with Bou Said.

France, the United Kingdom, and the United States offered to send anti-hijack forces. Bonnici was pressured by the hijackers, the United States' and Egypt's ambassadors, who were all at the airport. The non-aligned Maltese government (Mifsud Bonnici was a staunch advocate for what he called Malta's "neutrality') feared that the Americans or the Israelis would arrive and take control of the area, as the U.S. Naval Air Station Sigonella was only 20 minutes away. A U.S. Air Force C-130 Hercules with an aeromedical evacuation team from Rhein-Main Air Base (2nd Aeromedical Evacuation Squadron) near Frankfurt, Germany, and rapid-deploying surgical teams from Wiesbaden Air Force Medical Center were on standby at the U.S. Navy Hospital at Naples.

A listening device was offered by the United States ambassador but was refused initially because Mifsud Bonnici did not want U.S. military aircraft to land on Malta. Eventually it was accepted as long as it arrived on an Italian military plane, but it never arrived in time for the storming. When the U.S. told Maltese authorities that Egypt had a special forces counterterrorism team trained by the U.S. Delta Force ready to move in, they were granted permission to come. The Egyptian Unit 777 commanded by Major-General Kamal Attia was flown in, with four American officers. Negotiations were prolonged as much as possible, and it was agreed that the airplane should be attacked on the evening of 25 November when food was to be taken into the aircraft. Soldiers dressed as caterers would jam the door open and attack.

A crucial step that arguably had an integral role in the outcome of the raid was when the Maltese government decided to separate three high-ranking US officers from the Egyptian commandos. They had all arrived together from Cairo but Malta wanted the Americans to stay out of the storming. Two US officers were under house arrest in the US embassy and one was held in the Army barracks incommunicado.

== Raid ==
Without warning, Egyptian commandos began the raid about an hour and a half before it had been planned originally. They planted plastic explosives in the cargo hold and then shot indiscriminately inside the aircraft through windows from both wings. Fifty-two passengers – including pregnant women and children – suffocated from the fumes that enveloped the aircraft when the soldiers placed a bomb underneath the fuselage to break into the hold. Another five were shot dead by the commandos. During the storming no passengers were killed by the actions of the two remaining hijackers. Bou Said was incinerated immediately because of the explosion placed by the commandos. Rezaq managed to survive after suffering some injuries. According to Dr Abela Medici, two kilograms of highly-explosive Semtex were used, which provided more power than was necessary to allow the commandos safe entry into the airplane. Abela Medici stated that these explosions caused the internal plastic of the airplane to catch fire, causing widespread suffocation. An unverified source reports that when the hijackers realized they were being attacked, they lobbed hand grenades into the passenger area, killing people and igniting the fire aboard. However, this allegation is not consistent with Dr Abela Medici's forensic report.

The storming of the aircraft killed 54 of the remaining 87 passengers, as well as two crew members and one hijacker. Only one hijacker — Omar Rezaq, who had survived — remained undetected by the Maltese government. Rezaq came out of the cockpit only to be shot in the chest by a commando, throwing a grenade as he went down and severely injuring a commando. Captain Galal claims he subsequently tried to attack Rezaq with the cockpit axe, but Rezaq managed to escape from the aircraft. (The New York Times reported at one point, however, that the hijackers' commander shot Captain Galal, grazing his forehead, and Captain Galal hit the hijacker with an axe, then Egyptian soldiers shot the hijacker.) However forensic reports show no blood marks were found on the axe. None of the Egyptian commandos were killed but one had a leg blown off.

Rezaq removed his hood and ammunition and pretended to be an injured passenger. Egyptian commandos tracked Rezaq to St Luke's General Hospital and, holding the doctors and medical staff at gunpoint, entered the casualty ward looking for him. He was arrested when Australian passenger Anthony Lyons who was recovering in the hospital recognized him.

Rezaq was tried in Malta, but with no anti-terrorism legislation, he was tried on other charges. There was widespread fear that terrorists would hijack a Maltese airplane or perform a terrorist attack in Malta as an act of retribution. Rezaq received a 25-year sentence. For reasons unclear, Maltese authorities released him some seven years later, in February 1993, and allowed him to board an airplane to Ghana. His release caused a diplomatic incident between Malta and the U.S. because Maltese law strictly prohibits trying a person twice, in any jurisdiction, on charges related to the same series of events (similar to but having wider limitations compared to classic double jeopardy).

Rezaq's itinerary was to take him from there to Nigeria, and then to Ethiopia, and finally to Sudan. Ghanaian officials detained Rezaq for several months, but eventually allowed him to proceed to Nigeria. When Rezaq's airplane landed in Nigeria, Nigerian authorities denied him entry into the country and handed him to FBI agents departing for the United States. He was brought before a U.S. court and, on 8 October 1996, sentenced to life imprisonment with a no-parole recommendation.

== In popular culture ==
The events of the hijacking were related in an account by American survivor Jackie Nink Pflug, who had been shot in the head, on the Biography Channel television program I Survived..., which was broadcast on 13 April 2009. Laurence Zrinzo, the neurologist and neurosurgeon who established neurosurgery as a subspecialty in the Maltese islands, performed Pflug's neurosurgical procedure. She related details about the flight and the attack in her 2001 book, Miles To Go Before I Sleep. The incident was chronicled and reenacted in an Interpol Investigates episode, "Terror in the Skies", broadcast by the National Geographic Channel.

The hijacking is recounted in detail by survivors and eyewitnesses in the Declassifed episode, "Terror in the Sky: To Catch a Hijacker."

The hijacking is also the subject of the book Valinda, Our Daughter, written by Canadian author Gladys Taylor.

The events of the hijacking are described in and used to further the plot of Brad Thor's novel, Path of the Assassin.

A similar situation appeared in the 1999 movie Mummy by Russian director Denis Yevstigneyev. This is a movie based on the hijacking of Aeroflot Flight 3739 in 1988.

In 2025 the transcripts of the radio communications between the control tower and the plane were published in the book Sovereign, The Untold Story of the 1985 Egyptair hijacking in Malta by journalist Malcolm Scerri Ferrante.

== See also ==
- EgyptAir Flight 181 – EgyptAir flight hijacked in 2016
- EgyptAir Flight 321 – EgyptAir flight hijacked in 1976
- Egyptian raid on Larnaca International Airport
- List of aircraft hijackings
