= Omar Rezaq =

Palestinian murderer (born 1957 or 1958)

Omar Rezaq

Omar Mohammed Ali Rezaq (né Omar Marzouki; born 1957/1958) is a Lebanese-born Palestinian militant who is the lone surviving hijacker of EgyptAir Flight 648 in 1985. He was a member of Abu Nidal Organization. The plane was hijacked by a group of three people. The remaining two hijackers were killed, either during in-flight shooting with the plane's sky marshal, Methad Mustafa Kamal, or after Egyptian commandos stormed the hijacked plane.

== Early life and activities ==
Rezaq gave his name as Omar Marzouki and used a Tunisian passport when boarding the plane at Athens airport, but later admitted that he is of Palestinian origin. The FBI determined that Omar Marzouki was his real name, while "Omar Mohammed Ali Rezaq" was an alias, as its initials (O.M.A.R.) made the name easy to remember.

During hours of negotiations while the plane was on the ground at Luqa airport in Malta, Rezaq shot five passengers, three of whom survived. On 24 November 1985, Egyptian commandos set explosives that ignited a fire, suffocating many of the passengers. Rezaq was wounded in a subsequent shootout (his left lung was pierced by a bullet and attacked with a hatchet by the pilot), but recovered and was arraigned in a Maltese court on 12 December 1986. The preliminary inquiry lasted until 3 April 1987, and on 2 November 1988, Rezaq pleaded guilty to seven of the nine charges against him. These were the illegal arrest of crew and passengers, the deaths of Nitzan Mendelson and Scarlett Marie Rogenkamp, the attempted killings of Methad Mustafa Kamal, Patrick Scott Baker, Jacqueline Nink Pflug and Tamar Artzi, and the illegal possession of arms and explosives. The first two charges were later withdrawn. Rezaq was sentenced to the maximum 25 years' imprisonment, less the years and months he had already spent in prison. On appeal, the sentence was confirmed on 20 April 1989.

Rezaq served only seven years in Malta and was released. As a free man under an assumed name, he went to Accra, Ghana where, at the request of the American Embassy Regional Security Officer Jerald H. Barnes, he was detained by the Ghana government and remained there until July 1993.

== Travel to Nigeria ==
Ghanaian authorities did not give Rezaq to the United States but told them that he planned to go to Nigeria. Rezaq flew to Lagos in July 1993; U.S. intelligence officials were on board his flight to monitor him. He was arrested and underwent extraordinary rendition by members of the DSS, who flew him to the U.S. Rezaq's arrest was the result of an agreement between the governments of the United States and Nigeria. When Rezaq arrived at the airport, Nigerian officials denied him entry since he did not have a passport, something they knew beforehand, and placed him on the first aircraft departing Nigeria, a Gulfstream IV leased by the U.S. government. FBI agents arrested him, fingerprinted him, and flew back to the U.S.

On 19 July 1996, after a month-long trial in Washington, D.C., Rezaq was sentenced to life in prison on a single count of air piracy. Although air piracy resulting in death is a capital offense under federal law, Attorney General Janet Reno had declined to seek the death penalty.

== Later life ==
U.S. District Court Judge Royce C. Lamberth recommended that any request for parole made after the 10-year period should be rejected. An appeal was rejected on 6 February 1998. Rezaq was denied parole in 2023.

Omar Mohammed Rezaq, register number 20267-016, is imprisoned at the United States Penitentiary, Marion, located in Southern Precinct, Williamson County, Illinois.
