= Unit 777 =

Special forces unit in the Egyptian army

Unit 777 Combat
- الوحدة 777 قتال
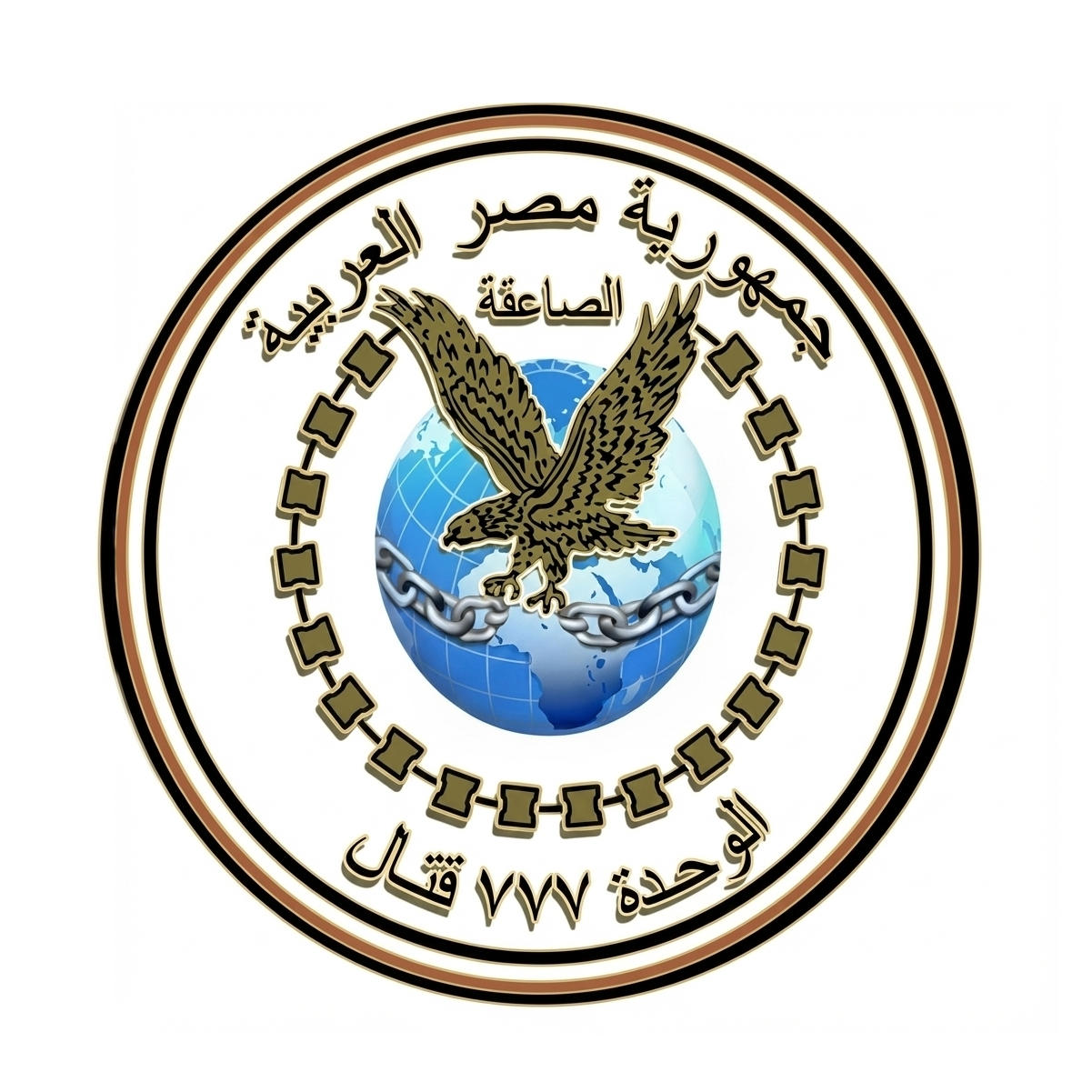
- Official emblem
- Active: 1978 – present
- Country: Egypt
- Allegiance: Egyptian Armed Forces
- Branch: Egyptian Army
- Type: Special operations forces
- Size: Classified
- Part of: El Saa'qa Forces
- Garrison/HQ: Southern Cairo
- Mascot: The Eagle of Thunderbolt
- Engagements: EgyptAir Flight 321; EgyptAir Flight 648; Larnaca International Airport Raid; Operation Eagle

Commanders
- Current commander: Classified
- Notable commanders: Hatem Saber

Aircraft flown
- Helicopter: Westland Sea King Commando; Sikorsky UH-60 Black Hawk; Mil Mi-8; CH-47 Chinook

Unit 777 (Arabic: الوحدة 777 قتال), also known as Task Force 777, is a special forces unit in the Egyptian Army, falling under the El-Sa'ka Force. They specialize in black operations, commando style raids, counterterrorism, executive protection, hostage rescue, irregular warfare, manhunting, and special operations in behind enemy lines. It was created in 1978 by the government of Anwar Sadat in response to concerns of increased terrorist activity following the expulsion of Soviet military advisors from the country by Sadat and his efforts to achieve peace with Israel.

== Creation ==
In 1978, Egyptian Army Special Forces were dispatched to Larnaca International Airport, Larnaca, Cyprus in response to the hijacking of a Cyprus Air passenger aircraft by operatives of the Popular Front for the Liberation of Palestine (PFLP). Cairo merely informed Cypriot president Kyprianou that "people are on the way to help rescue the hostages" and did not reveal who was on board nor what their intentions were. Upon landing in Cyprus, the Egyptian force immediately launched an all-out assault, dispatching a single Jeep all-terrain vehicle with three men to race ahead of an estimated 58 troops (another report has this figure at 74) moving towards the hijacked aircraft on foot. As the Egyptian troops advanced quickly towards the hijacked DC-8 aircraft and the Cypriot special forces who surrounded it, the Cypriot special forces reportedly issued a single verbal warning to halt and submit, though in other reports, the Cypriots issued two verbal warnings, the second demand for the Egyptians to return to their aircraft. As this occurred, the occupants of the Jeep and the Cypriot operators exchanged gunfire, and the Egyptian Jeep was struck by a rocket propelled grenade (RPG), as well as gunfire, killing all three occupants. As the vehicle came to a halt, the Cypriots and the main Egyptian force confronted each other at a range of less than 300 metres (330 yd), and it is variously reported that the Egyptians, who lacked any form of cover, dropped down onto the tarmac in prone firing positions. At this moment, the two forces engaged each other with heavy gunfire, and the Cypriots opened fire on the Egyptian C-130H aircraft with a 106 mm anti-tank missile, striking it in the nose and killing the three crew on board.

With their aircraft destroyed, the Egyptian force and the Cypriot special forces exchanged heavy gunfire for nearly an hour in sporadic fighting on the open tarmac. Some of the Egyptian troops took cover in a nearby empty Air France aircraft.

Kyprianou, who was watching the events unfolding from the airport control tower, was forced to withdraw from the windows and take cover as Egyptian commandos shot at the tower with automatic gunfire. Of the Egyptian commando force, 15 men were killed, in addition to three crew of the C-130H Hercules transport aircraft who were killed when it was struck by a missile. An estimated 15 more Egyptian commandos were reported to have been taken injured to Larnaca General Hospital with gunshot wounds. No fatalities of Cypriot commandos were recorded. Following the assault, it emerged that the surrender of the two hostage-takers had already been secured at the time of the failed Egyptian attack, and the two men were taken prisoner by the Cypriots and later extradited to Egypt, where they received death sentences, later commuted to life sentences.The aftermath of the failed night-time incident and the need of a professional counter-terrorism unit in Egypt resulted in the creation of Unit 777.

== EgyptAir Flight 321 ==
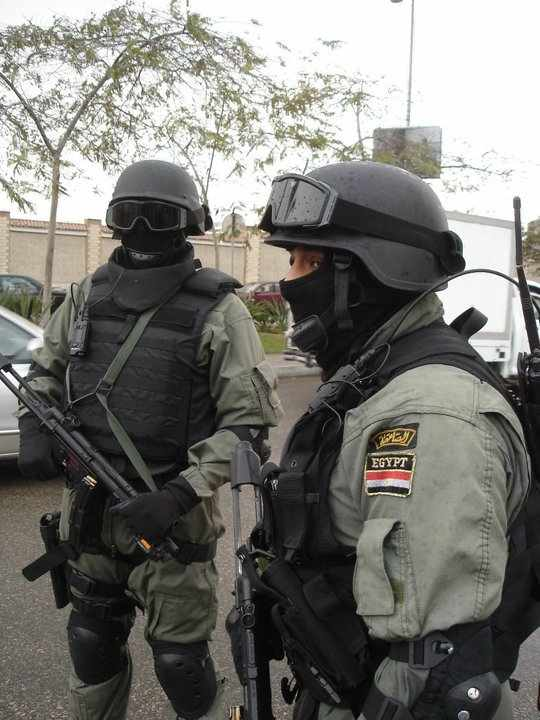
Unit 777

On August 23, 1976, three armed terrorists claiming to be from the Abd Al-Nasir Movement hijacked the EgyptAir Flight 321, a Cairo-Luxor flight, and asked the pilot to land in Tripoli. One of the three hijackers was a 21-year-old Palestinian, Mohammed Naguid, who was working in Kuwait. They demanded the release of five Libyans imprisoned in Cairo in connection with two assassination attempts. The context was the deterioration of relations between Egypt and Libya after the Yom Kippur War due to Libyan opposition to Sadat's peace policy. There had been a breakdown in unification talks between the two governments, which subsequently led to the Libyan-Egyptian War. Fifteen minutes after takeoff from Cairo International Airport, an Italian pilot called the airport to report that he had received a beam aerial from the Egyptian aircraft heading to Luxor that it had been hijacked and the flight was under terrorist control.

President Sadat ordered the Prime Minister and the Minister of Defense to make the necessary decisions to protect the passengers and arrest the terrorists. The Prime Minister and the Minister of Defense quickly flew to Luxor International Airport where they started a secret meeting in the airport's tower, while Major General Abdul Hafiz Al-Bagori, Governor of Qena started negotiations with the three terrorists in order to gain time. During a call between the cockpit and the airport, the pilot complained about a problem in the aircraft - that it had not shown that the aircraft needing refuelling - and that the aircraft needed maintenance. The terrorists were persuaded to allow the aircraft to land in Luxor for refuelling. Negotiations continued until 3 p.m., when the governor told the terrorists that engineers were ready. The engineers were two disguised Sa'ka officers, who went inside and outside the aircraft several times in order to appear to be maintenance workers. Minutes later three officers stormed the aircraft and captured the hijackers.

The force that stormed the aircraft was later announced to be a special unit within the Sa'ka Forces and further information was classified, the same force which was later named 777.

== EgyptAir Flight 648, 1985 ==
In 1985, Unit 777 was dispatched again to deal with a hijacking, this time to Malta. An Egypt Air Boeing 737 (EgyptAir Flight 648) had landed in Luqa Airport under the control of Abu Nidal faction terrorists, purportedly as retaliation for Egypt's failure to protect the terrorists that had hijacked the MS Achille Lauro earlier that year. Although the operation was planned more carefully this time, the TF 777 operators committed several mistakes that would eventually prove fatal to many of the hostages. As explosives were detonated to attempt to blow a hole on the top of the airframe, the explosion ripped through the cabin area, immediately killing 20 passengers. Using the same hole, the operators gained entry to the plane but in the confusion opened fire indiscriminately and killed and injured more passengers. In the ensuing chaos, passengers that managed to flee the plane were then gunned down by snipers in positions around the airport who mistook them for terrorists attempting to escape. The total number of passengers killed was 57, out of 88 total.

== Op-Global Sky ==
External videos
- Footage of Op-Global Sky

On June 3, 1998, in response to the departure of the ship Global Sky from Suez without paying port fees it owed, the Suez Canal Authority asked the Egyptian Armed Forces to intervene. The Egyptian Armed Forces decided to send Unit 777 along with naval forces to deal with the ship in international waters. Unit 777 used a Commando helicopter to descend on the main deck, capturing the whole crew without damaging the vessel.

== Current status ==
After the outcomes of their first two major operations, Unit 777 was temporarily disbanded, and formed again later to deal with internal threats. The unit is currently located in southern Cairo and is equipped with Mi-8 helicopters. The unit actively trains with a number of Western special operations groups, including the United States Army's Delta Force, United States Navy's SEAL Team Six, and the French GIGN.

== Firearms ==
- Switzerland: SIG P226
- Germany: Heckler & Koch USP
- United States: M1911 pistol
- Iraq: Beretta M1951
- Germany: Heckler & Koch MP5
- Germany: Heckler & Koch G36
- Soviet Union/Egypt: Misr assault rifle - Locally made Egyptian rifle.
- Switzerland: SIG SG 550
- Italy: Beretta ARX160
- Germany: SIG Sauer SSG 3000
- Russia: Orsis T-5000

== See also ==
- Hatem Saber
- EgyptAir Flight 648
- Egyptian raid on Larnaca International Airport
- Egyptian Sinai war on terror
