= Airborne Forces (Egypt) =

- قوات المظلات
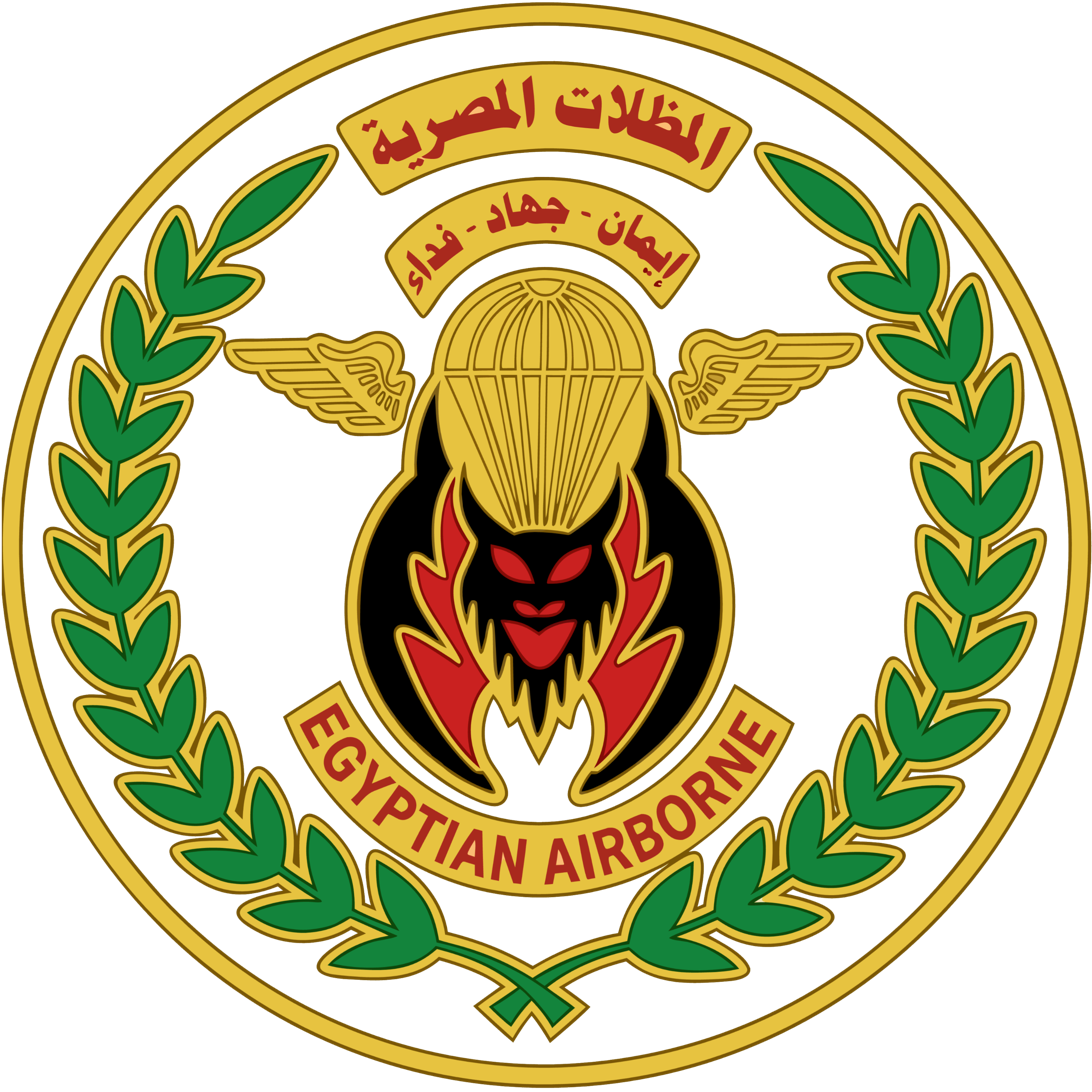
- Active: 1954 - present
- Country: Egypt
- Branch: Egyptian Army
- Type: Airborne forces
- Size: 3 Brigades
- Garrison/HQ: Inshas, Sharqia
- Mottos: "Strength, Determination, Faith"
- Anniversaries: 10th of July
- Engagements: Suez Crisis; Yemen War; Six-Day War; War of Attrition; Yom Kippur War; Gulf War; Sinai Insurgency

Commanders
- Current commander: Chief of Staff Brig. Gen. Mehrez Abdel Wahab

The Airborne Forces (Arabic: قوات المظلات, romanized: Quwwāt El Maẓallāt, lit. 'Parachute Forces', Arabic pronunciation: [ˈqʊw.wæːt ɑl.mɑzˈzæl.læt]) are the airborne forces brigade units, and one of two branches under the Administration of Special Units of the Egyptian Army, alongside the El Saa'qa Forces.

== History ==
The history of Egyptian paratroopers began when Egypt's military attaché in Britain observed the effectiveness of airborne forces during World War II. In 1946, he proposed the creation of an Egyptian Paratroop Regiment, an idea welcomed by the High Command of the Armed Forces. Political and economic conditions delayed the program until 1951. That year, four army officers, First Lieutenants Mohammed Atif Abdel Ghaffar, Sobhi Mohammad El Malah, Mohammed Gamal Suleiman, and Abdel Qawi Izet Mahgoub, attended airborne training in the United Kingdom. They returned to Egypt in late 1951 and performed the first airborne jump in Egypt on 10 July 1952, which is now celebrated as the Airborne's national day.

Later, more officers received airborne training in the UK. The only officer sent to the United States for the Rangers course was Saad El Shazly, who completed it in 1954 and subsequently founded the Egyptian Paratroopers School. Volunteers were trained by the returning officers. In 1955, the 75th Parachute Battalion was established, with Shazly commanding it from 1955 to 1959.

=== UN Mission ===
A UAR parachute battalion was dispatched to the Congo on 9 August 1960 as part of the United Nations Operation in the Congo. Reports indicate this battalion was the 75th Airborne Battalion. It initially consisted of 350 Egyptians (four companies) and 150 Syrians (one company), all speaking French or English, under the command of Saad el-Shazly. Later reports listed its strength as 550. Although initially slated for Coquilhatville, the battalion spent much of its time at the airport in Léopoldville.

In 1961, the 25th Airborne Brigade was formed, becoming Egypt's first airborne brigade.

=== North Yemen Civil War ===
During the North Yemeni Civil War in the early 1960s, the 75th Battalion supported Yemeni Republican forces. Its mission was to land in and secure Sa'ada, considered the gateway to the captured capital city of Sana'a. The battalion landed several hours before the Royalist advance, engaged in intense combat, and successfully defeated the Royalist forces to secure the area.

=== October War ===
Egyptian paratroopers fought in the October War without conducting any combat drops. Shazly notes that the Army had three parachute brigades at the time. The brigades are generally identified as the 150th, 160th, and 182nd; Shazly uses two of these designations. Trevor N. Dupuy writes that the 182nd Parachute Brigade was assigned to Second Army, while the 150th and 160th were held in GHQ reserve. According to Shazly, a brigade moved forward from reserve around 17–18 October 1973. Ismailia is a likely location for the 182nd Brigade, with a forward-moving reserve brigade consistent with the 150th.

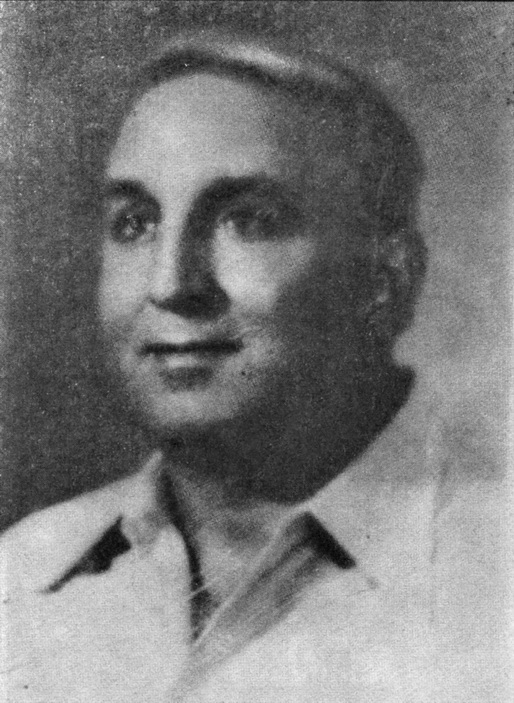
Ismail Azmy, commander of the 182nd Paratrooper Brigade

After the Battle of the Chinese Farm, Ismailia was under threat. The 182nd Paratrooper Brigade, comprising the 81st, 85th, and 89th Battalions (each with three companies) under Colonel Ismail Azmy, was tasked with defending the area south of Ismailia against an Israeli offensive. Azmy arrived at Nafisha with most of his brigade at midnight on 17 October, where he was briefed by Brigadier General Abd el-Munim Khalil, commander of Second Army. Khalil identified west bank strong points as objectives for the paratroopers, whose ramparts could provide fire support to Egyptian forces on the east bank. The paratroopers were also to hold Serabaeum and the bridges over the Sweetwater Canal.

In the Battle of Ismailia, the combined Egyptian paratrooper-El Saa'qa force achieved a tactical and strategic victory during a period of overall battlefield deterioration and confusion at GHQ. Sharon's advance toward Ismailia was halted, and Second Army's logistics remained secure. According to Dupuy, Israeli forces remained roughly ten kilometers south of Ismailia, which was heavily damaged.

=== Gulf War ===
The paratroopers’ most recent major operation took place during the Gulf War, when the 170th Airborne Brigade was deployed to the UAE to protect against potential Iraqi attacks.

== Training ==
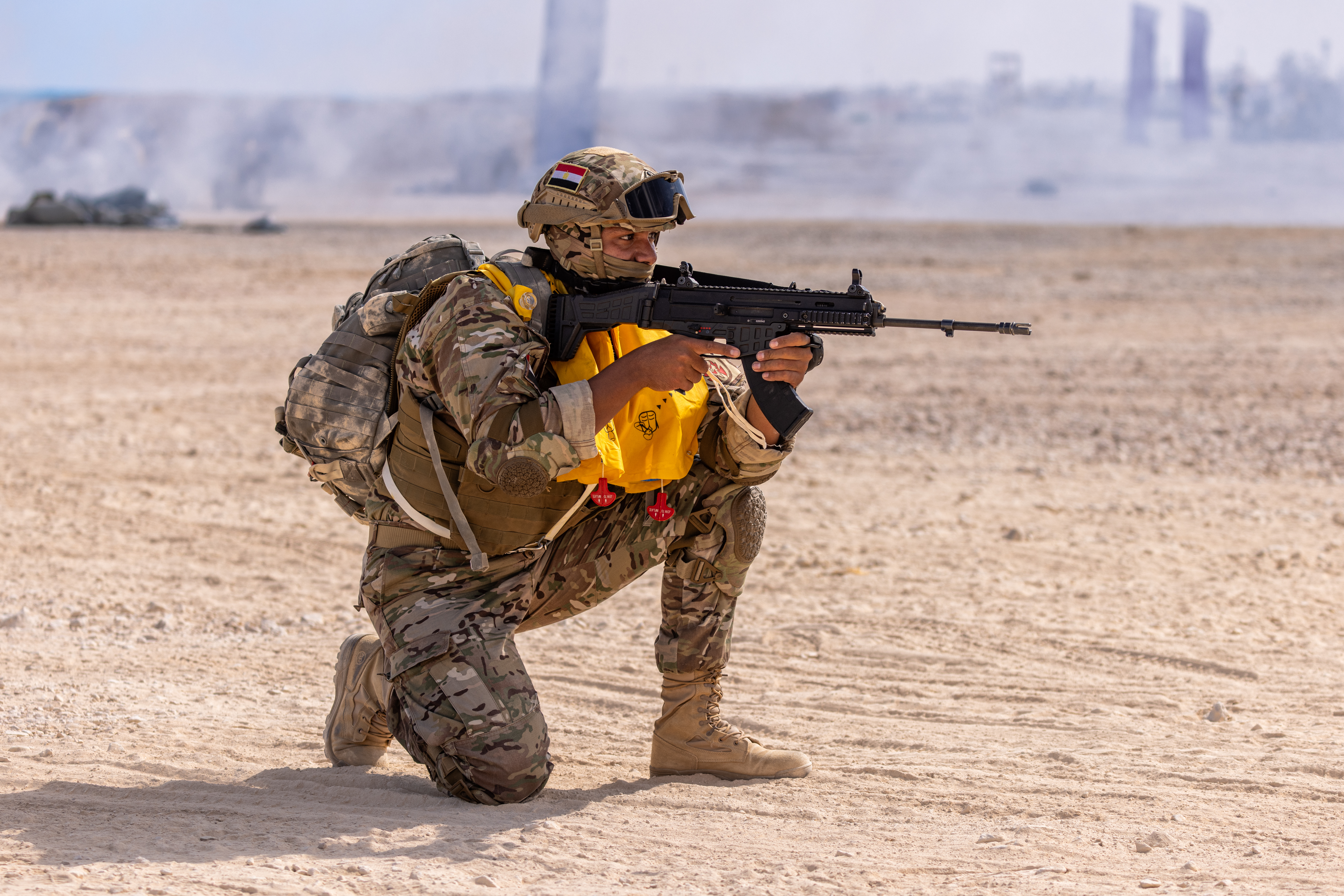
An Egyptian paratrooper participates in an amphibious assault exercise.

The units conduct an eight-week basic parachute training course at the Airborne School. The program is divided into four main phases: two weeks of physical fitness, two weeks of ground training, two weeks of tower training, and one week of actual jumps. Cadets complete the course after performing three to five jumps from a C-130 Hercules at an altitude of 2,000 feet.

Ground training covers essential airborne skills, including standing at the aircraft door, jumping correctly, donning and managing the parachute, controlling descent, landing safely, and releasing the parachute upon reaching the ground.

Tower training begins with jumps from a wooden tower approximately 34 meters high, simulating the initial experience of exiting an aircraft. Cadets then progress to a metal tower around 80 meters high, using a basic open canopy attached to a crane, which lifts the jumper to the top and allows for controlled descent.

Actual jumping week consists of three jumps from the C-130. Successful completion of the course earns the cadet the parachutist badge, a basic parachute insignia with two wings.

This basic parachute course is mandatory for military college students and personnel attached to parachute units.

== Current Structure ==
The current structure of the Airborne Forces:

- 182nd Airborne Brigade:
  - HQ Company
  - 94th Parachute Infantry Battalion
  - 51st Parachute Infantry Battalion
  - 38th Parachute Infantry Battalion
  - 25th Parachute Infantry Battalion
  - 813th Parachute Mortar Battalion
  - Parachute Anti-Tank Battalion
  - Parachute Reconnaissance Company
- 170th Airborne Brigade:
  - HQ Company
  - 151st Parachute Infantry Battalion
  - 80th Parachute Infantry Battalion
  - 73rd Parachute Infantry Battalion
  - 20th Parachute Infantry Battalion
  - 240th Parachute Mortar Battalion
  - Parachute Anti-Tank Battalion
  - Parachute Reconnaissance Company
- 220th Airmobile Brigade
- Support units:
  - Airborne Anti-Tank Regiment
  - Airborne Mortar Regiment
  - Airborne Reconnaissance Battalion
  - Parachute Maintenance & Cargo Battalion
  - Training Battalion
  - 27th Parachute Battalion
