= EgyptAir Flight 321 =

1976 aircraft hijacking

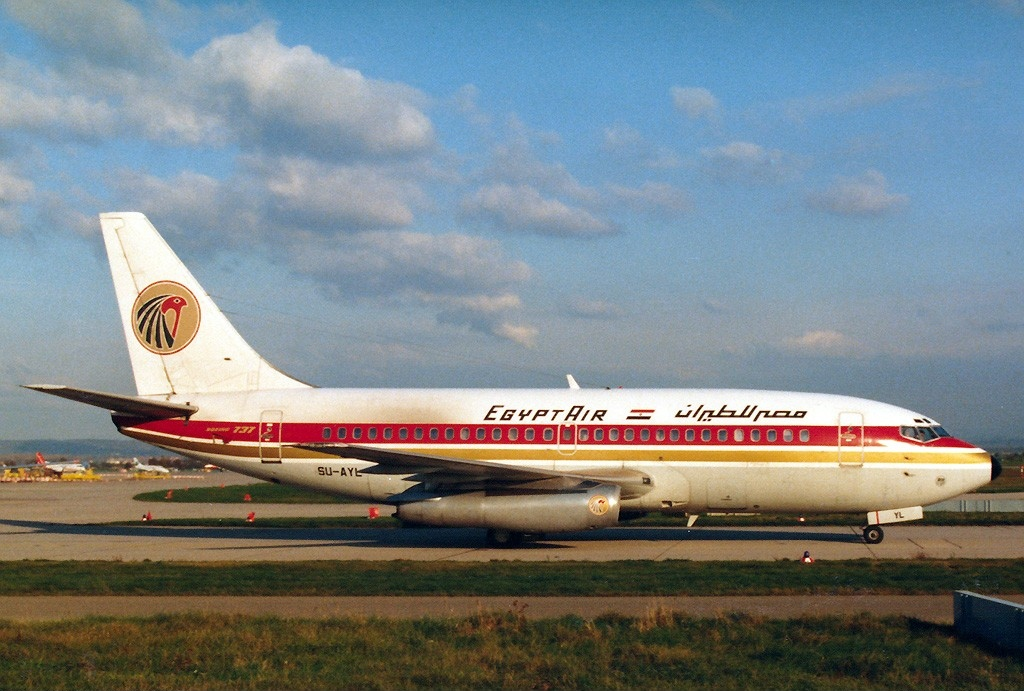
- SU-AYL, an aircraft similar to the one involved

Incident
- Date: 23 August 1976
- Summary: Hijacking
- Site: en route; Cairo to Luxor

Aircraft
- Aircraft type: Boeing 737-266(Adv.)
- Operator: EgyptAir
- Registration: Unknown
- Flight origin: Cairo International Airport
- Destination: Luxor Airport
- Occupants: 101
- Passengers: 95
- Crew: 6
- Fatalities: 0
- Survivors: 101

EgyptAir Flight 321 was a Cairo-Luxor Egyptian flight which was hijacked by three armed terrorists claiming to be from the Abd Al-Nasir Movement. After hijacking the aircraft, the terrorists demanded to be flown to Libya. The terrorists agreed to land in Luxor instead, after being persuaded that the aircraft needed to be refuelled. In Luxor, Sa'ka Forces stormed the aircraft and captured the hijackers. No passengers were injured during the operation. The terrorists were convicted and sentenced to hard labor for life.

== Background ==
On 23 August 1976, three armed terrorists claiming to be from the Abd Al-Nasir Movement hijacked the Egyptian Cairo-Luxor flight and asked the pilot to land in Tripoli. One of the three hijackers was a 21-year-old Palestinian, Mohammed Naguid, who was working in Kuwait. They demanded the release of five Libyans imprisoned in Cairo in connection with two assassination attempts. The context was the deterioration of relations between Egypt and Libya after the Yom Kippur War due to Libyan opposition to Sadat's peace policy. There had been a breakdown in unification talks between the two governments, which subsequently led to the Egyptian–Libyan War. Fifteen minutes after takeoff from Cairo International Airport, an Italian pilot called the airport to report that he had received a beam aerial from the Egyptian aircraft heading to Luxor that it had been hijacked and the flight was under terrorist control.

== The operation ==
President Sadat ordered the Prime Minister and the Minister of Defense to make the necessary decisions to protect the passengers and arrest the terrorists. The Prime Minister and the Minister of Defense quickly flew to Luxor International Airport where they started a secret meeting in the airport's tower, while Major General Abdul Hafiz Al-Bagori, Governor of Qena started negotiations with the three terrorists in order to gain time. In a call between the cockpit and the airport, the pilot complained about a problem in the aircraft - that it hadn't shown that the aircraft needing refuelling - and that the aircraft needed maintenance. The terrorists were persuaded to allow the aircraft to land in Luxor for refuelling. Negotiations continued until 3 p.m., when the governor told the terrorists that engineers were ready. The engineers were two disguised Sa'ka Officers, who went inside and outside the aircraft several times in order to appear to be maintenance workers. Minutes later three officers stormed the aircraft and captured the hijackers. The on-site commander of the Egyptian commandos was Colonel Sayed El Sharkawy. He and the other commandos have received the Star of Honor medal from President Sadat following the successful operation.

== Aftermath ==
The 95 passengers, mostly tourists, and 6 crew members were all rescued unharmed. During investigations the hijackers said they had received directions from Libya, that had the operation succeeded they would have received a $250,000 reward from Muammar Gaddafi, and that they had already received 1/5th of this reward. The Palestinian Revolution Movement also claimed credit for the hijacking.

== Reactions ==
- The Palestine Liberation Organization condemned the hijacking and stressed that it was not related to actions intended to harm the Palestinian struggle.
- Sudanese president Gaafar Nimeiry called Egyptian president Sadat to congratulate him in the name of the Sudanese people for the success of the Egyptian Special Forces in rescuing the passengers.

== See also ==
- List of aircraft hijackings
- EgyptAir Flight 181 - EgyptAir flight hijacked in 2016
- EgyptAir Flight 648 - EgyptAir flight hijacked in 1985
