= Egyptian raid on Larnaca International Airport =

1978 shootout between Egyptian and Cypriot special forces in Larnaca, Cyprus

1978 Cyprus Hostage Crisis
Date	18 February 1978 - 19 February 1978
Location	Nicosia and Larnaca International Airport
Result	Cypriot victory: Egyptian Intervention Failed; Hijack Situation lifted; Hostages freed; Diplomatic ties between Egypt and Cyprus were severed for 3 years.

Belligerents
Egypt: Unit 777	Cyprus: Cypriot National Guard	Abu Nidal Organisation

Commanders and leaders
Anwar Sadat Brigadier General Nabil Sogri (surrendered)	Spyros Kyprianou Lt Colonel Andreas Ιosifides	Samir Mohammed Khadar (surrendered) Zayed Hussein Ahmed Alali (surrendered)

Strength
60–75 commandos	65 persons - one infantry platoon from 395 Battalion (35 persons with two 0.50 M2 Brownings and two M40 recoilless rifles) and a commando platoon (30 persons)	2 Hijackers

Casualties and losses
15 commandos killed 3 members of the C-130 crew killed 18 commandos wounded 1 C-130 aircraft destroyed 1 Jeep all-terrain vehicle destroyed	8 injuries reported	Both hijackers surrender

On 19 February 1978, Egyptian special forces raided Larnaca International Airport near Larnaca, Cyprus, in an attempt to intervene in a hijacking. Earlier, two assassins had killed prominent Egyptian newspaper editor Yusuf Sibai and then captured as hostages several Arabs who were attending a convention in Nicosia. As Cypriot forces were trying to negotiate with the hostage-takers at the airport, Egyptian troops began their own assault without authorization from the Cypriots. The unauthorized raid resulted in the Egyptians and the Cypriots exchanging gunfire, killing or injuring more than 20 of the Egyptian commandos. As a result, Egypt and Cyprus severed political ties for several years after the incident. The Incident of the Egyptian Raid on Larnaca International Airport, combined with the Hostage Situation, are sometimes collectively referred to as the 1978 Cyprus Hostage Crisis

== Hijacking ==
During the late hours of 18 February 1978, Yusuf Sibai, editor of a prominent Egyptian newspaper Al-Ahram and a friend of the Egyptian president, Anwar Sadat, was assassinated by two gunmen at a convention being held at the Nicosia Hilton. The two assassins captured 16 Arab convention delegates as hostages (among them, two PLO representatives and one Egyptian national) and demanded transportation to Larnaca International Airport. They also demanded and were supplied with a Cyprus Airways Douglas DC-8 aircraft. After negotiations with the Cypriot authorities, the hijackers were allowed to fly the aircraft out of Cyprus with 11 hostages and four crew members. The aircraft, however, was denied permission to land in Djibouti, Syria and Saudi Arabia and was forced to return and land in Cyprus a few hours later. Among the hostages was an aide to PLO leader Yasser Arafat who telephoned Cypriot President Spyros Kyprianou and offered the services of a twelve-man squad of Force 17 gunmen. Kyprianou accepted and dispatched an airliner to Beirut to pick them up. The squad was kept out of sight inside the terminal in case the situation with the hijackers deteriorated. Later, there were reports that Arafat's men participated with the shooting of the Egyptian commandos, but Cyprus officials insisted that the PLO squad never fired a shot.

According to a report in Time magazine, Sadat was aggrieved by the assassination of his personal friend and soon after Arafat's call, begged Kyprianou to rescue the hostages and extradite the terrorists to Cairo. Kyprianou responded by promising to oversee the rescue operation and any negotiations personally, and travelled to the airport himself. According to the same report however, Sadat dispatched Task Force 777 from an elite commando unit to Cyprus aboard a C-130 Hercules transport aircraft. Cairo merely informed Kyprianou that "people are on the way to help rescue the hostages" and did not reveal who was aboard nor what their intentions were. Upon landing in Cyprus, the Egyptian force immediately began an assault, dispatching a single Jeep all-terrain vehicle with three men to race ahead of an estimated 58 troops (another report has this figure at 74) moving towards the hijacked aircraft on foot.

== Egyptian raid ==
As the Egyptian troops advanced quickly towards the hijacked DC-8 aircraft and the Cypriot special forces (LOK) who surrounded it, the LOK reportedly issued a single verbal warning to halt and submit, though in other reports, the Cypriots issued two verbal warnings, the second demand for the Egyptians to return to their aircraft. As this occurred, the occupants of the Jeep and the Cypriot operators exchanged gunfire, and the Egyptian Jeep was struck by a rocket propelled grenade (RPG), as well as gunfire, killing all three occupants. As the vehicle came to a halt, the Cypriots and the main Egyptian force confronted each other at a range of less than 300 metres (330 yd), and it is variously reported that the Egyptians, who lacked any form of cover, dropped down onto the tarmac in prone firing positions. At this moment, the two forces engaged each other with heavy gunfire, and the Cypriots opened fire on the Egyptian C-130H aircraft with a 106 mm anti-tank M40 recoilless rifle, striking it in the nose and killing the three crew on board.

With their aircraft destroyed, the Egyptian force and the Cypriot special forces exchanged gunfire for nearly an hour in sporadic fighting on the open tarmac. Some of the Egyptian troops took cover in a nearby empty Air France aircraft.

Kyprianou, who was watching the events from the airport control tower, was forced to withdraw from the windows and take cover as Egyptian commandos shot at the tower with automatic gunfire.

== Aftermath ==
Of the Egyptian commando force, 15 men were killed, in addition to three crew of the C-130H Hercules. An estimated 15 more Egyptian commandos were reported to have been taken injured to Larnaca General Hospital with gunshot wounds.

After the assault, it was learned that the surrender of the two hostage-takers had already been secured at the time of the failed Egyptian attack, and the two men were taken prisoner by the Cypriots and later extradited to Egypt, where they received death sentences, later commuted to life sentences.

On 20 February, Egypt recalled its diplomatic mission and requested the Cypriot government to do the same in Cairo. Cyprus requested the withdrawal of Egypt's military attaché. Egypt and Cyprus severed political ties for several years after the incident, until Sadat was assassinated in 1981.

Kyprianou offered reconciliation and apologies, but maintained that Cyprus could not have allowed the Egyptians to act. Other Arab countries such as Syria and Libya denounced Egypt's action.

As a consequence of the disaster, the Egyptian government formed a dedicated counter-terrorist unit within the El-Sa'ka Forces which was named after the Egyptian task force. Seven years later, they would be dispatched on a similar mission to Malta to storm a hijacked Egyptian airliner, another botched operation that resulted in the death of dozens of passengers.

== See also ==
- EgyptAir Flight 648

== Sources ==
- "1978: Egyptian forces die in Cyprus gunfight".

. 19 February 2008.

- Accident report. Aviation Safety Network.
