= El Saa'qa Forces =

Special Forces unit of the Egyptian Army

El Saa‘qa Forces
- Arabic: قوات الصاعقة
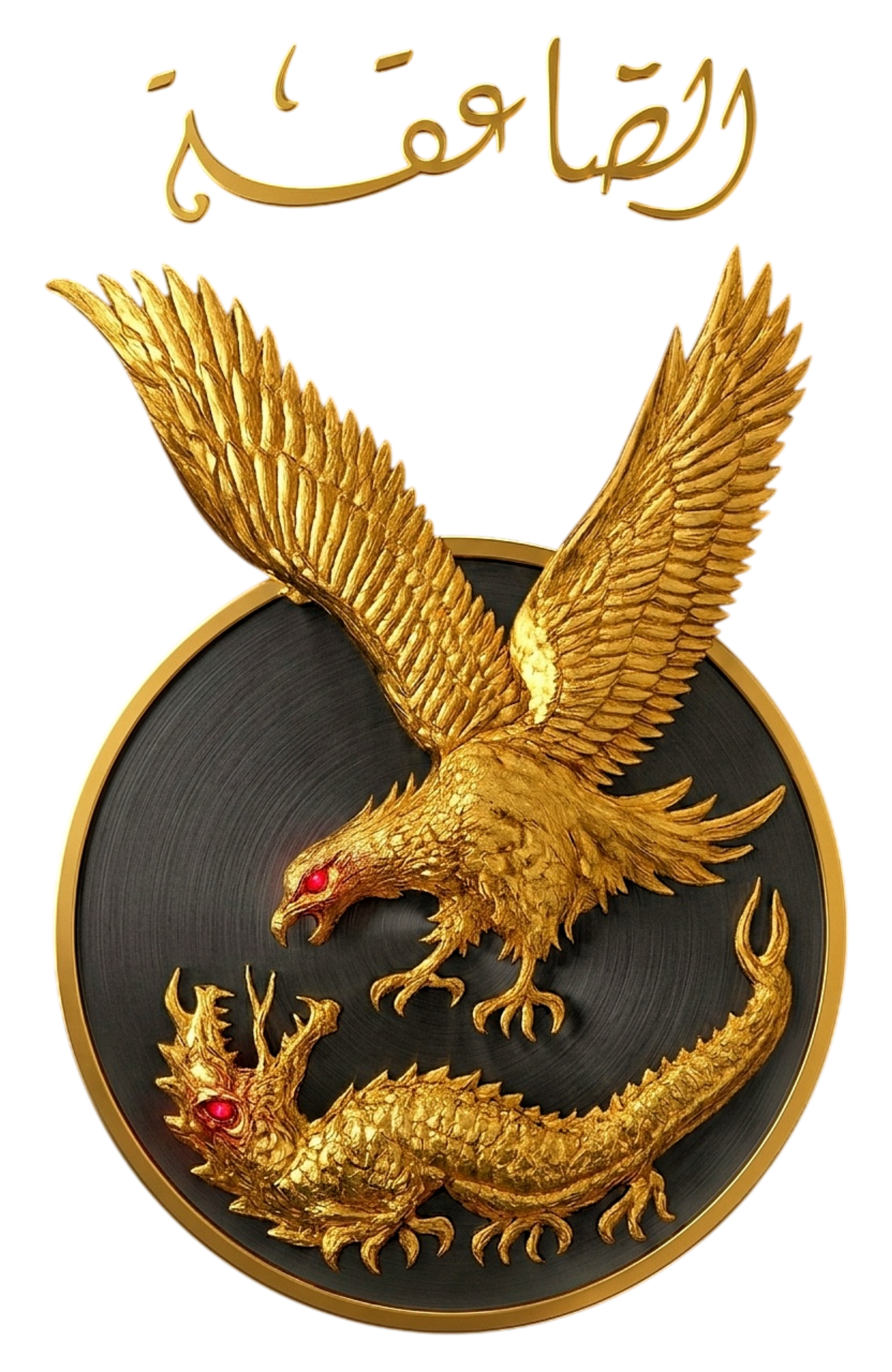
- Insignia of the El Saa‘qa Forces
- Active: 1956–present
- Country: Egypt
- Branch: Egyptian Army
- Type: Special Forces
- Garrison/HQ: Inshas, Sharqia
- Motto: "Sweat in training saves blood in battle"
- Colors: Black and yellow
- Engagements: North Yemen Civil War; Six Day War; War of Attrition; Shadwan Raid; October War; Operation Badr (1973); Battle of Ismailia; EgyptAir Flight 321; Raid on Larnaca International Airport; Gulf War; Sinai Insurgency; Operation Sinai; Operation Martyr's Right

Commanders
- Current commander: Major General Emad Abdel Qadir Yamani

El Saa‘qa Forces (Arabic: قوات الصاعقة, romanized: Quwwat El Saa‘qa, lit. 'Thunderbolt Forces', Arabic pronunciation: [qowˈwæt əsˈsˤɑːʕiqæ]) are one of two branches under the Administration of Special Units of the Egyptian Army, alongside the Paratroopers. Established in the 1950s by young officer Galal Haridy (ar:جلال_هريدي), who was later promoted to Major General, they perform specialized roles such as infiltration behind enemy lines, ambushing supply routes, assaulting command posts, and anti-armour operations.

El Saa‘qa primarily recruits through conscription, supplemented by a core of professional officers and NCOs, with recruits selected for physical fitness and suitability. Their history and prominence in Egyptian popular culture make them particularly admired among young conscripts.

== History ==
The origins of El Saa‘qa date back to the early 1950s. In 1954, Egyptian officers Galal Haridy and Nabil Shukri were sent to the United States to attend the US Ranger School, where they received training in commando and airborne operations. Upon his return Haridy proposed the creation of a special operations unit in Egypt modeled on what he had observed in the United States. General Ali Amer, then commander of the Eastern Command, approved the idea, and the first training course was established at Abu Ageila in Sinai in 1955, with Haridy serving as senior instructor. The unit was trained in advanced combat techniques, parachuting, and specialized operations, forming the foundation of Egypt’s modern special forces.

Among the first officers selected for the new force was Ibrahim El Refai, who later rose to prominence as a commander. Other junior officers and a number of civilian volunteers were also admitted to the early training cycles. These initial cadres formed the nucleus of what would later become the Egyptian Army’s special forces branch.

=== 1956 Suez Crisis ===
During the Tripartite Aggression in 1956, El Saa‘qa forces were deployed to Port Said against the British and French landings. Haridy recounted that his unit infiltrated the city disguised as fishermen, transporting weapons and ammunition by boat through Lake Manzala. Once inside, the commandos distributed arms and positioned fighters throughout homes and shops across Port Said, with the assistance of local residents. The popular resistance worked closely with El Saa‘qa, and children and civilians joined in efforts to harass and disrupt the occupation forces.

One of the most significant actions carried out by the unit was the destruction of a British tank camp in Port Said. The raid resulted in the disabling of several enemy vehicles, though the commandos also suffered casualties, including the first El Saa‘qa fatality, Sergeant Ramadan Abdel Raziq. British forces retaliated by taking around 500 Port Said civilians hostage and deporting them to Malta. The experience of these operations convinced the Egyptian General Command of the need for a permanent special forces branch.

=== Establishment ===
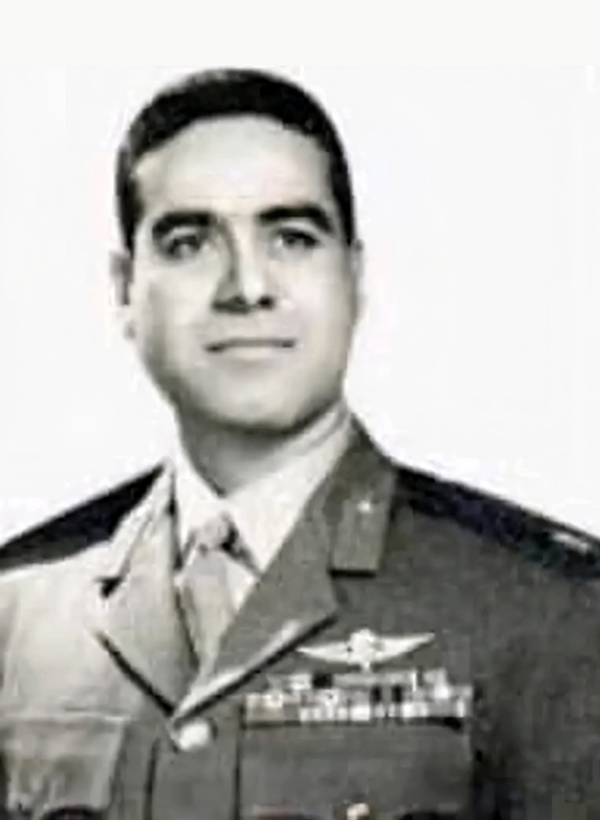
Captain Galal Haridy in 1962, later promoted to Major General

Following the experience of the 1956 war, the General Command approved the establishment of El Saa‘qa as a permanent arm of the Egyptian Army. In 1957 the branch was formally constituted, with Galal Haridy appointed its first commander while still holding the rank of captain. This marked the first time in modern Egyptian military history that an officer of such junior rank was entrusted with creating and leading a new service arm.

The first headquarters of El Saa‘qa was temporarily established at the Mohamed Ali Palace former palace in Shubra, before moving to permanent facilities at Inshas in the Sharqia Governorate. What began as a small special operations section quickly expanded into battalion strength. The first operational unit was the 23rd El Saa‘qa Battalion, named in honor of the 23 July Revolution. It was soon followed by the 13th, 33rd, 43rd, 53rd, 63rd, 73rd, and ultimately the 103rd Battalion, forming the backbone of the corps through the 1960s.

A dedicated El Saa‘qa training center was also established at Inshas to systematize commando training, with Haridy and his cadre of early instructors, including Ibrahim El Refai and other young officers, responsible for developing the branch’s doctrine. These units became Egypt’s primary special operations forces, tasked with unconventional warfare, sabotage, reconnaissance, and deep penetration missions behind enemy lines.

=== Post-Six-Day War: Formation of Combat Group 39 ===
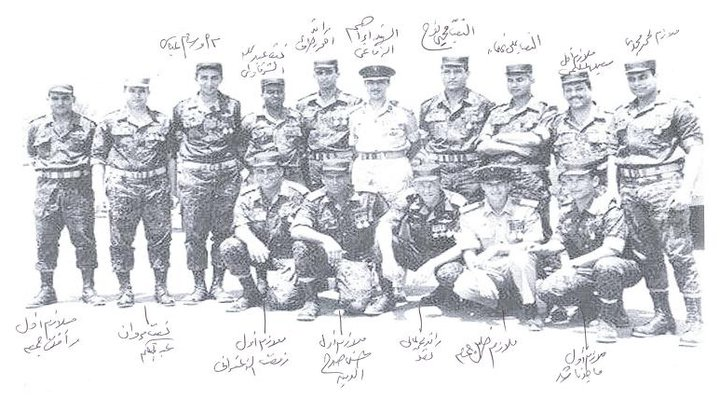
Members of Combat Group 39

Following Egypt's defeat and Israel’s occupation of Sinai in the Six-Day War, Combat Group 39 was formed as a joint Army-Navy unit specializing in Suez Canal crossings and strikes against Israeli positions in the Sinai. Under the leadership of Ibrahim El Refai, who served as trainer, planner, and commander, the unit grew from a small team into a fully independent and operational combat force.

Combat Group 39 began its activities during the War of Attrition, initially composed of a mix of El Saa‘qa, naval, and army personnel under the guidance of Brigadier General Mustafa Kamal Hussein. During this period, the group carried out approximately 80 operations, including raids, sabotage, and reconnaissance missions, such as the retaliatory operation for the death of General Abdel Moneim Riyad in 1968 and attacks on El Tor Airport and electric missile sites. It also captured the first Israeli prisoner on 26 August 1968 and seized weapons and ammunition during these operations.

Combat Group 39 maintained a close collaboration with the Sinai Arab organization, which consisted of local Bedouins and civilians trained by Egyptian intelligence for operations behind enemy lines. The unit later played a significant role in the 1973 October War, conducting frequent raids and strikes across Sinai, including attacks on oil installations, airfields, and Israeli positions, causing substantial enemy losses in personnel and equipment.

El Refai personally led many of the unit’s missions, conducting thirty-nine operations between July 1967 and August 1968, with additional raids continuing into early 1970. These operations included short-range reconnaissance and raids, which, while limited in direct military impact, provided crucial combat experience and boosted Egyptian morale.

Among the most notable actions under his leadership were raids on the Israeli port of Eilat. On 16 November 1969, Combat Group 39 conducted a long-range operation, likely involving submarine insertion, in which frogmen attached limpet mines to three Israeli landing craft, sinking them. Another raid on Eilat on 6 February 1970 sank two additional landing craft. El Refai was likely involved in planning and coordinating this second operation. For his leadership and valor during these missions, personnel of Combat Group 39 collectively received the Military Order of the Republic, while El Refai personally earned multiple medals for gallantry, solidifying his status as one of Egypt’s most decorated soldiers.

On 22 January 1970, during the War of Attrition, Israel launched a heliborne raid, dubbed Operation Rhodes, against the Egyptian island of Shadwan. The island was defended by about 100 Egyptian soldiers, including 60 El Saa‘qa commandos from the 93rd Battalion, with the remainder from the Egyptian Navy and technical staff. The assaulting Israeli force consisted of the Paratroopers Brigade’s 202nd Battalion, and its elite reconnaissance company, as well as Shayetet 13 naval commandos, supported by airpower. The raid began with airstrikes, after which Israeli helicopters ferried troops onto the island. Within an hour, six out nine of the Egyptian outposts around the lighthouse had been overrun.

The battle lasted approximately 36 hours. Egyptian El Saa‘qa commandos defended the island from fortified positions, under sustained air and naval bombardment, employing small arms, machine guns, RPGs, and artillery. Israeli forces advanced, supported continuously by helicopters, encountering resistance. On one occasion, after one Egyptian position ran out of ammunition, Israeli troops captured two Egyptians. They sent one to a nearby building by the island lighthouse to convince those inside to surrender. The soldier reported that the building was empty, and an Israeli officer subsequently entered with a group of soldiers. As they entered, they were met with concentrated fire from a machine gun operated by an Egyptian officer, inflicting casualties.

Egyptian officials reported 80 casualties on their side during the raid, while Israeli casualties were reported at around 50, including the loss of two aircraft. Israel, in turn, claims 10 Israeli casualties during the operation. Israeli officials also claimed that approximately 70 Egyptians were killed, including both military personnel stationed on Shadwan and sailors on the torpedo boats that were sunk. Israeli forces evacuated on 23 January, demolishing most structures except the lighthouse, and withdrawing with 62 Egyptian prisoners and a radar system. On 24 January 1970, two days after the operation, a truck transporting ammunition captured by Israel on Shadwan exploded after being unloaded at Eilat, resulting in the deaths of 19 Israeli soldiers and 5 civilian IDF personnel.

=== Role during the October War ===
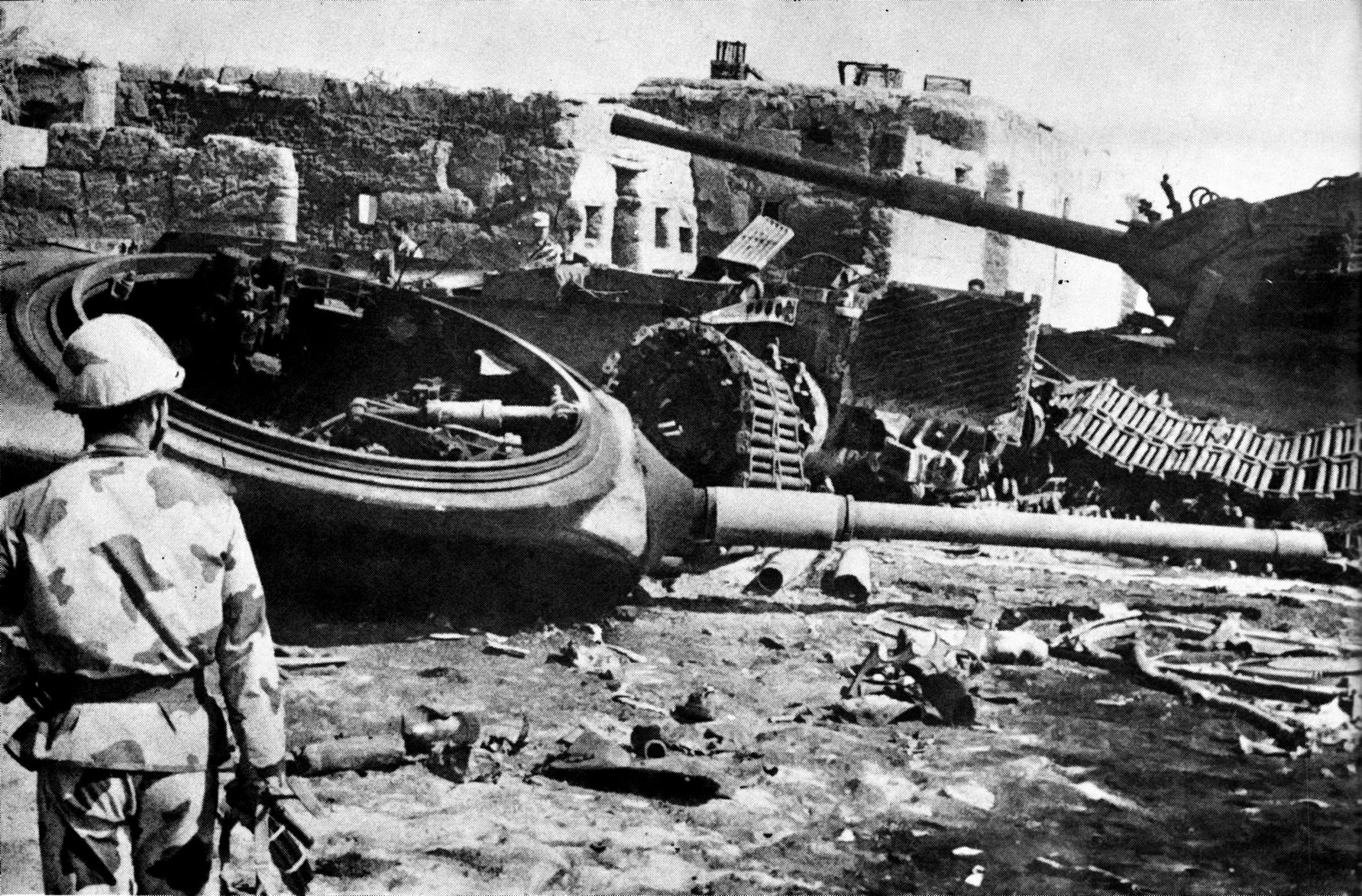
An El Saa‘qa soldier inspects destroyed Israeli tanks in the village of Abu Atwa.

During the 1973 October War, the El Saa‘qa Forces were involved in supporting the main infantry crossing of the Suez Canal and securing key positions. Initially, El Saa‘qa units had only limited defensive plans, which were fully developed by 1972 to include assessments of Israeli force strength, deployment, and the allocation of Egyptian forces. The units also participated in extensive deception operations, including repeated movements to areas such as Wadi Sallam and the Red Sea, intended to mislead Israeli forces into believing these were routine exercises.

As part of a deception plan ordered by President Anwar Sadat, some El Saa‘qa units were deployed in apparent “training” exercises and false movements, designed to mislead the enemy about the real timing and location of operations. Their actions delayed and weakened Israeli attempts to reinforce positions, contributing decisively to the success of the Egyptian army’s crossing of the Suez Canal in Operation Badr. During the war, these forces engaged Israeli units directly, setting ambushes in strategic locations such as the Abu Atwa area and the surrounding mango orchards, disrupting enemy advances, destroying tanks, and capturing soldiers.

El Saa‘qa units were organized into several groups during the war, including the 127th, 129th, and 132nd groups in the Red Sea region, with the 139th and 145th serving as general reserves. These forces were tasked with engaging enemy reserves, delaying reinforcements, and securing the flanks of the main Egyptian infantry forces, which crossed the canal with limited armor and heavy equipment.

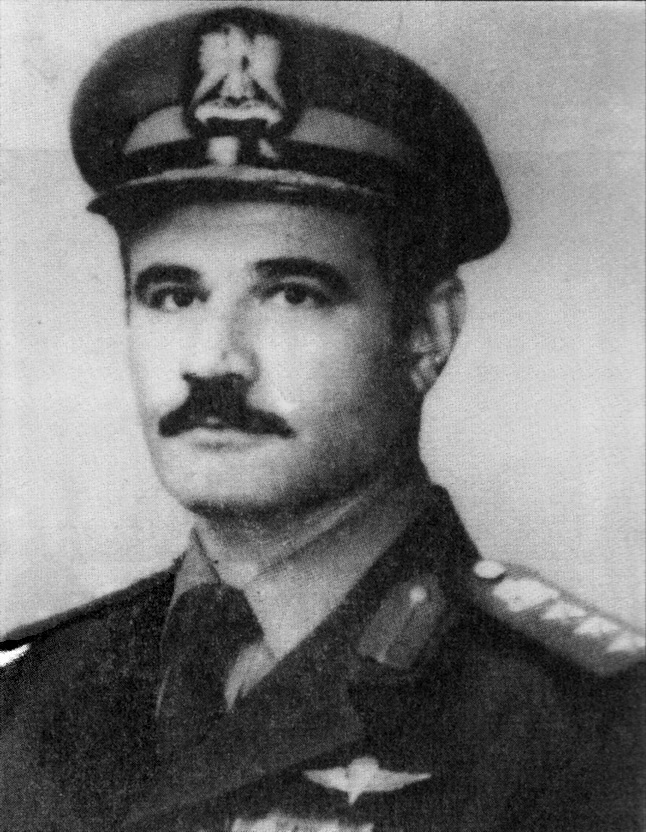
Colonel Osama Ibrahim, commander of the 139th El Saa‘qa group which participated in the successful defense of Ismailia during the October War.

Units frequently exceeded their expected engagement durations, such as the 129th group, which fought for 17 days in the Suez Strait when only 12 hours had been planned. Early in the war, the 129th group destroyed 28 tanks and 12 armored vehicles. The 127th group encircled a fortified position at Port Fuad, capturing 37 Israeli soldiers and seizing three tanks on October 13. Combat Group 39, under the command of Ibrahim El Refai, played a decisive role in halting Israeli forces under Ariel Sharon from entering Ismailia and surrounding the Second Army, inflicting heavy casualties in the process.

The 139th Group led by Colonel Osama Ibrahim was initially assigned a mission to advance toward Deversoir and destroy Israeli bridges, with lightly equipped troops and no armor. The operation, planned without consulting the Second Army, caused confusion and seemed nearly impossible. As the unit moved south from Ismailia, they encountered retreating Egyptian paratroopers and an Israeli ambush. Dense mango orchards minimized casualties despite artillery fire and vehicle losses. Ali Heikal contacted Ibrahim, who arrived at Ismailia headquarters after midnight. After negotiations, Brigadier General Abdul Munim Khaleel convinced General Headquarters to place the 139th Group under his command to fortify Ismailia instead of pursuing the original mission. Ibrahim reorganized the force, occupying Abu Atwa and Nefisha with a battalion each by dawn on October 21.

Despite the initial confusion, the El Saa‘qa, alongside paratroopers of the 85th Battalion, reinforced Egyptian defenses and helped repel the Israeli attack. By nightfall on October 20, Israeli forces had made no progress, and Egyptian troops were in control.

=== Sinai insurgency ===
Following the 2013 coup, the Egyptian military launched large-scale counterinsurgency operations in the Sinai Peninsula, marking their first sustained engagement against Islamist militants in the region. During the campaign, the El Saa‘qa operated alongside Unit 999 and conventional forces, conducting high-risk raids, securing militant strongholds, and targeting key insurgent figures. They were deployed in operations under joint command with military intelligence officers, often in urban and populated areas. Despite their elite training, their effectiveness was constrained by coordination issues, reliance on conscripted support, and the lack of integrated counterinsurgency doctrine. The El Saa‘qa's operations contributed to significant militant casualties, but these tactical successes occurred within a broader campaign characterized by mass arrests, forced relocations, and human rights abuses. By 2019, the military had largely pacified the peninsula.

==== Battle of El Bart ====
In the early hours of July 7th, 2017, around 4:00 AM, 60 Egyptian soldiers including members of the 103rd El Saa‘qa Battalion defended a checkpoint in southern Rafah, which leads to the Tarabin Bedouin village of El Bart, against a coordinated militant ambush by ISIS. Around 100 heavily armed attackers, including vehicle-borne improvised explosive devices, attempted to overrun the position and raise their flags. The assault began with a suicide car bombing at the checkpoint, followed by heavy gunfire from dozens of masked attackers on foot. The attackers also arrived in approximately 12 armed vehicles, attempting to encircle the checkpoint.

Colonel Ahmed Mansi, commander of the battalion, directed defensive operations from the roof of a building within the compound while actively engaging the militants. Despite being heavily outnumbered and under continuous fire, the defenders maintained their positions through disciplined small-unit tactics and direct engagement, preventing the attackers from capturing the checkpoint.

In a recording made during the attack, Mansi called for assistance while praising the bravery of his comrades, saying, "Allahu Akbar to all the heroes of North Sinai... These could be the last minutes of my life.", and adding, "We are holding on to life and to the land and will not leave any martyr behind... We’d either bring back their rights, or die like them!".

The firefight lasted into the early morning and exacted a heavy toll on the defenders, with Mansi and several members of the battalion killed in action, bringing the total number of Egyptian soldiers killed to 23. Mansi was killed when a bullet struck a nearby tank, and a fragment from the impact hit the back of his head, causing a fatal injury. Despite the losses, the defenders killed over 40 militants and destroyed six enemy vehicles, successfully preventing the militants from seizing this strategic point, which links central Sinai with Rafah and Sheikh Zuweid.

Mansi’s life and service have been commemorated in media and public memorials. His biography was depicted in the television series El Ekhteyar (The Choice), and a floating bridge in Port Said was named in his honor.

== Training ==
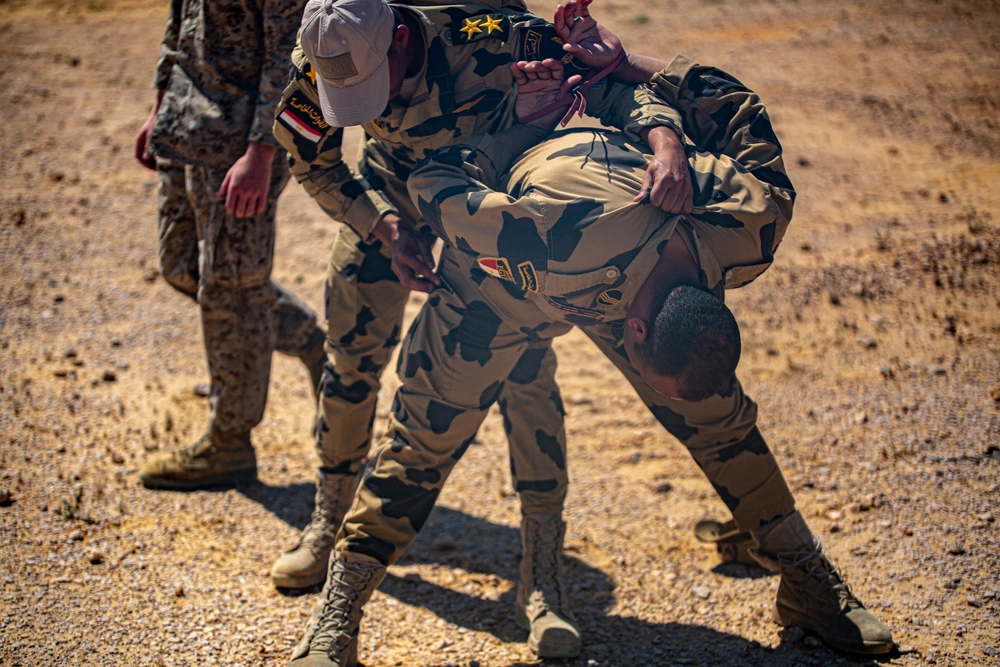
El Saa‘qa soldiers conduct detainee search training.

The El Saa‘qa School in Inshas provides training for personnel of the El Saa‘qa Forces. The daily program begins at 05:00 with a two-hour physical fitness session, followed by breakfast. Meals vary and are described as designed to provide sufficient nutrition for training.

The full training lasts 34 weeks and includes extensive physical conditioning, adaptation to the special operations lifestyle, weapons handling, and military swimming and rescue techniques. The training focuses on physical endurance, discipline, and independent decision-making. Soldiers are instructed that responsibility can fall to any individual if commanders are incapacitated, and are taught both to follow and to discuss orders.

The school maintains multiple training areas, including facilities for unarmed combat, obstacle courses with water and fire barriers, crawling exercises under live fire, and fields for concealment, camouflage, and terrain navigation. Additional instruction includes parachuting and confidence-building exercises such as high-level jumps and underwater endurance training. Trainees undergo long-distance marches, both by day and night, defensive and offensive diving with closed-circuit oxygen systems, and simulated underwater attacks. They also practice parachuting, both free-fall and tactical, including land and water drops, and methods for assaulting coastal and maritime targets.

During a period known as "Hell Week" trainees are woken in the middle of the night and immediately subjected to extreme exercises, including crawling through sand under simulated fire. To increase difficulty, instructors make use of palm trees and tree trunks, which the recruits must lift and carry while performing push-ups, sit-ups, and pull-ups. All of this is combined with being sprayed with cold water, attacked with bladed weapons, and denied sleep, creating a grueling, high-stress environment designed to test endurance, adaptability, and mental resilience. Training concludes with comprehensive exercises combining land, sea, and air operations, as well as extended navigation and endurance marches.

The training also includes a desert survival phase in which each trainee is equipped only with a knife and a small water container before being transported by aircraft to an undisclosed location in the desert. Over the following five days, trainees must live independently, relying on their ability to hunt, prepare, and cook food found in the environment. This includes animals such as snakes, birds, and rabbits. The exercise is designed to test endurance, self-reliance, and the ability to operate in isolation under austere conditions.

== Structure ==
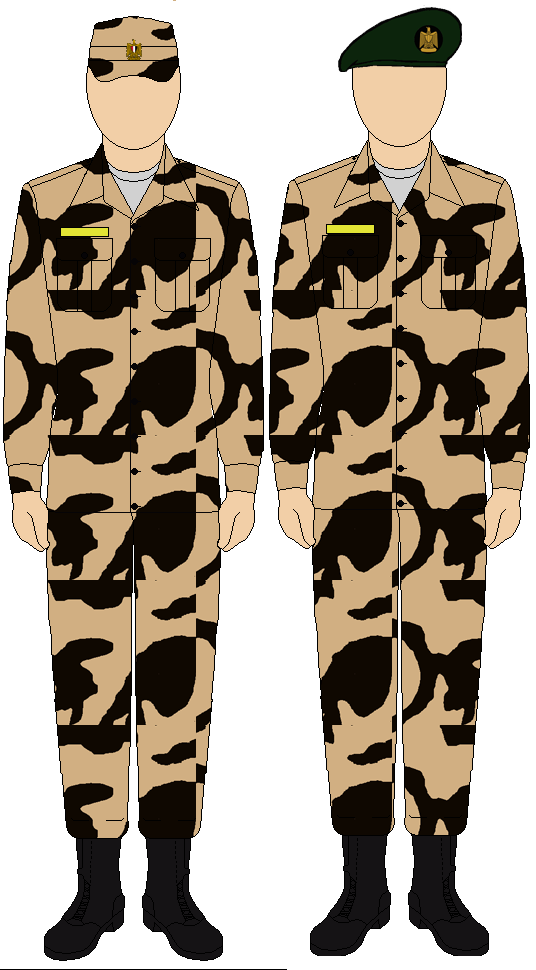
Camouflage pattern used in El Saa‘qa uniforms.

=== Historical ===
Israeli military historian Dani Asher wrote in 2009 that at the outbreak of the October War the Egyptian Army fielded twenty-four commando battalions, organized into six groups of three to five battalions each. These formations were supported by a battalion equipped with Sagger anti-tank missiles and a unit of BM-21 122 mm rocket launchers.

Most sources follow Trevor Dupuy in identifying the commando brigades as the 127th, 128th, 129th, 130th, 131st, 132nd, and 134th. Asher instead refers to six commando groups, each brigade-sized, though he does not list them individually. Arab sources mention the 39th, 127th, 129th, 136th, 139th, and 145th Groups. The 127th Brigade also appears in the Defense Intelligence Agency's declassified order of battle for 1967.

=== Contemporary ===
El Saa‘qa Forces consists of eight special forces regiments or groups at brigade level (117th, 123rd, 129th, 135th, 141st, 147th, 153rd, and 159th) under a single headquarters. Three of these are El Saa‘qa regiments, three are commando regiments, and the remaining two comprise marine commandos and infiltration/counterterrorism units. The branch also includes 18 commando battalions (230th–247th) organized into 72 companies, three marine commando battalions (515th, 616th, 818th) with 12 companies, and three infiltration/counterterrorism battalions (777th, 888th, 999th) with 12 companies.

==== Specialized counterterrorism units ====
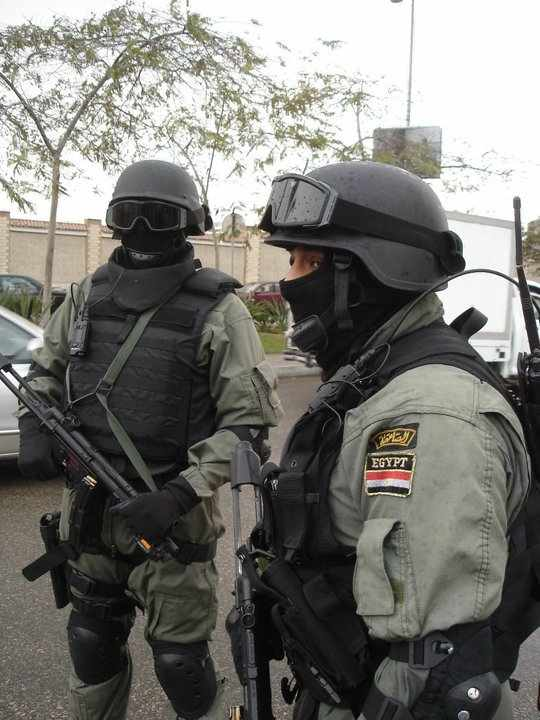
Members of Unit 777 counterterrorism force.

The El Saa‘qa Forces were used as the foundation for two specialized counterterrorism units in response to a global rise in airline hijackings: Unit 777 and Unit 999. Unit 777, also called Task Force 777, conducted operations to liberate hostages in 1976, 1978, and 1985. While the first mission succeeded, the latter two ended in heavy casualties, resulting in a temporary disbandment by President Hosni Mubarak after the 1985 failure.

Unit 999 was envisioned as a more military-oriented counterpart but remained largely inactive for nearly three decades. Its first significant deployments occurred after the 2011 uprising, primarily for protecting state facilities.

==== Marine commandos ====
The 153rd Group includes three Marine Commando Battalions, the 515th, 616th, and 818th, which collectively oversee twelve companies. These units serve as Egypt’s naval special forces and are generally regarded as the equivalent of the United States Navy SEALs, though they are distinct from the army’s El Sa‘aqa Forces and Unit 777.

The marine commandos operate primarily in support of the 130th Amphibious Brigade, conducting missions such as beach reconnaissance for amphibious landings, long-range reconnaissance to identify enemy defenses and targets, and special operations including attacks on enemy supply lines, bases, and officers. They are trained in small-boat and airborne insertion and make use of Western-supplied equipment and weaponry, giving the Egyptian Navy a significant special operations capability.

The modern naval commando force was first established under the supervision of the El Saa‘qa units at the Inshas training school. Officers are selected from the El Saa‘qa Forces, parachute units, and naval brigades to form the nucleus of the force. Training lasts for 34 weeks without interruption and includes medical screening, combat swimming, underwater demolition, airborne operations, endurance training, and defensive and offensive diving using closed-circuit diving systems.

== Bibliography ==
- Gawrych, George Walter (2000). The albatross of decisive victory: war and policy between Egypt and Israel in the 1967 and 1973 Arab-Israeli wars. Greenwood Publishing Group. ISBN 978-0-313-31302-8.
- Ryan, Mann and Stillwell (2003). The Encyclopedia of the World's Special Forces. ISBN 0-7607-3939-0
