= Battle of the Chinese Farm =

1973 battle of the Yom Kippur War

- Part of the Yom Kippur War
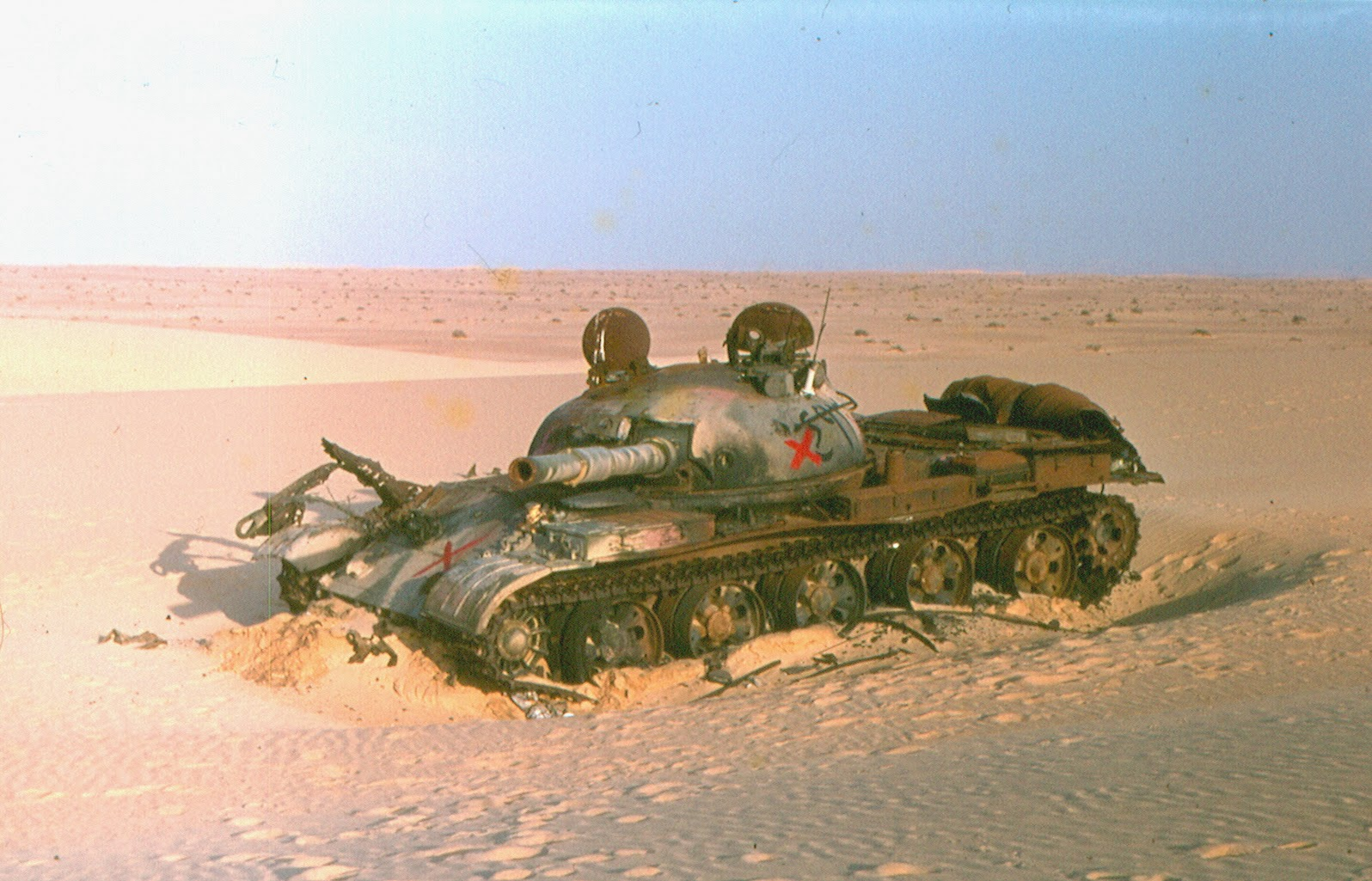
- Destroyed Egyptian tank.
Date	October 15–17, 1973
Location	North of the Great Bitter Lake and east of the Suez Canal, Sinai Peninsula, Egypt 30°27′N 32°24′E
Result	Israeli victory

Belligerents
Egypt	Israel

Commanders and leaders
Abd Rab el-Nabi Hafez; Ibrahim El-Orabi; Abd el-Hamid Abd el-Sami'; Sayed Saleh	Ariel Sharon; Avraham Adan; Amnon Reshef; Uzi Yairi

Strength
One infantry brigade One mechanized brigade Two understrength armored brigades 136 tanks	One reinforced armored brigade Initially 97 tanks, later: One armored division and one paratrooper brigade

Casualties and losses
Heavy	Heavy
- Location within Egypt

The Battle of the Chinese Farm took place during October 15 to October 17, 1973 between the Egyptian Army and the Israel Defense Forces (IDF), as part of the Yom Kippur War. It was fought in the Sinai Peninsula, north of the Great Bitter Lake and just east of the Suez Canal, near an Egyptian agricultural research station. The area was known to the Israeli military as the Chinese Farm – a misnomer resulting from the research station's use of Japanese-made equipment, with Japanese writing on the machinery mistaken by Israeli observers for Chinese.

Combat began when the IDF launched Operation Abiray-Lev ("Knights of the Heart"): an attempt to establish a corridor to the canal, and allow bridges to be laid for a crossing. Under Abiray-Lev, the Israelis attacked Egyptian forces in and around the Chinese Farm.

Determined Egyptian resistance made progress extremely slow for the Israelis, who suffered heavy losses. The Israelis were repeatedly reinforced with armor but were unable to make much headway, only managing to seize an important crossroad on the second day. Suffering from a lack of infantry, the Israelis brought up paratroopers during the night of October 16–17. They were tasked with clearing anti-tank defenses for the armor, but they became pinned down by heavy Egyptian fire. The paratroopers drew Egyptian attention long enough for the Israelis to move bridging equipment to the canal undetected. Armored forces later extricated the paratroopers.

The Egyptians attempted to restore their defenses to their initial dispositions with an armored attack on October 17. It initially succeeded, but was pushed back by Israeli counterattacks in an armored battle lasting the entire day. Seriously depleted by the continuous fighting, the Egyptians relinquished control of the routes to the canal, opening them up to the Israelis. The battle is remembered as one of the most costly and brutal battles of the war.

== Background ==
On October 6, 1973, Egypt launched Operation Badr, intending to cross the Suez Canal and establish bridgeheads on the opposite bank of the Sinai Peninsula, which had been occupied by Israel since 1967. Coordinated with a Syrian assault on the Golan Heights, the crossing achieved tactical surprise and was a success. Thereafter, counterattacks by Israeli reserves were unsuccessful. By October 10, fighting along the front had come to a lull. The Egyptians dug in and hoped to wear down the Israelis by attrition, while remaining within range of their ground surface-to-air missiles, which provided air cover from the west bank of the canal, while the Israelis focused on directing their main efforts against the Syrians in the Golan and reorganizing their battered forces. Israeli failures led to the replacement of the chief of the Israeli Southern Command, Major General Shmuel Gonen, with Chaim Bar-Lev, although Gonen was retained as his aide.

The situation changed when Sadat, in the face of protests from his senior commanders, ordered an offensive to seize the strategic Sinai mountain passes, hoping to relieve Israeli pressure on the Syrians. The resulting offensive was ill-planned and ill-executed, culminating in heavy Egyptian losses without achieving any of its objectives. This gave the Israelis the initiative to launch a counteroffensive.

On October 14, immediately following the Egyptian offensive, Israeli Chief of Staff David Elazar presented the general outlines of a crossing operation of the Suez Canal to the Israeli cabinet in a meeting in Tel Aviv. Elazar emphasized the military and political gains of the operation, and the expected collapse that would occur in the Egyptian forces on the east bank when their supply routes became threatened. Elazar received unanimous support from the cabinet. Later that day, Bar-Lev headed a meeting attended by the senior and main division commanders in the Sinai theatre: Major Generals Abraham Adan, Ariel Sharon and Kalman Magen. Bar-Lev informed the Israeli officers of the decision to begin the crossing operation on the night of October 15/16, and assigned duties and responsibilities to the division commanders.

== Operation Abirey-Lev ==
According to the plan set for the Israeli crossing, Operation Abirey-Halev (Hebrew for "Knights of the Heart"), the designated crossing point lay near to Deversoir, at the northern end of the Great Bitter Lake on the Suez Canal. The Israelis had to open the principal route to Deversoir and secure a corridor stretching 5 kilometers (3.1 mi) north of the crossing site (known as "The Yard"). Paratroopers and armor would then cross the canal to establish a 5-kilometer-deep bridgehead (3.1 mi), after which the bridges would be laid, with at least one to be operational by the morning of October 16. The Israelis would then cross to the west bank and attack south and west, with the end goal of reaching Suez, thus encircling and cutting off two Egyptian divisions on the east bank. Southern Command allotted 24 hours for the setting up of the bridgehead and 24 hours for Israeli forces to reach Suez, with the latter expected to be under Israeli control by October 18 at the latest. It would soon be shown that the execution of Operation Stouthearted Men would deviate from planning and schedules and that the time-frame had been highly optimistic and extremely unrealistic.

=== Order of Battle ===
Major General Ariel Sharon's 143rd Armored Division was given the critical tasks of opening the corridors and laying the bridges. His division included Tuvia Raviv's 600th Armored Brigade, Colonel Amnon Reshef's 14th Armored Brigade, and the 'Haim' Brigade commanded by Colonel Haim Erez. Major General Abraham Adan's 162nd Armored Division was tasked with crossing the canal and achieving an encirclement with its 300 tanks. The division included Colonel Natke Nir's 217th Armored Brigade, Colonel Gabi Amir's 460th Armored Brigade and Aryeh Keren's 500th Armored Brigade. A paratrooper brigade would be transferred to Adan's division during the course of the battle. Kalman Magen's 252nd Armored Division would initially launch diversionary attacks elsewhere to draw attention from Sharon's operations at Deversoir. Thereafter the division would hold and secure the corridor and bridgehead.

Egyptian forces in the area formed the southern flank of the Second Field Army. These units were the 21st Armoured Division, commanded by Brigadier General Ibrahim Oraby, and the 16th Infantry Division, commanded by Brigadier General Abd Rab el-Nabi Hafez. In addition to being the division commander, Hafez also commanded forces within his division's bridgehead, which included the 21st Division. Oraby's unit included the 1st Armored Brigade, under Colonel Sayed Saleh; the 14th Armored Brigade, under Colonel Othman Kamel; and the 18th Mechanized Brigade, under Colonel Talaat Muslim. Hafez's 16th Division included the 16th Infantry Brigade, commanded by Colonel Abd el-Hamid Abd el-Sami', as well as the 116th Infantry and the 3rd Mechanized Brigades.

=== Location of battle and deployment of forces ===
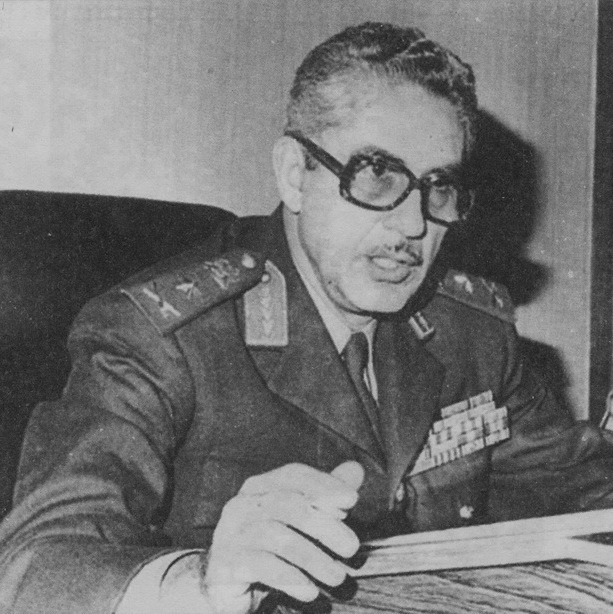
A post-war photograph of Brigadier General Abd Rab el-Nabi Hafez (Lieutenant-General at the time of the photograph), who commanded all Egyptian forces in the 16th Infantry Division's bridgehead during the battle. He was wounded by shrapnel from Israeli artillery on October 18, and was succeeded by his chief of staff.

Two main roads led to Deversoir. The first was the Tasa-Tel Salam Road, codenamed Akavish by the Israelis. This road connected Artillery Road (running north to south 15 kilometers (9.3 mi) east of the canal) to Lexicon Road (running north to south directly east of the canal). The Lexicon-Akavish junction fell on Tel Salaam, near the Great Bitter Lake and 6 kilometers (3.7 mi) south of Deveroir, where Fort Lakekan (part of the Bar Lev Line) was located. The second road, codenamed Tirtur, ran north of Akavish. It too connected Artillery Road to Lexicon, but provided a direct route to "the Yard". The Lexicon-Tirtur junction fell on Fort Matzmed. This fortification, which consisted of two strongpoints 500 meters (1,600 ft) apart, had been captured on October 9 by a small assault force, while Fort Lakekan had been evacuated without any combat on October 8. The importance of both fortifications lay in their control of the Lexicon-Akavish and Lexicon-Tirtur junctions. Both forts, however, were in the designated buffer zone, 35 kilometers (22 mi) long, between the Second and Third Armies. It was believed this area would not need defending, as it was both adjacent to the Great Bitter Lake, a natural obstacle, and most of it lay outside the range of the Egyptian SAMs. Thus they were left unoccupied by the local Egyptian commander, who chose not to extend his defenses southwards. The Egyptian negligence to occupy and defend both forts would greatly assist the Israelis in Operation Stouthearted Men.

Just north of the Lexicon-Tirtur junction was the village of al-Galaa. Prior to the 1967 Six-Day War, the village had been the site of an agricultural project. This agricultural station incorporated several irrigation ditches and specialized Japanese-made machinery. When the Sinai came under Israeli occupation, Israeli soldiers saw the Kanji characters on the equipment and labeled the area as 'Chinese Farm' on military maps. Just north and north-west of Chinese Farm was a hill mass known by its Israeli codename 'Missouri'. During Operation Badr, al-Galaa and the Chinese Farm fell within the designated bridgehead of the 16th Infantry Division. Abd el-Hamid's 16th Infantry Brigade occupied and defended these locations. After partaking in the initial canal-crossing, the brigade, along with the rest of the division, faced an attack by Raviv's brigade on October 9. The Israelis achieved some initial gains, but were repelled by the end of the day. Also located within 16th Division's bridgehead, as of October 13, was the 21st Armoured Division. Its units were positioned in the center and the north of the bridgehead. The 14th Brigade had been involved in the crossing and, along with the 1st Brigade, participated in the Egyptian offensive on October 14; as a result, it had lost half of its operational tank strength. In the aftermath, Oraby's efforts to reorganize and replace armored losses were hampered by frequent artillery barrages and air strikes. On October 15, there were 136 tanks in the Egyptian bridgehead, unevenly split among Oraby's brigades: 66 with the 1st Armored Brigade, 39 with the 14th Armored Brigade, and 31 in the 18th Mechanized Brigade. Despite their heavy losses, the Egyptian forces in the bridgehead outnumbered Reshef's force.

Early on the morning of October 15, Adan moved his division from its positions in the north to a concentration area west of Tasa in preparation for the crossing. Sharon's division had been in the central sector since its arrival at the Sinai Front, along with the crossing equipment and bridges since October 13. Sharon had his headquarters in Tasa, 40 kilometers (25 mi) east of the canal.

=== Israeli plan and initial maneuvers ===
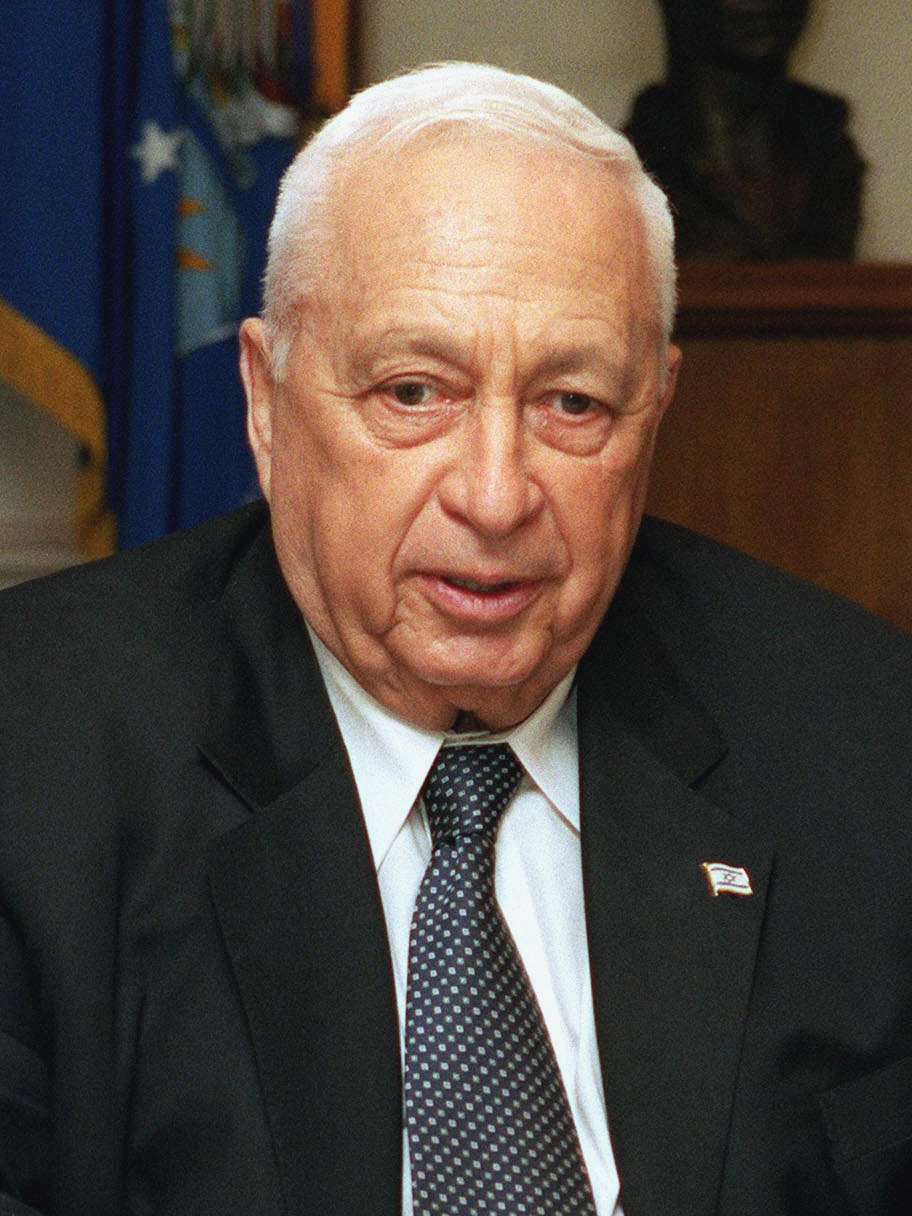
Major General Ariel Sharon, commander of the 143rd Armored Division, photographed here as Prime Minister of Israel.

After receiving his orders late on October 14 from Bar-Lev, Sharon headed to his headquarters to prepare for the operation. His division incorporated Raviv's Brigade, Colonel Amnon Reshef's 14th Armored Brigade, and the 'Haim' Brigade commanded by Colonel Haim Erez. Attached to his division was the 243rd Paratrooper Brigade commanded by Colonel Dani Matt.

Sharon planned for Raviv's brigade to attack from the east, diverting Egyptian attention away from Deversoir. Erez was tasked with transporting a pre-constructed roller bridge to the crossing area at Deversoir, while one of his tank battalions would be attached to the paratroopers. Colonel Reshef was given the most critical tasks of all. Accordingly, his brigade was heavily reinforced to incorporate four armored and three mechanized infantry battalions, in addition to the division's reconnaissance battalion, commanded by Lieutenant Colonel Yaov Brom. His brigade would conduct a turning maneuver at 6:00 am on October 15 south of Akavish Road, move through the sand dunes to reach Fort Lakekan, before heading north to occupy Fort Matzmed. Reshef's brigade would then split up to clear the Akavish and Titur Roads and seize the Chinese Farm, while occupying the crossing area and awaiting Matt's brigade. Matt's paratrooper brigade, containing an additional tank company and the armored battalion, would move south-west via Akavish to reach Fort Matzmed. From there, it would continue on to the Yard and cross the canal at 11:00 pm, using rubber dinghies and rafts for the tanks.

Matt's brigade began moving to Tasa at 4:30 pm on October 15, before turning eastwards on Akavish. (Note: The paratrooper brigade faced problems in acquiring the boats and transports assigned to it. Of 60 half-tracks assigned to the brigade, only 32 were received. Matt resorted to commandeering another 26 half-tracks at Refidem (Bir Gifgafa), that were destined for another unit. The paratroopers acquired their assigned boats, 60 in all, after learning they had been sent by error to an area 5 kilometres (3.1 mi) north of Tasa, the result of a mix-up in area code-names.) Heavy congestion on the roads made the brigade's progress very slow. A little after midnight, the brigade left Akavish and moved westward to the Yard, an area 700 meters long and 150 meters wide surrounded by protective sand walls. The site had been made long before the war.

Reshef maneuvered his brigade as planned, entering into the previously discovered gap without any opposition. Leaving a combined recon and paratrooper force at the canal, he sent his tanks north and west to secure the flank of the projected crossing site and clear the Akavish and Tirtur roads from behind for the follow-on bridging equipment. He seized the Lakekan and Matzmed fortifications without resistance. Reshef informed Sharon that the forts were under control and that Akavish was clear. Sharon in turn informed Southern Command of these successes, sending a wave of jubilation through the Israeli commanders, delighted that the operation had begun so smoothly.

== Battle ==
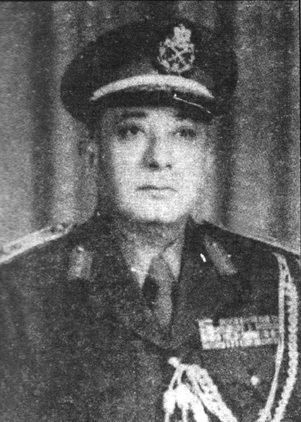
Colonel Abd el-Hamid Abd el-Sami', commander of the 16th Infantry Brigade. As of the night of October 15/16, his unit bore the main brunt of Israeli attacks throughout the battle.

Matt had been informed that the crossing area and its environs were clear of Egyptian forces, but out of caution, ordered his tank company to deploy at the Lexicon-Tirtur junction to confront any Egyptian movements towards the crossing site, just 800 meters (2,600 ft) south of the crossroads. The entire company was wiped out after it was ambushed by Egyptian infantry of the 16th Brigade. The company commander was killed and most of his men were casualties, unbeknownst to Matt. Meanwhile, Israeli artillery batteries opened fire on the landing site on the west bank, delivering around 70 tons of shells and ordnance. In fact, the opposite bank was completely clear of Egyptian troops. The crossing finally got underway at 1:35 am, over five hours behind schedule. By 9:00 am, 2,000 paratroopers had crossed, along with a battalion of thirty tanks. The Israelis sent raiding parties attacking Egyptian SAMs on the west bank, while securing a 4-kilometer-deep bridgehead (2.5 mi) without facing resistance.

Tuvia Raviv's armored brigade began its diversionary attack against the 16th Division's bridgehead at 5:00 pm on October 15, striking at the bridgehead's center from the east, after a fire preparation. It was repulsed by the Egyptians, as had been expected, but succeeded in its purpose. When the 16th Division's southern flank came under increasing Israeli attack, the Egyptians assumed that the Israeli objective was to roll up the Second Army's right flank, not to open a corridor to the west bank for Israeli forces to cross the canal. For the next 24 hours, this remained the general impression among Egyptian commanders, and they reacted accordingly. Had they discovered the Israelis' true intentions earlier, the Egyptians would almost certainly have been able to defeat the Israeli operation, in light of the greater strength of their forces and reserves near the Deversoir area, on the east and west banks of the Suez Canal.

=== Lexicon-Tirtur junction ===
While the paratroopers prepared to cross, Reshef was informed that Akavish had been closed again by Egyptian infantry units soon after his passing. He sent one armored battalion to clear the road and committed his remaining three armored and three mechanized battalions to push northwards and secure Tirtur and the Chinese Farm.

An infantry battalion, forming the right flank of Abd el-Hamid's 16th Brigade, was in position to defend the Lexicon-Tirtur crossroads. Initially, Reshef sent two armored battalions northward on Lexicon. As the Israeli tanks neared the infantry battalion, they were met by heavy fire from anti-tank weapons. They lost 27 tanks during this engagement, although seven Israeli tanks managed to break through the battalion's westernmost position on Lexicon and advance northwards to al-Galaa'. Thereafter, 'Abd el-Hamid ordered tank-hunting squads – groups of ten equipped with RPG-7 rockets and RPG-43 grenades – to deploy around al-Galaa' and destroy those tanks that broke through; he also sent a tank company to reinforce the infantry battalion.

At night, Reshef moved with his remaining forces north along the canal bank. Bypassing the 16th Brigade's positions, the Israelis soon found themselves in the center of a huge administrative area and vehicle park. Reshef's brigade had stumbled into the command and supply bases of the Egyptian 16th and 21st Divisions. The base was located near the canal on the assumption that it was the safest location from Israeli attacks, which was expected to come from the east, where the defenses were the strongest, not from the south, where they were the weakest. Both sides immediately opened fire, inadvertently leading to the destruction of supply trucks and SAM launchers. The Egyptians managed to organize a counterattack by units of the 21st Division; a battalion of the 14th Brigade and a battalion (less one company) of the 18th Brigade. The tanks repelled the Israelis, who sustained significant losses from vastly overwhelming opposing forces.

Brigadier General Hafez, commanding the 16th Infantry Division, planned to contain the Israeli attack from the south by having the 18th Mechanized Brigade occupy defenses north of the Chinese Farm, directly behind the 16th Infantry Brigade, but without its organic tank battalion, which was designated as part of the division's reserve. The 1st Armored Brigade moved southward to occupy positions between Lateral Road and the canal on the right flank of the 18th Brigade. Upon the brigade's arrival, it engaged Israeli armor from Reshef's brigade in al-Galaa'; Egyptian armor destroyed around 15 tanks and several half-tracks. At around 1:00 pm, sorties of Egyptian Su-7s destroyed many Israeli tanks in ground-attack missions over al-Galaa' village. The 1st Brigade countered a flanking attempt on its left at 2:00 pm by a tank battalion, thwarting the attack and destroying ten tanks. During its engagements on October 16, the 21st Division managed to destroy over 50 Israeli tanks and APCs, while subjected to frequent Israeli air strikes and artillery barrages. The 1st Brigade accounted for most of the kills, while suffering fewer losses. (Note: On October 17 the 1st Armored Brigade had 53 tanks remaining, after losing 13 tanks.)

Meanwhile, one of Reshef's mechanized battalions, commanded by Major Nathan Shunari, was reinforced with company-sized remnants of the 40th Tank Battalion, now commanded by Captain Gideon Giladi after the previous battalion commander had been wounded. Shunari was ordered to seize the Lexicon-Tirtur junction. He sent the tank company ahead first, which initially reported no Egyptian units. Shunari dispatched an infantry unit in six half-tracks to the junction. Upon reaching it, they discovered that the tank company had already been destroyed and Giladi killed. Soon the vehicles began to come under heavy fire, stopping their advance. The unit commander reported casualties, and Shunari ordered the remainder of his battalion to aid the pinned-down men. Attempts to rescue the infantry failed, and the Egyptian battalion defending the junction directed heavy firepower against the area, aided by the brigade's artillery. The Egyptian defenders had managed to catch the Israelis in a prepared killing zone. Shunari, whose troops lacked cover and were threatened with annihilation, regrouped some of his forces and managed to escape the area in vehicles, but the infantry half-track unit first sent to the crossroads remained pinned down.

Reshef sent another tank company to rescue the infantrymen. The tanks advanced towards the Chinese Farm from the south. As they neared the farm and the village, a downpour of anti-tank and artillery fire forced the company to retreat. Nathan kept pleading with Rehsef to send additional support, unaware he was facing superior Egyptian forces after entering the administrative bases of the Egyptian 16th and 21st Divisions. With no help coming, the unit commander had his men carry the wounded and attempted to leave the battlefield, tasking two sections of heavy machine guns with providing cover to the force. As the Israelis slowly made their way back to their lines, a group of Egyptian tanks intercepted and wiped out the Israeli force.

Despite the debacle, Reshef remained determined to seize the junction, giving the task to the division's reconnaissance battalion attached to his brigade. To achieve surprise, the battalion maneuvered to attack at 3:00 am from the west, as the Egyptians were preparing for further attacks from the south and east. As the Israelis attacked, Lieutenant Colonel Brom was killed barely thirty meters from Egyptian positions, disrupting his battalion's assault. The Israelis sustained losses, but managed to retreat. Soon after, a tank company attacked the crossroads at 4:00 am on October 16, but also withdrew after losing three tanks.

By 4:00 am on October 16, Reshef's brigade, which had begun the operation with 97 tanks, had lost 56 in just twelve hours of fighting, leaving only 41 remaining. Although seizing the crossing site had been accomplished easily, stiff resistance had prevented Reshef from achieving his remaining objectives, namely opening the routes to the canal and securing a corridor. Reshef's force would further drop to just 27 tanks by noon. As a whole, Sharon's division suffered some 300 killed and 1,000 wounded that night. To help Reshef secure the corridor, Sharon supplied him with two tank battalions by 6:00 pm, propping his numbers up to 81 tanks.

Hearing reports of the heavy fighting taking place between the junction and the Chinese Farm, Dayan suggested withdrawing Matt's brigade and canceling the operation. He voiced concerns that the paratroopers were threatened with annihilation and noted that all attempts to open a corridor for the bridges had failed. Gonen rejected the suggestion, stating that, "If we knew in advance this was going to happen we would not have started the crossing operation, but now that we have crossed then let us follow through to the bitter end." Bar-Lev concurred with Gonen, and Dayan decided not to press his suggestion. At around 6:00 am, Golda Meir telephoned Dayan to inquire about the situation. Dayan informed her that the bridges had not yet been laid and that the Egyptians had closed the routes leading to Deveroir. He also stated there were high hopes that Egyptian resistance would be overcome and that the bridges would be laid during the morning. Dayan also told her that Matt's paratrooper brigade had crossed to the west bank without encountering resistance and that Southern Command, as yet, had no intentions of withdrawing the brigade, even if the bridge-laying was delayed.

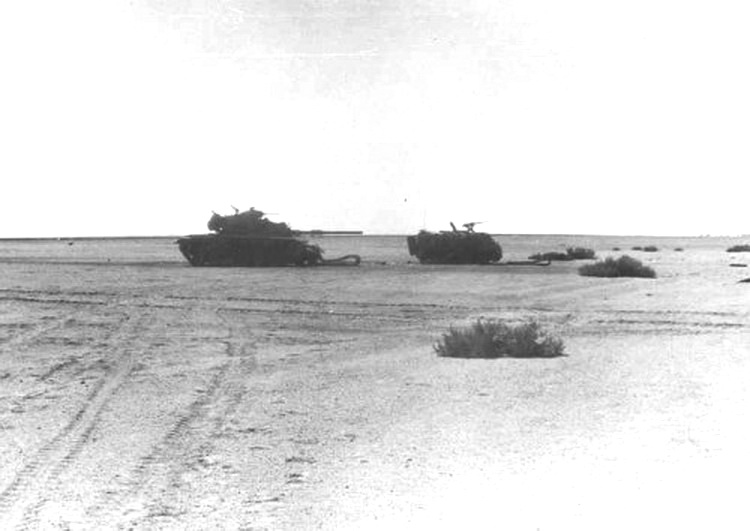
Israeli armor knocked out near the Lexicon-Tirtur Junction.

Shortly after dawn, Reshef conducted a reconnaissance of the battlefield from a hilltop. He saw that the Egyptians had set up a strong blocking position defending the junction, composed of Egyptian tanks situated in hull-down positions and infantrymen in foxholes and the now-dry irrigation ditches of the Chinese Farm. The infantry were from the 16th Brigade's right-flank battalion and had the support of recoilless rifles, RPG-7s, and some manually guided AT-3 Sagger missiles. Reshef discovered that the Egyptians had mined both sides of Lexicon Road, to which he had lost several of his tanks.

Reshef decided to change tactics. He personally commanded the 40th Armored Battalions, after reinforcing it with tanks salvaged and repaired from the previous night's fighting, and maneuvered to attack from the west – from the direction of the canal – hitting Egyptian positions in the flank, while a tank company and an infantry company attacked from south to north. Reshef's forces engaged the Egyptians from long range, picking off defensive positions from afar, while using alternate fire and movement to advance to the crossroads. The defending infantry battalion, exhausted by continuous fighting and suffering from a severe lack of ammunition, soon withdrew allowing the Israelis to at last seize the junction.

In the meantime, other difficulties were surfacing. Sharon reported to Southern Command that one section of the roller bridge, being towed by Erez's brigade, had been damaged and that the engineers needed a few hours to repair it. He also requested additional forces to help secure the corridor, noting the stiff resistance facing Reshef's brigade. Sharon's report prompted Bar-Lev to alert Adan to prepare to open the corridor with his division. Sharon argued for Adan's division to cross the canal on rafts and to proceed with Operation Abiray-Lev without waiting for the bridges. Both Gonen and Bar-Lev rejected Sharon's suggestion since, without a secure corridor to the canal, Israeli forces on the west bank would be threatened with encirclement. Subsequently, Bar-Lev ordered that no more Israeli forces or equipment would cross to the west bank until the bridges had been laid.

After receiving reinforcements, Reshef focused on clearing the Tirtur Road. He left a battalion of around 30 tanks between the junction and the western part of the Chinese Farm, and prepared to attack with two armored battalions provided by Sharon. He concentrated on the section of the Tirtur Road defended by an Egyptian battalion forming the left flank of the 16th Infantry Brigade. One of Reshef's battalions attacked from the north-east, the other from the west. The Egyptian battalion managed to halt the advance, aided by fire from tanks and anti-tank weapons on the slopes of Missouri, a hill north-west of the Chinese Farm, causing Reshef to break off his attack.

This last attempt left Reshef's brigade in a desperate situation. He had 27 tanks remaining and was running short on ammunition and supplies. Reshef requested authorization from Sharon to withdraw his brigade to Fort Lakekan to regroup his forces and regain combat effectiveness.

=== Israeli reinforcement ===
The unexpected Egyptian resistance forced Israeli Southern Command to change its plans. Visiting Adan's advance command post, Gonen noted that "Sharon has disappointed us" and handed Adan the task of moving the pontoon bridge to the canal. Adan was to prepare to clear the Akavish and Tirtur Roads to deploy the bridges. Gonen informed Sharon of Adan's new orders and tasked Sharon with capturing the Chinese Farm and Egyptian positions near the farm and the canal. Needing to regroup his forces, Sharon suggested that he capture the farm once Adan had cleared the routes to the canal, and Gonen consented. In a later meeting with Dayan and Bar-Lev, Gonen reiterated the latter's statement that no more forces would cross until the bridges had been laid, and added that, should the situation worsen, the paratroopers could be withdrawn.

The 162nd Division, concentrated south of Tasa, had been standing by to cross the canal since dawn on October 16. The division advanced towards the canal, but movement was hampered by the massive traffic jams on the roads leading to the canal. When Adan realized that Akavish was closed, he ordered a tank battalion to make a turning maneuver through the desert to reach Deversoir. When it arrived, Sharon contacted Adan, explaining Reshef's difficult situation, and requested that the battalion be placed under his command. Adan accepted, and Sharon in turn authorized Reshef's request to pull back and regroup, replacing his brigade with the tank battalion.

After receiving his new orders, Adan moved his division to occupy a series of positions opposite 'Abd el-Hamid's 16th Brigade. One of Adan's armored brigades had been placed as a reserve force under Southern Command. 'Abd el-Hamid's left-flank infantry battalion, blocking Tirtur, repelled Israeli tanks attacking westwards and thwarted Adan's efforts to clear the road. Adan realized that, without infantry support, breaking through the Egyptian positions would prove costly. However, at 2:00 pm, Southern Command notified Adan that he would soon receive the 35th Paratrooper Brigade, which had been transported by helicopters from Ras Sudar on the Gulf of Suez to Refidem 80 kilometers (50 mi) east of the canal. The brigade made its way to the canal in buses and was greatly delayed by the traffic on Akavish road. Adan had expected the unit to arrive well before dusk, but the brigade commander, Colonel Uzi Ya'iri, only arrived at 10:00 pm. The rest of his brigade soon arrived, transported by helicopters after the buses had come to a complete standstill.

=== Paratrooper effort ===
Adan met Ya'iri at Adan's former command post. Adan briefly explained the situation and, in a short discussion, Ya'iri laid out his plan. He was tasked with clearing Akavish and Tirtur. At 11:30 pm, the paratroopers began moving, with a battalion under Lieutenant Colonel Yitzhak Mordechai spearheading the advance. Ya'iri, acting with a sense of urgency, had decided to go into action without awaiting sufficient intelligence, or performing adequate reconnaissance on Egyptian defenses. His unit lacked artillery observers and, rather than wait for one to arrive, it was agreed the paratroopers would request fire support of the 162nd Division's command net. The brigade was acting without armor support.

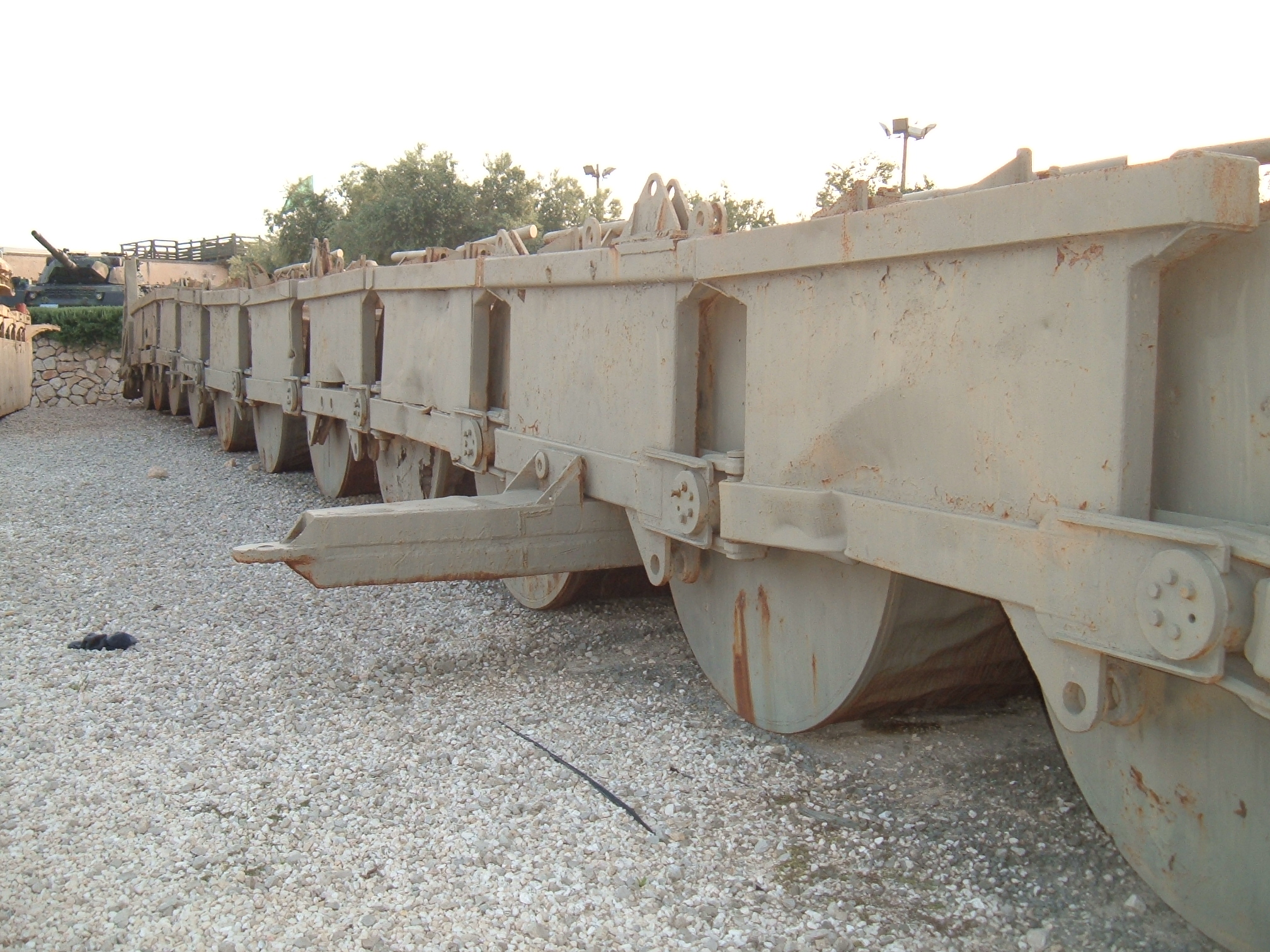
The Israeli "roller bridge", designed to be swiftly deployed on the canal. The fighting at the Chinese Farm meant the bridge reached the canal only after the pontoon bridge had already been deployed.

After some time, Mordechai's battalion had reached an area where Tirtur and Akavish were closest, the distance between them no wider than 2 kilometers (1.2 mi). At around 2:45 am, they came into contact with Abd el-Hamid's left-flank battalion, positioned around Tirtur. The battalion directed effective artillery fire against the paratroopers, who were also receiving heavy machine-gun and small-arms fire from entrenched Egyptian infantry. The paratroopers attempted to assault the machine-gun positions, in places advancing to within a few meters of Egyptian lines. The paratrooper companies spread out, but repeatedly failed to reach the defenses. Israeli artillery fire was ineffective. Egyptian infantry were able to suppress the paratroopers' movement and thwart flanking attempts. Most company and platoon commanders were killed or wounded. Adan ordered Ya'iri to narrow his brigade's front and focus on clearing Akavish instead, but the lead paratrooper battalion was under such heavy fire that it was impossible to maneuver.

With dawn nearing, Adan realized that if the pontoon bridge could not be brought to the canal during the few remaining hours of dark, an entire day would pass without a bridge being laid across the canal, and in daylight, the paratroopers would sustain more casualties. He sent a half-track company to reconnoiter Akavish at 3:00. Half an hour later, the company reported it had reached the crossing site without encountering any resistance. The Egyptian battalion fighting the paratroopers had focused all their attention on the Israelis at Tirtur, ignoring activity on Akavish. Adan took a risky decision, sending the irreplaceable pontoons down Akavish to the canal. IDF bulldozers cleared the road of wreckage and debris, and the Israelis reached Fort Lakekan before turning northwards, finally reaching the crossing site. Bridge construction was started immediately by military engineers of the 143rd Division.

At dawn, Ya'iri requested approval from Adan to withdraw his brigade, the paratroopers having thus far been unsuccessful in reaching Egyptian lines. Gonen denied the request, approving only medevac for the wounded. This was countermanded after Bar-Lev visited Adan at his command post and realized the gravity of the paratroopers' situation. An armored battalion was tasked with covering the paratroopers, but was unable to locate them. The paratroopers released red smoke to pinpoint their position, but this backfired as the Egyptians also spotted the smoke, directing accurate artillery fire against them and inflicting further casualties. The tanks assaulted the defenses, but suffered losses and fell back. It became evident that withdrawal could not be accomplished in the open; APCs and half-tracks were brought up to extract the paratroopers and the wounded—all the while under fire. The Israelis finally withdrew under cover of friendly tanks. In 14 hours of almost uninterrupted combat, the paratroopers suffered heavy casualties, with some 40–70 killed and 100 wounded. Ya'iri would state that "We had suffered seventy casualties because we went into action too hastily, without proper intelligence on the enemy's defenses." Armored losses sustained during the withdrawal were also heavy.

=== Egyptian withdrawal ===
The Israeli armored brigades, principally those of Nir, Amir and Raviv, continued engaging the 16th Brigade after the paratroopers were withdrawn. The Israelis concentrated air and artillery attacks against 21st Division's units from 5:00 am. The Egyptians estimated there were upwards of 80 Israeli tanks attacking their positions. At around 7:00 am on October 17, the 21st Division received orders to evict Israeli armor from the vicinity of al-Galaa' village and capture Fort Matzmed, as part of a larger Egyptian effort to seal the Israeli penetration and destroy the bridgehead on the west bank. Since Oraby had the 18th Mechanized Brigade in defensive positions and stripped of its tank battalion, and the 14th Brigade defending other parts of the Egyptian bridgehead, he tasked the 1st Brigade to execute the attack with its remaining 53 tanks. At 8:00 am, the Egyptians conducted an air and artillery strike on the area for some fifteen minutes, after which the attack commenced. Egyptian tanks managed to destroy Israeli armor near the village and reached the northern strongpoint of Fort Matzmed just after 9:00 am in the face of heavy resistance. However, they were soon repelled by Israeli ground fire supported by air strikes. Israeli tanks then counterattacked and managed to advance significantly. The armored battle continued in a see-saw fashion until 9:00 pm, by which time the 1st Brigade had restored its original lines. Meanwhile, a 5:00 pm attack by one of the 18th Brigade's mechanized infantry battalions on al-Galaa' failed with heavy losses, and ten tanks were then allocated to the brigade. Israeli armor had occupied irrigation ditches around the farm and were entrenched in them, which significantly enhanced their defensive position. Egyptian attacks directed against the Israeli corridor or the bridgehead failed, with heavy losses.

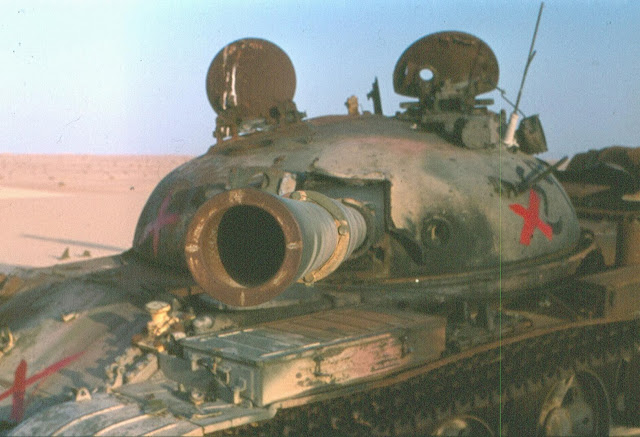
Another angle of the same destroyed tank.

The 1st Brigade had just 33 tanks remaining after losing 20 tanks. This prompted Second Army command to transfer a battalion of 21 tanks on October 18 from the 2nd Infantry Division to the north to reinforce the dwindling tank numbers in 16th Division's bridgehead. As the battalion moved south, a large number of Israeli aircraft attacked the formation, forcing it to undertake evasive maneuvers, turning eastwards and fanning out in the desert terrain, thereby avoiding losses. The battalion was then attached to the 21st Division.

Abd el-Hamid meanwhile reported the dire situation of his forces at 5:30 pm on October 17. The 16th Brigade had been in heavy combat for three consecutive days – ammunition was becoming scarce, and the brigade was heavily outnumbered and outgunned due to its losses, including the destruction of its artillery units. Abd el-Hamid received orders from 16th Division headquarters to retreat. His brigade abandoned its Chinese Farms positions and reinforced the lines of the 18th Mechanized Brigade to the north during the night of October 17/18. This finally opened the Tirtur and Akavish roads to Israeli forces, ensuring Operation Abiray-Lev would proceed. Missouri remained in Egyptian hands though, posing a threat to the Israeli corridor to the canal.

== Aftermath ==
At around 4:00 pm on October 17, the pontoon bridge had been fully assembled, opening the first Israeli bridge across the canal. The roller bridge was laid soon after at dawn on October 18, and by afternoon, Adan's division crossed to the west bank followed by Kalman Magen's division. Adan, supported by Magen, would go on to reach Suez after the failure of a United Nations ceasefire, thereby cutting off two infantry divisions of the Egyptian Third Field Army. Sharon also crossed with part of his division, simultaneously trying to defend and expand the Israeli corridor to the Suez Canal—as well attacking northwards on the west bank to Ismailia in an attempt to similarly cut off the Second Army. His efforts bogged down, and he was unable to reach Ismailia (see Battle of Ismailia), while attempts to seize critical positions and expand the Israeli corridor on the east bank saw little to no success.

While ultimately an Israeli victory, the Battle of the Chinese Farm has an especially infamous legacy among Israeli participants, and it is remembered as one of the most brutal battles of the war—and for the heavy losses incurred by both the Egyptians and Israelis. After the battle had ended, Dayan visited the area of the battlefield. Reshef, who accompanied him, said, "Look at this valley of death." The minister, taken aback by the great destruction before him, muttered in an undertone, "What you people have done here!" Later, Dayan would recount that: "I am no novice at war or battle scenes, but I have never seen such a sight, not in reality, or in paintings, or in the worst war movies. Here was a vast field of slaughter stretching as far as the eye could see." Sharon would also provide his own poignant account of the aftermath: "It was as if a hand-to-hand battle of armor had taken place... Coming close you could see the Egyptian and Jewish dead lying side-by-side, soldiers who had jumped from their burning tanks and died together. No picture could capture the horror of the scene, none could encompass what had happened there."

The losses suffered by both the Egyptians and the Israelis in the battle were severe. Israeli units suffered heavy casualties in men and equipment; Reshef's armored losses during the first night of the battle alone were comparable to Egyptian armored losses on the disastrous October 14 offensive. For their part, the numbers of Egyptian armored forces within 16th Division's bridgehead severely dwindled. As of 18 October the 21st Armoured Division had no more than 40 tanks remaining of an original 136 tanks available at the start of the battle (not counting 21 tanks received as reinforcements), while the 16th Infantry Division had just 20 tanks remaining in its organic tank battalion. This attrition served Egypt's war strategy of inflicting maximum casualties on the Israelis, even though, from another perspective, the initiative had passed to the Israelis during the battle. (Note: Gawrych writes that the 16th Infantry Division's tank force had dropped to 20 from a prewar figure of 124. It should be noted however, that this prewar figure included the tanks of one armored brigade attached to each Egyptian infantry division across the canal. The brigade attached to the 16th Infantry Division was the 14th Armored Brigade, which was in fact part of the 21st Armoured Division.)

=== Notable participants ===
Among the participants of the battle were Mohamed Hussein Tantawi and Ehud Barak, then lieutenant colonels. Tantawi commanded an infantry battalion under the 16th Infantry Brigade. He engaged Reshef's armor during October 16 and later Mordechai's paratroopers during the night of October 16/17, and was decorated for valor during the battle. Barak commanded an armored battalion during the battle and personally led the armored effort to extricate the Israeli paratroopers. Both men would later serve as Ministers of Defense in their respective nations and encounter each other again in that capacity. Another notable participant was future Israeli general and politician Yitzhak Mordechai, then an Israeli paratrooper battalion commander.

== Notes ==
Footnotes

Citations
