= Commanders for Israel's Security =

Israeli movement

- Founded: 2014
- Type: Extra-parliamentary
- Region served: Israel
- Website: en.cis.org.il

"Commanders for Israel's Security" (CIS, Hebrew: מפקדים למען ביטחון ישראל) is an Israeli movement of ex-senior security officials (IDF, Mossad, Shin Bet and Israel Police) that was founded in October 2014, and aims to promote a regional political-security initiative to resolve the Israeli–Palestinian conflict, and to normalize relations with moderate Arab states. The movement is non-partisan but promotes a political goal.

The organization was established by a private and spontaneous initiative, in which a number of senior reserve officers who called on the Prime Minister, Benjamin Netanyahu, to adopt the Arab Peace Initiative as a basis for political negotiations and security, and to advance the peace process.

Among members of the movement, are former IDF Chief of Staff Dan Halutz, former Directors of Mossad Zvi Zamir, Shabtai Shavit, Danny Yatom and Meir Dagan, former Head of the Shin Bet Ami Ayalon, former Air Force Commanders Amos Lapidot and Avihu Ben-Nun, and former Police Commissioners Herzl Shafir, Yaakov Turner and Assaf Hefetz, and many others.

== Activity ==
In February 2015, members of the group expressed criticism of Benjamin Netanyahu's decision to address a joint session of the U.S. Congress, which was arranged without the engagement of U.S. President Barack Obama and his administration. The organization, which includes over 200 retired officers, protested that Netanyahu's speech would damage the relationship between Israel and the United States, Israel's foremost ally. Amnon Reshef, the group's director general, addressing Netanyahu's intent to address concerns about a nuclear Iran, stated, "The way to stop a nuclear Iran is by strengthening ties between countries, between the US and Israel, between Israel and the international community. You can't hide the divide with the Americans and we can't be complacent about it. We believe that this thing is a clear and present danger to the security of Israel." Netanyahu's former commander when he was in the IDF, Amiram Levin, notes that Netanyahu should understand the target is "Tehran, not Washington." Netanyahu's Likud party dismissed the criticism it said came from a group of "leftists."

More recently, two prominent members of the group called for a broader peace under the aegis of a broad alliance of Arab and Muslim-majority nations.
