= Amnon Reshef =

Israeli general

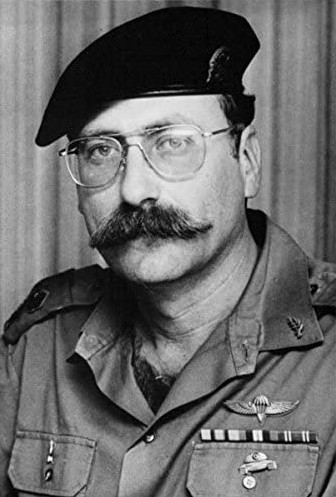

Amnon Reshef (Hebrew: אמנון רשף; born August 29, 1938) is a retired IDF major general who served as 14th Brigade Commander in the Yom Kippur War and as Commanding General of the Armored Corps from 1979 to 1982. In 2014 he founded Commanders for Israel's Security (CIS).

== Biography ==
=== Early life ===
Amnon Reshef (Amnon Isaac) was born in Haifa in 1938 and grew up in Tel Aviv and Bat Yam.

=== Military career ===
In 1956 he was conscripted into the IDF (Israel Defense Forces) and rose through the ranks in the Armored Corps. As a tank platoon commander he took part in Operation Cricket against Tawfik, SYRIA in 1960. In the Six-Day War he served as a general staff officer and acting deputy brigade commander of the 8th Brigade which saw action on the Egyptian and Syrian fronts. After the war he was appointed commander of the 52nd Tank Battalion/14th Brigade, and in 1969, during the War of Attrition, he received command of 189th Reconnaissance Battalion/252nd (Sinai) Division. From 1970 to 1972 he served as a general staff officer in the Armored Corps Headquarters.

In October 1972 Reshef was given command of the 14th Brigade, a tank brigade. On October 6, 1973, at the outbreak of the Yom Kippur War, the 14th was the only armored brigade on the Bar Lev Line. It was deployed along an approximately 200 kilometer (125 miles) front that included more than 100 kilometers of the Suez Canal, and was responsible for the strongholds in the sector. The brigade was the IDF's main force blocking the Egyptian army that had crossed the canal in Operation Badr. It also took part in the blocking maneuver against Egypt's armor thrust on October 14. The brigade played the key role in the crossing battle known as Operation Stouthearted Men and the breakthrough of the Egyptian defense line in the furious battle at the "Chinese Farm". The brigade crossed the Suez Canal on October 19, captured the Orcha locality, and continued fighting in the outskirts of Ismailia until the end of the war. The brigade suffered heavy losses: 390 killed (94 on the first day of the fighting and 121 on the night of the October 15–16 breakthrough) and in the crossing battle in the Chinese Farm area.

In February 1974 Rehsef was promoted to brigadier general and appointed deputy commander of the 162nd ("Steel") Division; later that year he became division commander, a post he served in until 1976. After studies at the Royal College of Defense Studies (RCDS) in London, he served as deputy commander of the Armored Corps, and in early 1979 he became corps commander and was promoted to the rank of major general. In February 1982, four months before the outbreak of the First Lebanon War, he passed on the Armored Corps command to Major General Moshe Bar-Kochba (Brill) and took a study leave.

Amnon Reshef retired from active military service in 1984.

=== Business career ===
After retiring from the IDF, Reshef worked as an executive vice president at Urdan Metal and Casting Industries Ltd. that was involved in the Merkava ("Chariot") tank production.

=== Author ===
In the summer of the 2013 his book "We Will Never Cease! - The 14th Brigade in the Yom Kippur War", the Story of the Bloodiest Armor Battles in History" was published. The book is the product of decades-long research that entailed deciphering recordings of radio communications during the war, air photographs, war diaries, radio transcripts, interviews with officers and conscripts, and analyzing Egyptian military literature. The book won the Stephen Moldovan Award (2013), awarded biannually by the Ariel Research Center for Defense and Communication for “the most valuable and original book contributing to Israeli security”. The book also won the prestigious Yitzhak Sadeh Prize for military literature (2014).

=== Civil activity ===
Between 1992 and 1996 Reshef served as Chairman of the Council for Peace and Security, an Israeli NGO dedicated to security-based peace with Israel's Arab neighbors.

In November 2014 Reshef wrote an open letter to Prime Minister Benjamin Netanyahu urging him to engage moderate Arab countries and launch a courageous peace initiative with the Palestinians, promising to support him if he does. Within a couple of days, over one-hundred retired IDF generals and equivalents from Mossad, Internal Security (Shabak) and police, joined Reshef in signing the letter. Once published, many more retired senior security officials urged Reshef to take the lead in launching a movement to promote the ideas encapsulated in the letter.

Reshef initiated (2014) and led Commanders for Israel's Security (CIS) comprises over 300 members - the overwhelming majority of available retired IDF generals and their equivalents in the nation's other security agencies.

The movement has been addressing the national leadership, opinion shapers, and the general public in promoting the strategic objective of a two-state solution in a regional context. Most specifically, Reshef and colleagues are out to refute baseless fear-mongering as though progress toward a settlement with the Palestinians and Israeli security are incompatible.

Based on a cumulative security experience of over 6500 years, the CIS members demonstrate the exact opposite: that security arrangements associated with separation with the Palestinians actually contributes to Israel's security whereas continuing the current path undermines national security as well as the character of Israel as the democratic home of the Jewish people.

In so doing, the movement has embraced and promotes a two phase strategy: first, as conditions are not ripe for an agreed two-state agreement, steps must be taken to keep that option open while enhancing Israelis’ security and Palestinians’ hope and daily lives. Encapsulated in Security First the plan was presented to the country's political and security leadership. It shall soon be presented to the general public.

Second, teams of CIS experts are preparing the most detailed and comprehensive plan for security arrangements in a two-state reality. This plan shall be unveiled sometime in the future.

== Field art commemoration ==
For the 40th anniversary of the Yom Kippur War (2013), the field artist Peter Weiner from Kibbutz Maoz Haim commemorated the heroic combat record of the 14th Brigade and its commander. He drew a profile of Colonel (later Major General) Amnon Reshef against a background map of Operation Stouthearted Men. Reshef's tanker helmet features the numbers of the brigade's battalions that fought in the canal crossing battle: the 79th, 184th, 87th, 407th, 424th, 582nd and Force "Shmulik." In addition, there also appear two of the brigade's organic battalions – the 52nd and 9th – that fought in other sectors. Arrows in the field drawing depict the directions of the brigade's attack and the canal crossing by the 247th Paratrooper Brigade. The drawing was made in the wheat field of Kibbutz Ein Harod (Ihud) in the Jezreel Valley. The drawing covered a 300 meter by 250 meter area, equivalent to 75 dunam (18.5 acres). Four different strains of wheat were planted, each of a different shade.
