= Operation Abirey-Halev =

Part of the Yom Kippur War (October 1973)

- Part of Yom Kippur War
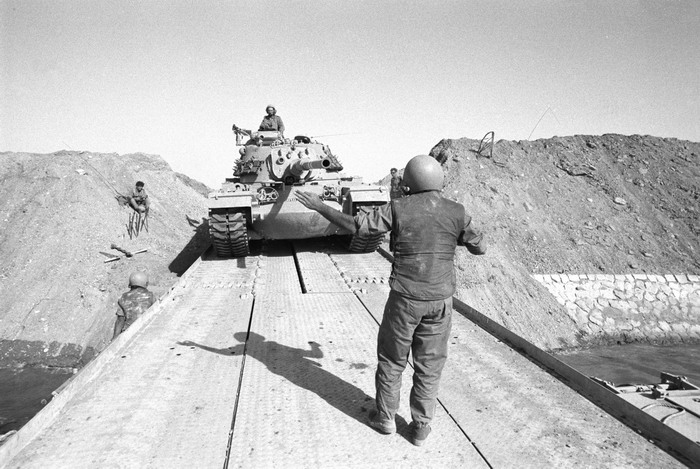
- Israeli tank crosses the Suez Canal on a bridge formed by the Combat Engineering Corps
Date	15–23 October 1973
Location	Suez Canal
Result	Israeli victory

Belligerents
Israel	Egypt

Commanders and leaders
Ariel Sharon; Amnon Reshef; Danny Matt; Haim Erez; Tuvia Raviv; Aharon Tene (Johnny); Giora Lev	N/A

Units involved
Division 143; 14th Armored Brigade; 247th paratroopers reserve Brigade; 421th armored reserve division 600th armored reserve division Combat Engineering Corps; Shayetet 11	N/A

Casualties and losses
Heavy	Heavy

Operation Abirey-Halev or Operation Abirey-Lev (lit. Knights of the Heart) also known as Operation Stouthearted Men and Operation Valiant, code-named Operation Gazelle (Hebrew: מבצע אבירי לב, Arabic: ثغرة الدفرسوار), was an Israeli operation that took place in the center of the Suez Canal on 15–23 October 1973 during the Yom Kippur War.

== Israeli breakthrough – Crossing the canal ==
After the Egyptian failed attack of October 14, the Israelis immediately followed with a multidivisional counterattack through the gap between the Egyptian 2nd and 3rd Armies. Ariel Sharon's 143rd Division, now reinforced with the 247th paratroopers reserve Brigade commanded by Colonel Danny Matt, was tasked with establishing bridgeheads on the east and west banks of the canal. The 162nd and 252nd Armored Divisions, commanded by Generals Avraham Adan and Kalman Magen respectively, would then cross through the breach to the west bank of the canal and swing southward, encircling the 3rd Army. The offensive was code-named Operation Stouthearted Men or alternatively, Operation Valiant. On the night of October 15, 750 of Colonel Matt's paratroopers crossed the canal in rubber dinghies. They were soon joined by tanks ferried on motorized rafts and additional infantry. The force encountered no resistance initially and fanned out in raiding parties, attacking supply convoys, SAM sites, logistic centers and anything of military value, with priority given to the SAMs. Attacks on SAM sites punched a hole in the Egyptian anti-aircraft screen and enabled the Israeli Air Force to strike Egyptian ground targets more aggressively.

On the night of October 15, 20 Israeli tanks and 7 APCs under the command of Colonel Haim Erez crossed the canal and penetrated 12 kilometres into mainland Egypt, taking the Egyptians by surprise. For the first 24 hours, Erez's force attacked SAM sites and military columns with impunity. On the morning of October 17, it was attacked by the 23rd Egyptian Armored Brigade, but managed to repulse the attack. By this time, the Syrians no longer posed a credible threat and the Israelis were able to shift their air power to the south in support of the offensive. The combination of a weakened Egyptian SAM umbrella and a greater concentration of Israeli fighter-bombers meant that the IAF was capable of greatly increasing sorties against Egyptian military targets, including convoys, armor and airfields. The Egyptian bridges across the canal were damaged in Israeli air and artillery attacks.

Israeli jets began attacking Egyptian SAM sites and radars, prompting General Ismail to withdraw much of the Egyptians' air defense equipment. This in turn gave the IAF still greater freedom to operate in Egyptian airspace. Israeli jets also attacked and destroyed underground communication cables at Banha in the Nile Delta, forcing the Egyptians to transmit selective messages by radio, which could be intercepted. Aside from the cables at Banha, Israel refrained from attacking economic and strategic infrastructure following an Egyptian threat to retaliate against Israeli cities with Scud missiles. Israeli aircraft bombed Egyptian Scud batteries at Port Said several times. The Egyptian Air Force attempted to interdict IAF sorties and attack Israeli ground forces, but suffered heavy losses in dogfights and from Israeli air defenses, while inflicting light aircraft losses on the Israelis. The heaviest air battles took place over the northern Nile Delta, where the Israelis repeatedly attempted to destroy Egyptian airbases.

== Securing the bridgehead ==
Despite the success the Israelis were having on the west bank, Generals Bar-Lev and Elazar ordered Sharon to concentrate on securing the bridgehead on the east bank. He was ordered to clear the roads leading to the canal as well as a position known as the Chinese Farm, just north of Deversoir, the Israeli crossing point. Sharon objected and requested permission to expand and breakout of the bridgehead on the west bank, arguing that such a maneuver would cause the collapse of Egyptian forces on the east bank. But the Israeli high command was insistent, believing that until the east bank was secure, forces on the west bank could be cut off. Sharon was overruled by his superiors and relented. On October 16, he dispatched Amnon Reshef's Brigade to attack the Chinese Farm. Other IDF forces attacked entrenched Egyptian forces overlooking the roads to the canal. After three days of bitter and close-quarters fighting, the Israelis succeeded in dislodging the numerically superior Egyptian forces. The Israelis lost about 300 dead, 1,000 wounded, and 56 tanks. The Egyptians suffered heavier casualties, including 118 tanks destroyed and 15 captured.

== Egyptian response to the Israeli crossing ==
The Egyptians meanwhile failed to grasp the extent and magnitude of the Israeli crossing, nor did they appreciate its intent and purpose. This was partly due to attempts by Egyptian field commanders to obfuscate reports concerning the Israeli crossing and partly due to a false assumption that the canal crossing was merely a diversion for a major IDF offensive targeting the right flank of the Second Army. Consequently, on October 16, General Shazly ordered the 21st Armored Division to attack southward and the T-62-equipped 25th Independent Armored Brigade to attack northward in a pincer action to eliminate the perceived threat to the Second Army.

The Egyptians failed to scout the area and were unaware that by now, Adan's 162nd Armored Division was in the vicinity. Moreover, the 21st and 25th failed to coordinate their attacks, allowing General Adan's Division to meet each force individually. Adan first concentrated his attack on the 21st Armored Division, destroying 50–60 Egyptian tanks and forcing the remainder to retreat. He then turned southward and ambushed the 25th Independent Armored Brigade, destroying 86 of its 96 tanks and all of its APCs while losing three tanks.

Egyptian artillery shelled the Israeli bridge over the canal on the morning of October 17, scoring several hits. The Egyptian Air Force launched repeated raids, some with up to twenty aircraft, to take out the bridge and rafts, damaging the bridge. The Egyptians had to shut down their SAM sites during these raids, allowing Israeli fighters to intercept the Egyptians. The Egyptians lost 16 planes and 7 helicopters, while the Israelis lost 6 planes. The bridge was damaged, and the Israeli Paratroop Headquarters, which was near the bridge, was also hit, wounding the commander and his deputy. During the night, the bridge was repaired, but only a trickle of Israeli forces crossed. According to Chaim Herzog, the Egyptians continued attacking the bridgehead until the cease-fire, using artillery and mortars to fire tens of thousands of shells into the area of the crossing. Egyptian aircraft attempted to bomb the bridge every day, and helicopters launched suicide missions, making attempts to drop barrels of napalm on the bridge and bridgehead. The bridges were damaged multiple times, and had to be repaired at night. The attacks caused heavy casualties, and many tanks were sunk when their rafts were hit. Egyptian commandos and frogmen with armored support launched a ground attack against the bridgehead, which was repulsed with the loss of 10 tanks. Two subsequent Egyptian counterattacks were also beaten back.

After the failure of the October 17 counterattacks, the Egyptian General Staff slowly began to realize the magnitude of the Israeli offensive. Early on October 18, the Soviets showed Sadat satellite imagery of Israeli forces operating on the west bank. Alarmed, Sadat dispatched Shazly to the front to assess the situation first hand. He no longer trusted his field commanders to provide accurate reports. Shazly confirmed that the Israelis had at least one division on the west bank and were widening their bridgehead. He advocated withdrawing most of Egypt's armor from the east bank to confront the growing Israeli threat on the west bank. Sadat rejected this recommendation outright and even threatened Shazly with a court martial. Ahmad Ismail Ali recommended that Sadat push for a cease-fire so as to prevent the Israelis from exploiting their successes.
