= List of equipment of the Egyptian Army =

Equipment of the Egyptian Army

The list of equipment of the Egyptian Army outlines the major equipment in service with the Egyptian Army.

== Individual equipment ==
Name	Image	Origin	Type	Notes
Protective gear
M-3E		Egypt	Protective mask	The Mask is used by the M60A3 tank crew to provide protection against military & biological gasses and atomic dust
M81-A		Egypt	Filtering protective suit	* Manufactured from filterating Cloth that protects against weapons of mass destruction (NBC): Protects all the body organs from the effect of weapons of mass destructions and helps the body to breathe naturally through the skin; Allows the sweat to be evaporated; Purifies the air that enters the body from all harmful contaminations
Hełm wz. 50		Polish People's Republic	Combat helmet	Standard issue for regular infantry
Hełm wz. 67		Polish People's Republic	Combat helmet	Standard issue for regular infantry
BK-3 Helmet		Croatia	Combat helmet	Standard issue for forces deployed in Sinai insurgency operations
Ops-Core FAST helmet		United States	Combat helmet	Used by Special Forces Army/Navy Command (El-Sa'ka Forces)
PASGT		United States	Combat helmet, ballistic vest	Used by Special Forces Army/Navy Command (El-Sa'ka Forces)
Mars Armor Modular Tactical Vest Model 58		People's Republic of Bulgaria	Ballistic vest	Standard issue for regular infantry
Defcon 5 BAV-13 Plate Carrier		Italy	Ballistic vest	
Egyptian Integrated Soldier System		Egypt	Future soldier program	

== Infantry weapons ==
=== Small arms ===
Name	Image	Origin	Type	Caliber	Comment
Pistols
Colt M1911		United States	Semi-automatic pistol	.45 ACP	Used by Special Forces Army/Navy Command (El-Sa'ka Forces)
Browning Hi-Power		Belgium	Semi-automatic pistol	9×19mm	Used by Special Forces Army/Navy Command (El-Sa'ka Forces)
TT-33		Soviet Union	Semi-automatic pistol	7.62×25mm	Used by Special Forces Army/Navy Command (El-Sa'ka Forces)
Glock 17		Austria	Semi-automatic pistol	9×19mm	Used by Special Forces Army/Navy Command (El-Sa'ka Forces)
SIG Sauer P226		Switzerland	Semi-automatic pistol	9×19mm	Used by Special Forces Army/Navy Command (El-Sa'ka Forces)
H&K USP		Germany	Semi-automatic pistol	9×19mm	Used by Special Forces Army/Navy Command (El-Sa'ka Forces)
Helwan 920		Italy; Egypt	Semi-automatic pistol	9×19mm	Beretta 92FS pistol, with early Beretta 92-style grip-mounted magazine release button. Produced under license by the Ministry of Military Production, Factory 54 Service Pistol
CZ 75		Czechoslovak Socialist Republic	Semi-automatic pistol	9×19mm	Secondary Service Pistol
RS9 Vampir		Bosnia and Herzegovina	Semi-automatic pistol	9×19mm	Secondary Service Pistol
Submachine gun
HK MP5		West Germany	Submachine gun	9×19mm	Used by Paratroopers, Special Forces Army/Navy Command (El-Sa'ka Forces)
UMP		Germany	Submachine gun	.45 ACP	Used by Special Forces Army/Navy Command (El-Sa'ka Forces)
Star Model Z-45		Spain	Submachine gun	9×23mm	
CZ Scorpion Evo 3		Czech Republic	Submachine gun	9×19mm / 9×21mm	Used by Special Forces Army/Navy Command (El-Sa'ka Forces)
Škorpion		Czechoslovak Socialist Republic	Submachine gun	.32 ACP	Used by Special Forces Army/Navy Command (El-Sa'ka Forces)
MP7		Germany	Submachine gun	4.6×30mm	Used by Paratroopers, Special Forces Army/Navy Command (El-Sa'ka Forces)
PP-19 Vityaz		Russia	Submachine gun	9×19mm	
Shotgun
Saiga-12		Russia	Shotgun	12-gauge	Used by Infantry units and Special Forces Army/Navy Command (El-Sa'ka Forces)
M1014		Italy	Combat shotgun	12-gauge	
M590		United States	Shotgun	12-gauge	
Assault rifle/Carbine
SIG 552		Switzerland	Carbine	5.56×45mm	Used by Special Forces Army/Navy Command (El-Sa'ka Forces) and Paratroopers 170th Airborne Brigade
Heckler & Koch G36		Germany	Assault rifle	5.56×45mm	Used by Special Forces Army/Navy Command (El-Sa'ka Forces)
Beretta AR70/90		Italy	Assault rifle	5.56×45mm	
SKS		Soviet Union	Semi-automatic rifle	7.62×39mm	Used By Infantry Units
Misr assault rifle		Soviet Union; Egypt	Assault rifle	7.62×39mm	Indigenous version of the Soviet AKM rifle. Produced under license by the Al Maadi Company for Engineering Industries (Factory 54). Main Service Rifle
SIG Sauer SIGM400		United States	Semi-automatic rifle	5.56×45mm NATO	Used by Infantry units and Special Forces Army/Navy Command (El-Sa'ka Forces)
AK-74		Soviet Union	Assault rifle	5.45×39mm	Used by Infantry units and Special Forces Army/Navy Command (El-Sa'ka Forces)
AK-12		Russia	Assault rifle	5.45×39mm	Used by Infantry units and Special Forces Army/Navy Command (El-Sa'ka Forces)
AK-15		Russia	Assault rifle	7.62×39mm	Used by Infantry units and Special Forces Army/Navy Command (El-Sa'ka Forces)
AK-101		Russia	Assault rifle	5.56×45mm	Used By Infantry Units
AK-103		Russia	Assault rifle	7.62×39mm	Used by Infantry units and Special Forces Army/Navy Command (El-Sa'ka Forces)
AK-104		Russia	Assault rifle	7.62×39mm	Used by Infantry units and Special Forces Army/Navy Command (El-Sa'ka Forces)
PM md. 63		Socialist Republic of Romania	Assault rifle	7.62×39mm	Used by Infantry units and Special Forces Army/Navy Command (El-Sa'ka Forces) and police forces
Zastava M70		Yugoslavia	Assault rifle	7.62×39mm	Used by Infantry units and Special Forces Army/Navy Command (El-Sa'ka Forces)
Zastava M21		Serbia and Montenegro Serbia	Assault rifle	5.56×45mm	Used by Infantry units and Special Forces Army/Navy Command (El-Sa'ka Forces)
AR-M1		Bulgaria	Assault rifle	7.62×39mm	Used by Infantry units and Special Forces Army/Navy Command (El-Sa'ka Forces)
M16		United States	Assault rifle	5.56×45mm	
M4A1		United States	Carbine	5.56×45mm	Used by Paratroopers and Special Forces Army/Navy Command (El-Sa'ka Forces)
CAR-15		United States	Assault rifle Carbine	5.56×45mm	Used by Paratroopers and Special Forces Army/Navy Command (El-Sa'ka Forces)
SIG Sauer SIG516		United States; Germany	Assault rifle	5.56×45mm	Used by Rapid Deployment Forces and Special Forces Army/Navy Command (El-Sa'ka Forces)
Vz. 52		Czechoslovak Socialist Republic	Semi-automatic rifle	7.62×45mm	Used by Paratroopers, Republican Guard and Special Forces Army/Navy Command (El-Sa'ka Forces)
CZ-805 BREN A1/A2		Czech Republic	Assault rifle	5.56×45mm	Used by Paratroopers, Republican Guard and Special Forces Army/Navy Command (El-Sa'ka Forces) (candidate for replacement service rifle)
CZ 807		Czech Republic	Assault rifle	7.62×39mm	Used by Paratroopers, Republican Guard and Special Forces Army/Navy Command (El-Sa'ka Forces) (candidate for replacement service rifle)
Beretta ARX 160		Italy	Assault rifle	5.56×45mm	Used by Special Forces Army/Navy Command (El-Sa'ka Forces)
Machine gun
Zastava M72		Yugoslavia	Light machine gun	7.62×39mm	
RPD		Soviet Union; Egypt	Light machine gun	7.62×39mm	Produced locally under license. (See RPD page)
FN Minimi		Belgium; Egypt	Light machine gun	5.56×45mm	Produced locally under license.
RPK		Soviet Union	Light machine gun	7.62×39mm	
PKM		Soviet Union	General-purpose machine gun	7.62×54mmR	PK PKM PKMS
M60		United States	General-purpose machine gun	7.62×51mm	Also known as Mk43
FN MAG		Belgium; Egypt	General-purpose machine gun	7.62×51mm	Produced locally under license (See FN MAG page)
DP-27		Soviet Union	Light machine gun	7.62×54mmR	
SG-43 Goryunov		Soviet Union; Egypt	Medium machine gun	7.62×54mmR	Produced locally
DShK		Soviet Union	Heavy machine gun	12.7×108mm	
NSV		Soviet Union	Heavy machine gun	12.7×108mm	Used by T-80 crews
M2HB		United States	Heavy machine gun	.50 BMG	
KPV		USSR	Heavy machine gun	14.5×114mm	See KPV page
Sniper rifle
Mosin-Nagant		Russian Empire	Bolt-action; Sniper rifle	7.62×54mmR	
Dragunov SVD		Soviet Union	Designated marksman rifle Sniper rifle	7.62×54mmR	
Accuracy International AWM		United Kingdom	Sniper rifle	.300 Winchester Magnum	Used by Rapid Deployment Forces
PSG1		West Germany	Sniper rifle	7.62×51mm	
M40A3		United States	Sniper rifle	7.62×51mm	
M24		United States	Sniper rifle	7.62×51mm	
SIG Sauer SSG 3000		Switzerland	Sniper rifle	7.62×51mm	Used by Unit 777
Barrett M82		United States	Anti-materiel rifle	.50 caliber	Used by Thunderbolt Forces, Unit 999, Egyptian navy special forces brigades and Black Cobra Unit
PGM Hécate II		France	Anti-materiel rifle	.50 caliber	Used By Rapid Deployment Forces and Black Cobra
OSV-96		Russia	Anti-materiel sniper rifle	12.7×108mm	Used by Egyptian special operation forces.
M110 SASS		United States	Sniper rifle	7.62×51mm	Used By Unit 777 and Thunderbolt Forces.
Orsis T-5000		Russia	Sniper rifle	6.5×47mm Lapua or 7.62×51mm NATO (.308 Winchester) or .300 Winchester Magnum or .338 Lapua Magnum or .375 CheyTac	Used By Unit 777 and Thunderbolt Forces.
Riyad sniper rifle		Egypt	Sniper rifle	7.62×54mm	Manufactured locally
Grenade launcher
MK19		United States; Egypt	Automatic grenade launcher	40×53mm	Manufactured locally.
Maadi GL		United States; Egypt	Underbarrel grenade launcher	40×46mm	Manufactured locally
M79		United States	Single shot grenade launcher	40×46mm	

=== Anti-tank and missile ===
==== Recoilless rifles ====
Name	Image	Origin	Comment
Recoilless rifle
M40		United States	105 mm
SPG-9		USSR	73 mm
B-10		USSR	82 mm
Carl Gustaf 8.4 cm recoilless rifle		Sweden	84 mm
AT4		Sweden	84 mm
SAKR 105		Egypt	105mm

==== Anti-tank systems ====
Name	Image	Origin	Number	Comment
Anti tank systems
RPG-7		Soviet Union; Egypt		Made by the Sakr Factory for Development Industries.
RPG-32		Russia	Unknown	
M72 LAW		United States		
MILAN II		France	345 units	Wire-guided anti-armor missile system
Swingfire		United Kingdom; Egypt	260+ units	Wire-guided anti-armor missile system (locally made)
BGM-71D TOW II		United States; Egypt	500+ 450 missiles	Wire-guided anti-armor missile system (810 + 575 units(locally made)
AGM-114 Hellfire		United States	Unknown	107 mm
9M14 Malyutka		Soviet Union; Egypt	Unknown	Wire-guided anti-tank guided missile system.
9M113 Konkurs		Soviet Union	Unknown	Wire-guided anti-tank missile, mounted on Fahd armoured personnel carriers purchased in the 1990s
9K115-2 Metis-M		Russia	Unknown	Anti-tank missile, mounted on armoured personnel carriers purchased in 2014
Skif (anti-tank guided missile)		Ukraine	Unknown	Anti-tank missile
Akeron MP		France	Appears in Navy Thunderbolts Training on 15 March 2023	Anti-tank missile
AT-1K Raybolt		South Korea	Unknown	Bought along with K9 howitzers in 2022, locally produced under licence
HJ-8		China; Egypt	Unknown	Locally Produced Version Named AHRAM
HJ-73		China	Unknown	
FGM-148 Javelin		United States	FGM-148F	Approved for purchase of up to 2,020 FGM-148F missiles and 200 Lightweight Command Launch Units (LWCLUs) in October 2026 for $832 million.

==== Man-portable air defence ====
System	Image	Origin	Comment
Sakr Eye		Egypt	Egyptian modified version of the SA-7 man-portable air-defense system short range surface-to-air missile. Made by the Sakr Factory for Development Industries.
9K34 Strela-3		Soviet Union	Man-portable air-defense system short range surface-to-air missile.
FIM-92 Stinger		United States	Man-portable air-defense system short range surface-to-air missile
9K38 Igla		Soviet Union	Man-portable air-defense system short range surface-to-air missile. 9K38 / 9K338 variants

=== Mortars ===
System	Image	Origin	Number	Comment
Mortars
M240		Soviet Union		240 mm
M1943		Soviet Union	1800	160 mm
M-43		Soviet Union		120 mm
2B11 Sani		Soviet Union		120 mm
Helwan UK-2		Soviet Union		120 mm, Egyptian version of the M-43
M2		United States; Egypt		107 mm
M224 Mortar		United States		60 mm mortar system
Helwan		China		60 mm, Egyptian modified variant of the Chinese Type 63-1

==== Training mortars ====
System	Image	Origin	Comment
Training mortars
M1938		Soviet Union	120 mm
2B14 Podnos		Soviet Union	82 mm

== Vehicles ==
=== Main battle tanks ===
Main battle tanks (4,034)
Model	Image	Origin	In service	Notes
M1A1 Abrams		United States; Egypt	1,300	555 units will be up-graded to M1A1 SA std.
M60A3		United States	1700	
T-62		Soviet Union	500	
T-54/T-55		Soviet Union	500	
Ramses II tank		Soviet Union	260	
T-80		Soviet Union	34	14 T-80UK and 20 T-80U were reportedly purchased in 1997.
Reconnaissance vehicles (412)
Commando Scout		United States	112	
BRDM-2		Soviet Union	300	
Infantry fighting vehicles (1500)
YPR-765		Netherlands	1200	25mm cannon
BMP-1		Soviet Union	300	

=== Armoured vehicles ===
Model	Image	Origin	Type	Version	Number	Details
Armoured personnel carriers (tracked)
M113/YPR-765		United States; Egypt	Armored personnel carrier Tank destroyer Tracked field command vehicle Tracked support and cargo vehicle Artillery fire support vehicle	M113A2; M901A3; M577; M548; M981 FISTV	2,700	Purchased between 1980 and 2002, the APC version was upgraded by Egypt and equipment with a protective shield for its 12.7mm main weapon station.
BTR-50		USSR; Egypt	Amphibious armored personnel carrier	BTR-50PKM BTR-50PK	500	500 were ordered in 1964 from the Soviet Union and delivered between 1965 and 1966. 250 BTR-50s are currently in service, and were upgraded by 2014 to BTR-50PKM standard by Minotor of Belurus with new engines, transmissions and night vision equipment. A similar upgrade is to be performed on 200 OT-62s. These are likely to remain in service for many years.
OT-62 TOPAS		Czechoslovakia Ukraine	Amphibious armored personnel carrier	OT-62B; OT-62	200	Purchased in 1972. 200 units were upgraded by Ukraine to the OT-62B standard in 2010.
Armoured personnel carriers (wheeled)
BMR-600		Spain	Armoured personnel carrier	BMR-600P	250	
Fahd		Egypt; West Germany	Armored personnel carrier Armored medevac Tank destroyer Armored command post Infantry fighting vehicle	Fahd 240; Fahd 280; Fahd 280–30	410	Developed in partnership with West German firm Thyssen-Henschel, with production starting 1986 and ending in 2010. 800 vehicles were produced, including a single infantry fighting vehicle which was rejected by the Egyptian Army due to its height (a drawback in a flat, open terrain like a desert). The tank destroyer variant is equipped with MILAN AT missiles.
BTR-60		Soviet Union	Amphibious armored personnel carrier	BTR-60PB	250	Originally as small number was bought in June 1967 for evaluation, with a subsequent order for 650 units placed in 1969 and delivered between 1970 and 1973. A number of machines were lost during the Yom Kippur War, and with time others were retired, so that only 200 units are still in operation today.
Walid		Egypt	Armored personnel carrier	Walid MKII	650	Production started in 1966 and of the units are assigned to border patrol.
Protected patrol vehicle
Caiman		United States	MRAP	CAT II (6x6)	535	In May 2016, Egypt received its first shipment of a total of 762 MRAP vehicles from the United States, which arrived in the port of Alexandria for delivery to the Egyptian military.
Reva		South Africa	MRAP	REVA III REVA V LWB	N/A	
RG-33		South Africa; United Kingdom United States	MRAP	Total; RG-33L; HAGA	449	The heavily armored vehicle is designed to protect soldiers from blasts from IEDs, landmines, and from other types of attacks.
ST-500		Egypt			N/A	Designed and manufactured by Egypt
Temsah armoured personnel carrier (Egypt)		Egypt	MRAPs, Light tactical APCs	Temsah 2 Temsah 3	N/A	Fully designed and produced in domestic military factories. Its maximum capacity is 2 crew and 6 passengers. The vehicle has a BR7 armour protection level which offers all-round protection against 7.62mm rounds as well as grenades and certain types of explosives. It is armed with an externally mounted 7.62mm machine gun and a 40-mm grenade launcher. Other versions can be used for electronic and wireless jamming purposes. Timsah II : 6x6 Timsah III : 4x4 Squad Car
Armoured utility vehicles
Panthera T6		Egypt; United Arab Emirates	Armored personnel carrier	Panthera T6	N/A	Produced locally by Egyptian company Eagles Defence International Systems (EDIS).
Panthera F9		United Arab Emirates	Armored personnel carrier	Panthera F9		
Sherpa		France	Armored personnel carrier		173	
ST-100		Egypt	MRAP		N/A	First introduced in EDEX 2018
Anti-tank vehicles
M901		United States	Anti-tank missile carrier		52	
YPR-765		Netherlands United States	Anti-tank missile carrier		300	
HMMWV		United States	Anti-tank missile carrier		N/A	Equipped with TOW-2
DMS-K		Egypt	Anti-tank missile carrier		N/A	Equipped with Konkurs-M. Unveiled at EDEX 2023, tailored for special forces and mechanized troops.

== Artillery ==
Model	Image	Origin	Type	Version	Number	Period	Details
Multiple-rocket launcher (358)
Type 63 multiple rocket launcher		China Egypt	107mm MLRS	RL812/TLC	22		RL812/TLC is a locally license variant mounted on vehicles. There is also a single-tube, man-portable rocket launcher variant that fire the same type of rockets called PRL-81.
ATS-59		Soviet Union	122mm MLRS	ATS-59G	18		
BM-21		USSR; Egypt	MLRS 122 mm	BM-21; BM-11; Sakr-10; Sakr-18; Sakr-36	256		*Range 36 km *Range 30 km *Range 20 km *Range 20 km *Range 10 km *Range 10 km *Range 10 km Egypt purchased the original 215 units from the Soviet Union and a domestic production license renaming all the future machines Sakr. Sark-4 are tripod-based units, while Sakr-10 and Sakr-8 are jeep-mounted units, and the rest are truck-mounted units. Egypt also developed a wheeled based MRL called Sakr-45.
RAAD 200		Egypt	122mm MLRS		Planned		
K-136 Kooryong		South Korea	130mm MLRS		36		
M270		United States	MLRS 227 mm	M270	26		Range dependent on the type of ammunition used: *Range with M26 rocket 32 km *Range with M26A1/A2 rocket 45 km *Range with M30 rocket 70 km
Self-propelled artillery (513)
SP-122		USSR; Russia; Egypt	Self-propelled howitzer 122 mm		38		Locally assembled D-30 gun on an Armored Ural Truck chassis License built by Egypt. Some are modernized
M-46		Soviet Union	130mm Self-propelled howitzer		100		Locally Assembled M-46 gun on an Armored KrAZ Truck chassis Modernized
M109		United States; Egypt	Self-propelled howitzer 155 mm & 122mm	M109A5; M102A2	325		
M110			Self-propelled howitzer 203 mm	M110A2	50		The Egyptian Army received 144 as M110A2 as aid in 1996.
K9 Thunder		Republic of Korea; Egypt	155 mm self-propelled howitzer	K9A1EGY	216 (planned)		The export contract worth $1.6 billion was signed in February 2022. Initial batches will be produced in South Korea while the rest will be produced in Egypt under license from 2024 with 50% localization rate.
Towed artillery (558)
D-30		USSR; Egypt	122 mm howitzer	D-30M	100		Egypt bought production license and will likely use it to replace completely the older 122 mm models that are now stored due to age.
M-30		USSR	122 mm howitzer		122		Some used for training the rest are stored.
M-46		USSR; China; Egypt	130 mm howitzer	M-46; Type 59-1M	320	1952–	Egypt bought the license to produce M-46 from USSR.
GH 52		Finland; Egypt	155 mm howitzer		16		Being manufactured locally under license, likely to replace aging 122 mm and 130 mm artillery.
Self-propelled mortar
M106		United States	65 mm mortar carrier	M106A2	35		
M125		United States; Netherlands	81 mm mortar carrier	M125A2	50		
M1064		United States	120 mm mortar carrier	M1064A3	36		
M-160		Soviet Union	160 mm self-propelled mortar		30		
Ammunition support vehicle
K10		Republic of Korea; Egypt	Artillery ammunition support vehicle	K10; K11	39 K10 and 51 K11 (planned)		Ammunition resupply vehicle to support the K9s.
M992		United States	Artillery ammunition support vehicle		250		Designed to support self-propelled howitzers, purchased from US along with the M109A5s.

== Engineering, logistic and utility vehicles ==
=== Engineering vehicles ===
Model	Image	Origin	Type	Number	Details
M88		United States; Egypt	Armoured recovery vehicle	310	In 1992 Egypt bought 221 M88A1 recovery vehicles for its M1A1 tanks, then in 1997 Egypt bought further 24 M88A2 but also obtaining the right for domestic manufacture. 50 M88A2 units were produced in the first batch, with further 13 produced in the second batch in 2002.
YPR-765-PRBRG		Netherlands	Armoured recovery vehicle		Bought along with the YPR-765 IFV
M579		United States	Armoured recovery vehicle	N/A	
BREM-2		USSR	Armoured recovery vehicle		
M578		United States	Armoured recovery vehicle		
BTS-4A		USSR	Armoured recovery vehicle	N/A	
Maxxpro		United States	Armoured recovery vehicle	12	
M984		United States	Recovery vehicle		
M728 CEV		United States	Combat engineer vehicle		Bought from the old U.S. Army Europe stock in the 1990s.
BAT-2		USSR	Combat engineer vehicle	72	
M104 Wolverine		United States	Armoured vehicle-launched bridge		Bought as an option along with the Abrams tank.
M60A1 AVLB		United States	Armoured vehicle-launched bridge		Bought along with other M60 tanks.
MT-55 K/L		USSR	Armoured vehicle-launched bridge		
MTU-20		USSR	Armoured vehicle-launched bridge	56	
TMM-3		USSR	Motorized bridge	96	Based on the KrAZ-255 it was the standard motorized bridge of USSR in the 70s that Egypt bought in the same decade. It is believed that all units are still combat capable.
TMM-1		USSR	Motorized bridge	70	Based on the ZIL-157 it was the standard motorized bridge of USSR in the 60s that Egypt bought in the same decade, but today its serviceability is highly doubtful due to its age.
TPP		USSR	Mobile treadway bridge	94	Based on the ZIL-151 it was the standard treadway system of USSR in the 50s that Egypt bought in the 60s, but today its serviceability is highly doubtful due to its age.
PMP		USSR	Floating bridge		Uses KrAZ-255 for transportation.
GSP-55		USSR	Amphibious tracked ferry	86	
PMM-2		Ukraine	Pontoon bridger	56	Bought from Ukraine after the collapse of the Soviet Union.
BMK-T		USSR	Bridging boats		
BMK-150M		USSR	Bridging boats		
BMK-130M		USSR	Bridging boats		
Fahd		Egypt	Minelayer	75	
Nather-1/2		USSR	Minelayer		A Soviet UMZ system that could be carried by any 6×4 truck, its successor in the Soviet Union became the GMZ.
Husky VMMD (Husky 2G)		United States	Mine clearer		
Fateh 2/3/4		USSR; Egypt	Mine clearer	340	Based on a Soviet T-55 chassis with two mine-clearing line charges.
Armtrac 400		United Kingdom	Mine clearer		
PZM-2		Ukraine	Trencher	48	Bought from Ukraine after the collapse of the Soviet Union.
MDK-2M		USSR	Trencher	36	
Komatsu D275A-5R		Japan			
M9 ACE		United States			
Caterpillar D9		United States			
Caterpillar D7		United States			
Dumper Caterpillar 740B		United States			
Caterpillar 930G		United States	Front end loader		
Bronto Skylift S 104 HLA		Finland			

- PZM-2 Ditcher (36)

==== Amphibious bridging ====
- BMK-T Bridging Boats (48)
- BMK-130M Bridging Boats (48)
- BMK-150M Bridging Boats (48)

=== Utility vehicles ===
Name	Image	Origin	Type	Variant	Number	Details
M274		United States	All-terrain vehicle			
Sand-X T-ATV 1200		Germany	All-terrain vehicle			
Polaris Ranger 4x4		United States	Utility vehicle			
Polaris Ranger 6x6		United States	Utility vehicle			
HMMWV		United States; Egypt	Utility vehicle	M998; M1038; M1043; M996; M1043	675; 450; 510+575; 150; 140	Utility and cargo carrier Utility and cargo carrier Utility and cargo carrier; additional 575 M1043 are on order. Mini ambulance Maxi ambulance * Arab Organization for Industrialization has a project of fitting HMMWVs with anti armor weaponry, options include: TOW, Milan, or HOT missiles.
G-Class		Germany; Egypt	Utility vehicle		3,910+	Production ongoing by Kader Factory for Developed Industries as the Kader-320.
Jeep CJ		United States; Egypt	Utility vehicle	Jeep CJ7; Jeep CJ8; Jeep TJ; Jeep JK; Jeep J8	10,650	Locally built.
M151		United States	Utility vehicle			

=== Logistic vehicles ===
Name	Image	Origin	Type	Variant	Number	Details
HETS		United States	Heavy tractor	Total; M1070; M1070A1	295; 249; 46	The first 170 vehicles were delivered by December 2004. By late 2009 around 249 systems had been ordered. In July 2016, Egypt made a new order for 46 M1070A1 HET A1 heavy tractors.
MAZ		USSR	Very heavy truck (19,600 kg)	MAZ-543		
HEMTT A4		United States	Fuel servicing truck Recovery truck	M978; M978A4; M984A4	75; 1; 1	
Ural		Russia	Very heavy truck (12,000 kg)	Ural-5323		
ZiL		USSR	Very heavy truck (10,000 kg)	ZIL-135		
M939		United States	Heavy truck (5,000 kg)	Model M931; Model M927; Model M923; Model M818		
M54		United States	Heavy truck (5,000 kg)			US army surplus.
KrAZ		Ukraine USSR	Heavy truck (10,000 kg) Heavy Truck (7,500 kg)	KrAZ-6322 KrAZ-255		
Scania		Sweden	Heavy truck (6,000 kg)	Model SBA111		Ordered during the late 1980s.
Ural		USSR; Egypt USSR	Heavy truck (5,000 kg) Heavy truck (4,500 kg)	Ural-4320 Ural-375D		Locally built, ongoing production
ZiL		USSR	Heavy truck (3,500 kg)	ZIL-131		Ordered in the 1960s from the Soviet Union.
M35		United States	Medium truck (2,500 kg)			US army surplus
GAZ		USSR	Medium truck (2,000 kg)	GAZ-66		
Trucks
635NL trailer		United States	Flatbed			Produced under license.
M 970A1		United States	Refueler			

== Missile and air defence systems ==
=== Surface-to-surface missile ===
Name	Image	Origin	Type	Quantity	Notes
Sakr-80		Egypt; Soviet Union	artillery rocket system	24	indigenous Luna-M upgrade
9K52 Luna-M		Soviet Union	Short-range ballistic missile	9	
Scud missile		Soviet Union	Short-range ballistic missile		Scud-B, Scud-C

=== Air Defense ===
Name	Image	Origin	Type	Variant	Quantity	Notes
S-300		Russia	Long Range Air Defense	S-300VM (SA-23)	4 Battalions	Preparation to receive the S-300VM were under way in November 2014 First components delivered in March 2015. AA Range = 200 km, AA Ceiling = 30 km, Speed = Mach 5, ABM Range = 40 km.
HQ9-B		China	Long Range Air Defense	HQ9-B	4 Batteries	
IRIS-T SLM, SLX, SLS		Germany	Medium Range Air Defense	IRIS-T SLM, SLX, SLS	7 SLM Systems, 10 SLX systems, 6 SLS systems for a total of 23 batteries	The German government approved the sale of 7 IRIS-T SLM tactical medium range AD systems to Egypt in September 2018.
NASAMS	NASAMS-Medium Range Air Defence	United States	Medium Range Air Defense	NASAMS 3	4 Batteries	
Volga		Soviet Union	Medium Range Air Defense	Tayer el-Sabah; SA-2	100	100 units were delivered by USSR from 1970 to 1972 for use in the Yom Kippur War. The Egyptians were impressed by the system's performance and acquired a local production license from the USSR. AA Range = 45 km, AA Ceiling = 25 km, Speed = Mach 3.5, ABM = none
Buk		Soviet Union	Medium Range Air Defense	M1-2; M2 (SA-17)		The Buk-M2 was not previously known to be in Egyptian service until it was revealed in a video of an air defence exercise released on 2 November 2014 by the MoD. AA Range = 30 km, AA Ceiling = 14 km, Speed = Mach 3.0
MIM-23 Hawk		United States	Medium Range Air Defense	Phase III	62	On 25 February 2014, Egypt ordered new 186 rocket motors to extend the life of their Hawk batteries. Since there are 3 missiles per launch unit then one can deduce that Egypt plans to maintain 62 launcher systems. AA Range = 50 km, AA Ceiling = 14 km, Speed = Mach 2.4
Pechora 2M		Soviet Union	Medium Range Air Defense	2M (SA-3)	70	Originally Egypt received 200 units from USSR between 1970 and 1972 and they were used extensively during the Yom Kippur War. These units aged and some of them were upgraded to Pechora-2M version. As of December 2008, 70 Pechora-2M upgraded ramp-launched missiles had been ordered by Egypt. AA Range = 35 km, AA Ceiling = 18 km, Speed = Mach 3.1
Kub		Soviet Union	Medium Range Air Defense	SA-6	56	Purchased from the Soviet Union after the disastrous 6 Day War and was used to great effect in the Yom Kippur War virtually denying the entire air space of Egypt to Israel. The system was modernized and is still in service. AA Range = 24 km, AA Ceiling = 14 km, Speed = Mach 2.8
Tor		Soviet Union	Short Range Air Defense	M1; M2 (SA-15)	16	16 units were purchased from Russia. The Tor-M2 was not previously known to be in Egyptian service until it was revealed in a video of an air defence exercise released on 2 November 2014 by the MoD. AA Range = 12 km, AA Ceiling = 6 km, Speed = Mach 2.5
AN/TWQ-1 Avenger		United States	Short Range Air Defense		75	Egypt originally ordered 50 units, but in 2006 it chose to order a further 25 units which all were delivered by September 2008. AA Range = 8 km, AA Ceiling = 8 km, Speed = Mach 2.2
Crotale		France	Short Range Air Defense	VT-1	36	Purchased from France in 1980. AA Range = 11 km, AA Ceiling = 6 km, Speed = 3.53
MIM-72 Chaparral		United States	Short Range Air Defense	MIM-72C	280	Purchased from U.S. stock in 1987,2014; AA Range = 9 km, AA Ceiling = 4 km, Speed = Mach 1.5
Strela-1		Soviet Union	Short Range Air Defense	SA-9	20	AA Range = 4.2 km, AA Ceiling = 3.5 km, Speed = Mach 1.8
M113 AA		United States	SPAAG	Nile 23; Sinai 23; M163 VADS		Upgraded version of the ZU-23-2 twin 23 mm self-propelled anti-aircraft guns radar guided (148) with Sakr Eye SAM 2X2 on M113, Upgraded version of the ZU-23-2 twin 23 mm self-propelled anti-aircraft guns radar guided with Stinger SAM (3X2) (72) on M113, 108
Shilka		Soviet Union	SPAAG			350 in 1995. 330 were delivered from USSR, also a new contract was signed with Russia in 2005.
ZSU-57-2		Soviet Union	SPAAG		40	100 ordered in 1960 from Soviet Union and delivered between 1961 and 1962, with 40 remaining in storage today.
M53/59 Praga		Czechoslovakia	SPAAG			
Skyguard Amoun		Switzerland	Towed AA/SHORAD (35 mm)	Amoun	36	72 GDF units used with one Skyguard unit and two Sparrow SAM launchers per battery
M167 VADS		United States	Towed AA (20 mm)		72	
ZPU		Soviet Union	Towed AA (14.5 mm)		200	
ZU-23-2		Soviet Union	Towed AA (23 mm)		280	280 as Nile 23 and Sinai 23, and 650 upgraded with radar guidance
61-K		Soviet Union	Towed AA (37 mm)		200	700
S-60		Soviet Union	Towed AA (57 mm)		200	600
52-K		Soviet Union	Towed AA (85 mm)			400
KS-19		Soviet Union	Towed AA (100 mm)			200
KS-30		Soviet Union	Towed AA (130 mm)			120

== Other equipment ==
- BK-3 Helmet
- Czechoslovak M53 helmet
- OR-201
- SSh-68
- Airman Battle Uniform
- Desert Camouflage Uniform
- Desert Battle Dress Uniform
- MultiCam
- OG-107
- U.S. Woodland
- Lizard (camouflage)
- Ratnik (program)

== Bibliography ==
- International Institute for Strategic Studies (February 2016). The Military Balance 2016. Vol. 116. Routlegde. ISBN 9781857438352.
- IISS (2017). "The Military Balance 2017". The Military Balance: Annual Estimates of the Nature and Size of the Military Forces of the Principal Powers. Routledge. ISSN 0459-7222.
- International Institute for Strategic Studies (12 February 2025). The Military Balance 2025. London: Routledge. ISBN 9781003630760.
