= List of equipment of the Nicaraguan Armed Forces =

This is a list of the equipment used by the Nicaraguan Armed Forces.

== Army ==
=== Armoured fighting vehicles ===
Model	Image	Origin	Quantity	Details
MBT
T-72B1MS		Russia	20+	
T-55		USSR	31	(96 T-55 in store).
LT TK
PT-76		USSR	0	(10 PT-76 in store).
RECCE
BRDM-2M		Russia	20	
BRDM-2		USSR	20	
IFV
BMP-1		USSR	17+	
APC (T)
BTR-50		USSR	some	
APC (W)
BTR-70M		Russia	ε40	
BTR-60		USSR	45	(15 more in store).
BTR-152		USSR	41	(61 more in store).

=== Engineering & maintenance vehicles ===
Model	Image	Origin	Quantity	Details
AEV
IMR		USSR	7+	
IRM		USSR	7	
VLB
TMM-3		USSR	n/a	

=== Anti-tank/anti-infrastructure ===
Model	Image	Origin	Caliber	Quantity	Notes
MSL • SP
9P133 Malyutka		USSR	125mm	12	
MSL • MANPATS
9K11 Malyutka		USSR	125mm	n/a	
RCL
B-10		USSR	82mm	n/a	
GUNS
BS-3		USSR	100mm	24	
ZIS-3		USSR	76mm	83	
ZIS-2		USSR	57mm	n/a	

=== Artillery ===
Model	Image	Origin	Caliber	Quantity	Notes
MRL
BM-21 Grad		USSR	122mm	18	
Grad 1P		USSR	122mm	100	(BM-21P) (single-tube rocket launcher, man portable).
Type-63		China	107mm	33	
TOWED
D-20		USSR	152mm	6	(24 D-20 in store).
D-30		USSR	122mm	12	
MOR
M-160		USSR	160mm	0	(4 M-160 in store).
M-43		USSR	120mm	24	
n/a		n/a	82mm	n/a	

=== Air defense ===
Model	Image	Origin	Quantity	Notes
SAM • Point-defence
9K310 Igla-1		USSR	n/a	
9K36 Strela-3		USSR	n/a	
9K32 Strela-2		USSR	n/a	
GUNS • TOWED
ZU-23-2		USSR	n/a	
