= Type 56 =

Type 56 may refer to:

- Type 56 assault rifle, a Chinese 7.62×39mm assault rifle based on the AK-47
- Type 56 carbine, a Chinese carbine based on the SKS
- Type 56 squad machine gun, a Chinese light machine gun based on the RPD machine gun
- Type 56 quadruple anti-aircraft machine gun, a Chinese anti-aircraft gun based on the ZPU-4
- Type 56 mortar, a Chinese 160 mm mortar based on the M-160 mortar
- Type 56 rocket launcher, a Chinese man-portable rocket launcher based on the RPG-2
- Type 56 anti-tank gun, a Chinese field gun based on the 85 mm divisional gun D-44
- Type 56 recoilless gun, a Chinese recoilless rifle based on the M20 recoilless rifle
- Type 056 corvette, a class of corvette
- Type 56 fighter jet, an older designation for the Shenyang J-5
