= 2B11 =

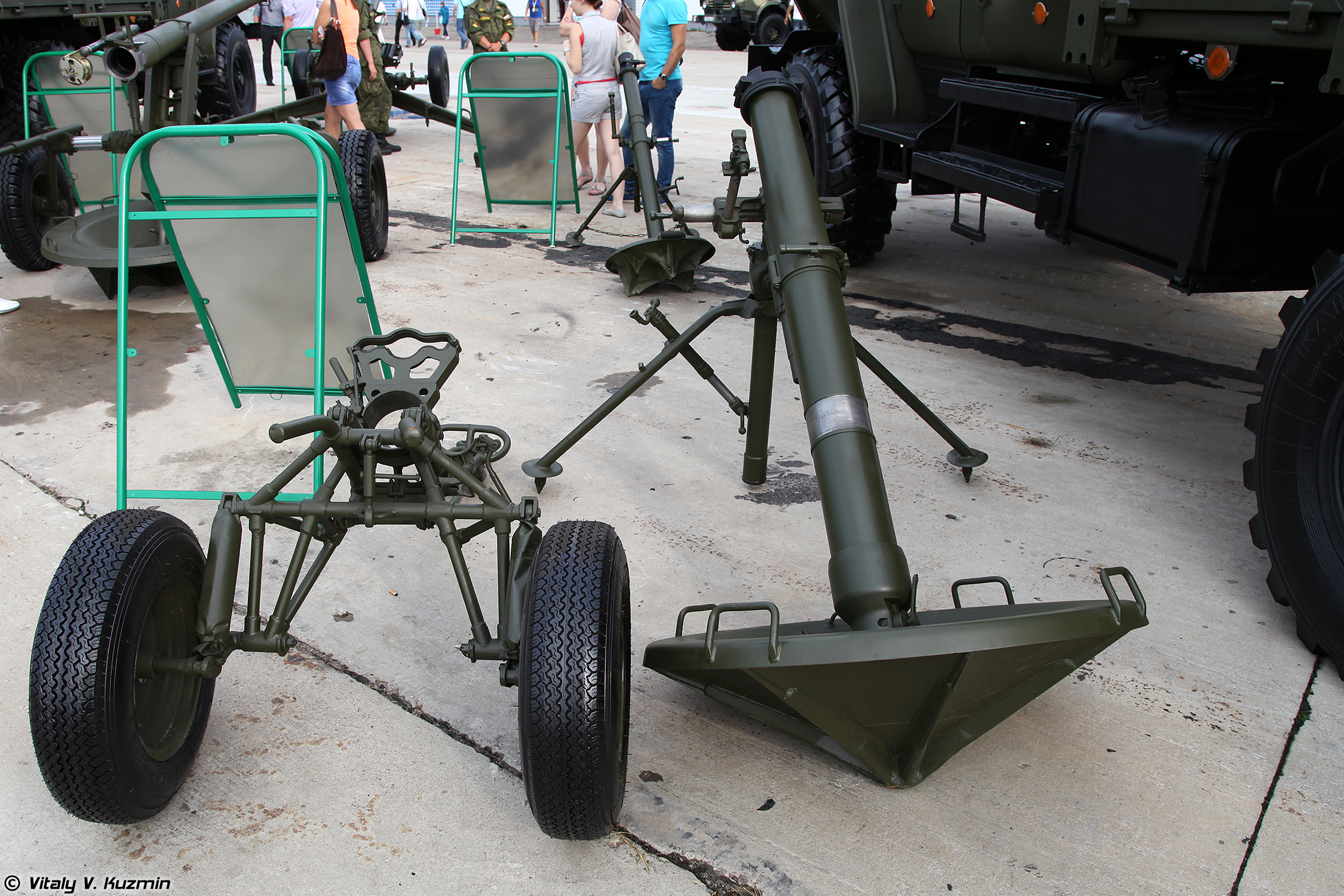
- 2B11 120mm mortar
- Type: Mortar
- Place of origin: Soviet Union

Service history
- In service: 1981–present
- Wars: Soviet–Afghan War; Russo-Ukrainian War

Production history
- Designed: 1981
- Manufacturer: Motovilikhinskiye Zavody Special Engineering and Metallurgy JSC

Specifications
- Mass: 210 kg (460 lb)
- Barrel length: 1740 mm
- Crew: 5
- Shell: HE, smoke, illuminating and incendiary
- Shell weight: 16.8 kg (37 lb)
- Caliber: 120 mm (4.7 in)
- Carriage: 2F510 2x1 wheeled transport chassis, GAZ-66 4×4 truck (prime mover)
- Elevation: 45–80°
- Traverse: ±5° (without bipod repositioning)
- Rate of fire: 15 rounds per minute
- Effective firing range: Minimum: 0.46 km (0.29 mi); Maximum: 7.18 km (4.46 mi)
- Sights: MPM-44M

The 2B11 is a 120 mm mortar developed by the Soviet Union in 1981 and subsequently fielded in the Soviet Army. The basic design for the 2B11 was taken from the classic Model 1943 120 mm mortar, and incorporated changes to make the mortar less heavy. It is a part of the 2S12 Sani. It is being supplemented in Russia by the new 2B24 82 mm mortar.

The 2B11 has proliferated to other countries primarily as result of the collapse of the Soviet Union.

== Ammunition ==
Shells specifications
Shot index	Shell index	Shell weight, kg	Mass of explosive, kg	Area of manpower destruction, m²	Area of damage to equipment, m²	Maximum firing range, km
HE/FRAG
3VOF68	3OF34	16,1	3,43	2250	1200	7,1
3VOF69	3OF36	16,1	3,16	1700	700	7,1
3VOF79	53-OF-843B	16	1,4	1200	200	7,1
Guided
KM-8 Gran		27	5,1			9
Smoke
3VD17	3D14	16,1		—	—	6,8

== Operators ==
Map with 2B11 operators in blue and former operators in red (No longer existing states diagonally striped)

=== Current operators ===
- Azerbaijan
- Belarus – 14 as part of 2S12 as of 2021
- Egypt, Equipment of the Egyptian Army#Artillery and Missile Systems
- Estonia – 66 as of 2021
- Georgia – 14 as part of 2S12 as of 2021.
- Iraq – In 2018 reported sale 24 120 mm mortars from second hand for Poland.
- Ivory Coast
- Kazakhstan – 45 as of 2021
- Kyrgyzstan – 6 as part of 2S12 as of 2021.
- Latvia
- Moldova
- Poland – 14 or 15 as of 2021
- Russia – 1730+ as of 2021
  - Ground Forces – 1700 as part of 2S12 of which 1000 are in store
  - Border Guard – Unknown number of 2S12
  - National Guard – 30 as part of 2S12
  - Luhansk PR – Unknown number
- Ukraine – 214 as of 2021
  - Ground Forces – 190 as part of 2S12
  - Air Assault Forces – 24 as part of 2S12
  - Kastuś Kalinoŭski Regiment – Unknown number, including small-scale production of replacement barrels by the regiment.
- Uzbekistan – 24 of which 19 as part of 2S12 as of 2021.
- Venezuela – 48 as part of 2S12 as of 2021.

=== Former operators ===
- East Germany
- Socialist People's Libyan Arab Jamahiriya / Libya: Libya Dawn
- Lithuania – 20 as of 2021
- Soviet Union

== Variants ==
- 2B11A – A modernized version with an improved base plate.

Some countries have developed self-propelled versions of the 2B11:

- SMM 74 B1.10 "Tundzha-Sani" – Bulgarian version on MT-LB.
- SM120 – Belarusian version on MT-LBu.
- Aybat – Kazakh version on MT-LB.

== See also ==
- Cardom 120 mm recoil mortar system
- Soltam K6 120 mm mortar
- Soltam M-65 120 mm mortar
- 120 KRH 92 120 mm mortar
- 120mm M2 raiado 120 mm mortar
- 2S12 Sani 120 mm mortar
- Mortier 120mm Rayé Tracté Modèle F1 120 mm mortar
