= 2S12 Sani =

Soviet and Russian heavy mortar

2S12 "Sani"
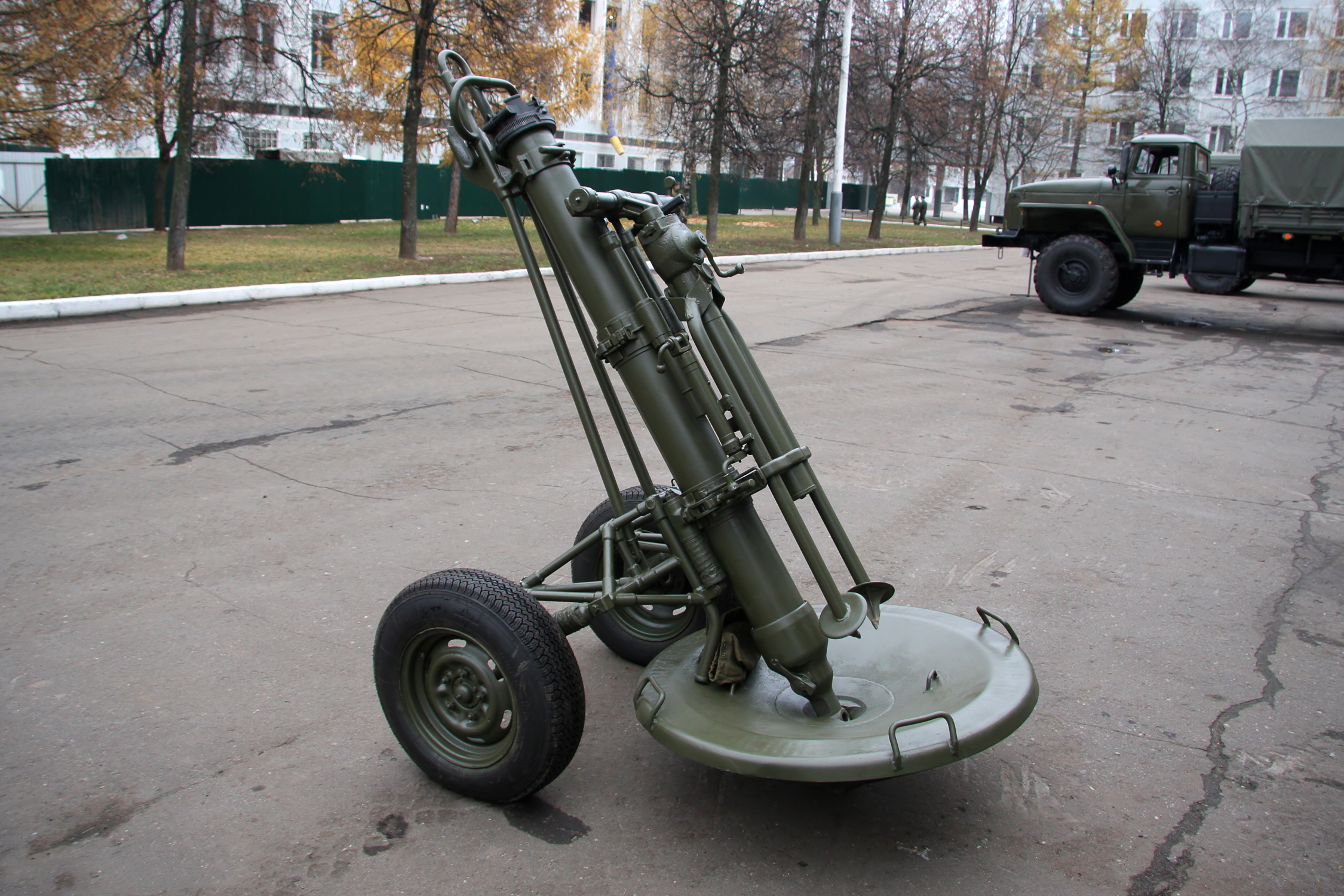
- 2S12 Sani
- Type: Heavy mortar
- Place of origin: Soviet Union / Russia

Service history
- In service: 1981–present
- Wars: Soviet–Afghan War; First Chechen War; Second Chechen War; War in Donbas

Production history
- Designed: 1981
- Manufacturer: Uraltransmash Works (Ekaterinburg, Russia); Motovilikha Plants Corporation (Perm, Russia)
- No. built: 2,000+ pieces

Specifications
- Mass: 190.5 kg (420 lb) without transport chassis
- Crew: 4 gunners, 1 commander (plus 2 prime mover crew)
- Shell: 120 mm HE mortar bombs
- Shell weight: 16 kg (35 lb)
- Carriage: 2F510 2×1 wheeled transport chassis, GAZ-66 4×4 truck (prime mover)
- Elevation: 45°–80°
- Traverse: ±5° from center
- Rate of fire: 12 rds per minute
- Effective firing range: Minimum: 0.5 km (0.31 mi); Maximum: 7.1 km (4.4 mi)
- Sights: MPM-44M graduated sight

The 2S12 "Sani" ("sleigh") (GRAU index 2S12) is a 120 mm heavy mortar system used by the Russian Army and other former Soviet states. First fielded in 1981, the 2S12 is a continued development on the towed mortars first used in World War II.

== Design ==
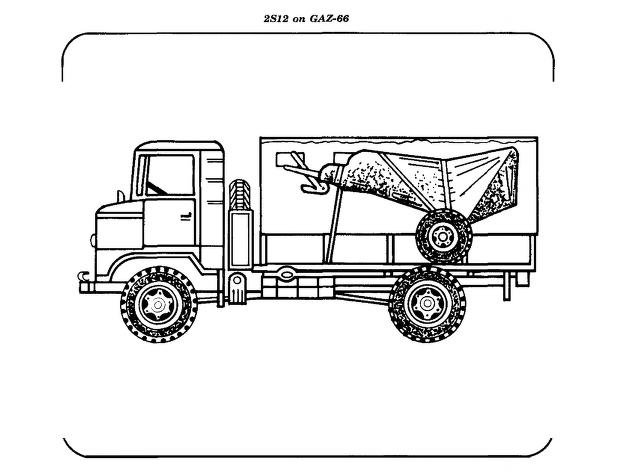
2S12 and the GAZ transport truck as described, shown in a US Army manual.

2S12 is in fact the designator for the combination of the 2B11 "Sani" heavy mortar with its transport vehicle 2F510, a GAZ-66-15 4×4 truck. The 2B11 weighs nearly 200 kg (500 lb) when fully assembled, and thus must be mounted to the 2×1 wheeled chassis 2L81 and towed to the emplacement site by the truck. The GAZ-66 prime mover also transports the ammo load: 24 32 kg (71 lb) crates of 120mm HE mortar bombs, 2 bombs per crate, for a total of 48 available rounds.

Once on site, it is unloaded from the transport chassis and manually emplaced by the crew of 5. It is the largest caliber indirect artillery employed at the battalion level.

There is also an improved model, the 2B11M, that can fire the laser-guided round "Gran" with a range of 7,500 m. 2S12A and 2S12B improved models are in service now. 2S12A got a new "Ural" family transport vehicle with high power diesel engine and electric hoist for loading the mortar and a new base plate with a hinge that allows for pointing horizontally without turning the heavy support.

== Operators ==
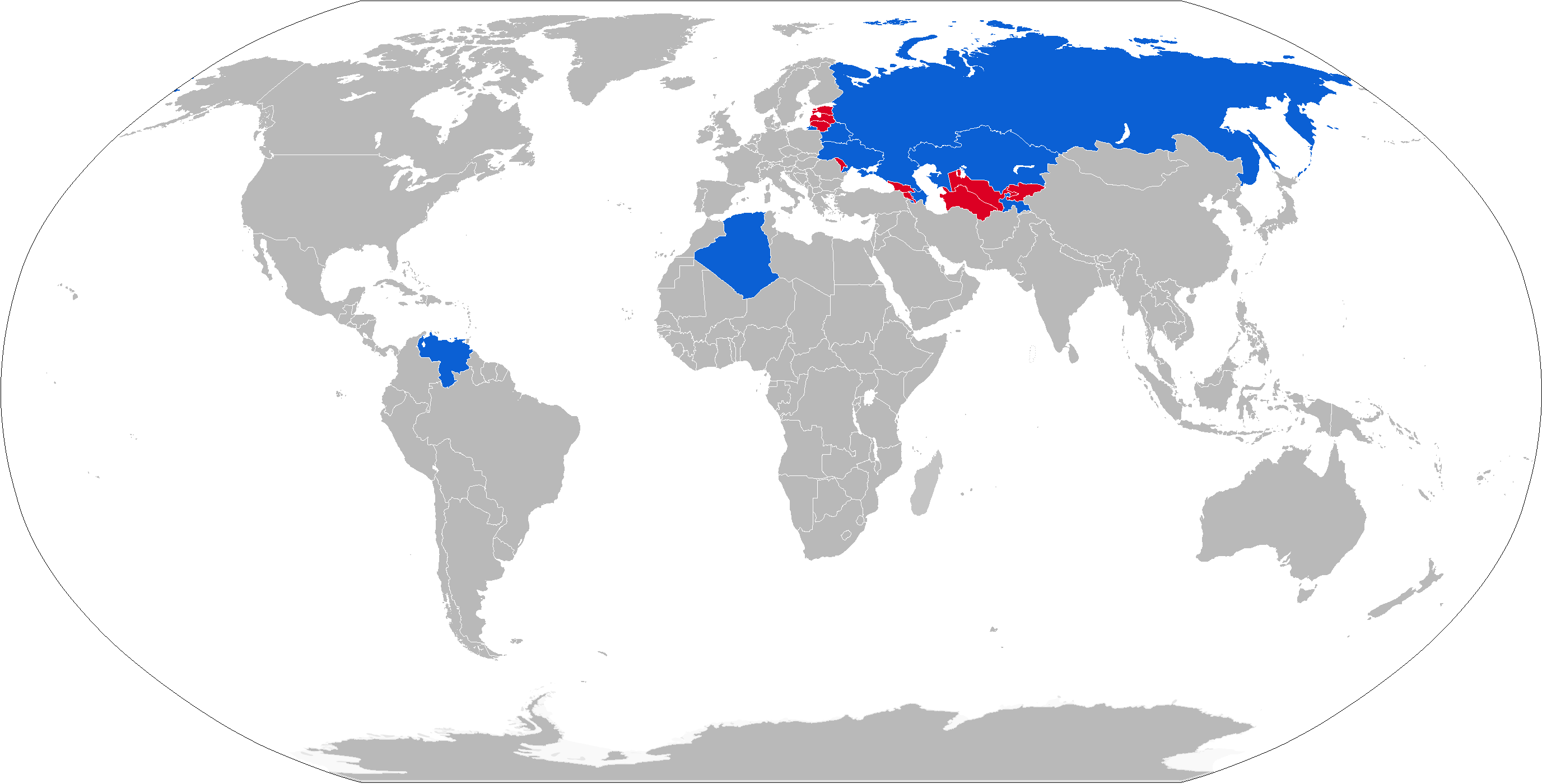
Map with 2S12 operators in blue and former operators in red

=== Current operators ===
- Algeria
- Azerbaijan
- Belarus: 61
- Bulgaria
- Georgia: 14
- Kazakhstan
- Kyrgyzstan: 6
- Russia: more than 1,700 as of 2016, including 1,000 in store. Production was reportedly doubled in 2023. More ordered in August 2023.
- Tajikistan
- Ukraine: 214
- Uzbekistan: 19
- Venezuela: 48

=== Former operators ===
- Soviet Union

== See also ==
- List of heavy mortars
- M120 120 mm mortar 120 mm mortar
- 2B11 Sani 120 mm mortar
- Cardom 120 mm recoil mortar system
- Soltam K6 120 mm mortar
- Soltam M-65 120 mm mortar
- 120 KRH 92 120 mm mortar
- 120mm M2 raiado 120 mm mortar
- Mortier 120mm Rayé Tracté Modèle F1 120 mm mortar

== Sources ==
- International Institute for Strategic Studies (February 2016). The Military Balance 2016. Vol. 116. Routlegde. ISBN 9781857438352.
