= 120 KRH 92 =

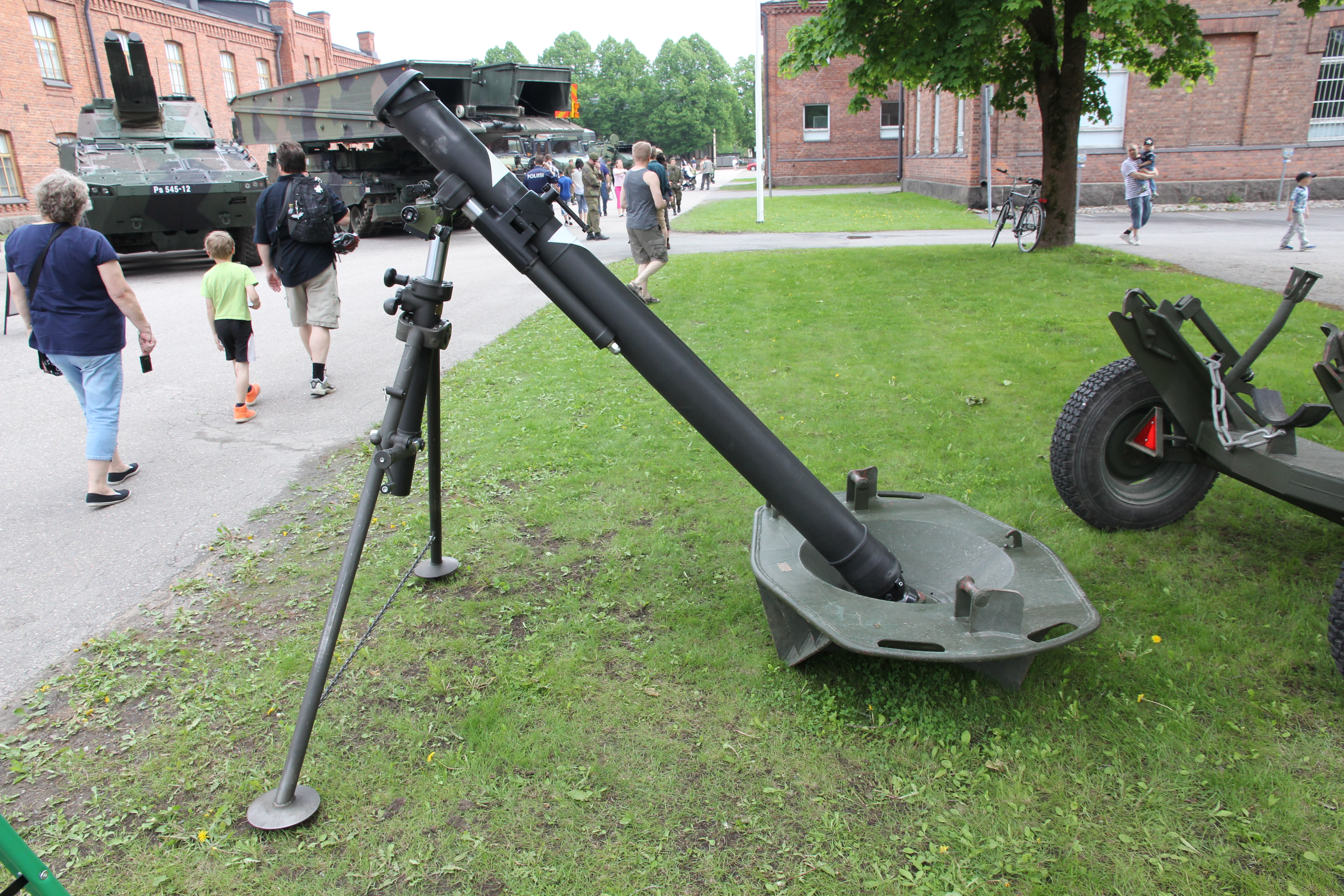
- On display during the Finnish Defence Forces 2014 Flag day
- Type: Heavy mortar
- Place of origin: Finland

Service history
- Used by: See operators
- Wars: Russo-Ukrainian War

Production history
- Manufacturer: Patria Vammas Oy

Specifications
- Mass: 159 kg (351 lb) (combat); 342 kg (754 lb) (transport)
- Length: 1.74 m (5 ft 9 in)
- Barrel length: 1.6 m (5 ft 3 in)
- Shell: High-explosive fragmentation, smoke, illumination, practice
- Caliber: 120 mm (4.7 in)
- Elevation: 45−80°
- Traverse: 4.2° right and left (on bipod at 60°); 360° (by moving bipod)
- Rate of fire: 15 rounds per minute
- Maximum firing range: 7,300 m (24,000 ft)

The 120 KRH 92 (Finnish: 120 mm kranaatinheitin, malli 1992) is a 120 mm mortar manufactured in Finland.

== Design ==
The KRH 92 is a conventional 120 mm (4.7 in) smoothbore mortar, with a high tensile-strength steel alloy barrel and baseplate. The KHR 92 is a sturdy weapon and stable in all kinds of terrain. It is designed for quick employment and redeployment: it takes less than a minute to emplace the mortar. The baseplate provides a full 360° traverse without the need of moving it.

Two versions of the KRH 92 were developed: a long-range version capable of firing a mortar bomb (either by simply dropping it inside the barrel or pulling the trigger) at a distance of 8,600 m (28,200 ft) and lighter version with a shorter barrel with a range of 7,300 m (24,000 ft).

The light version, which is the standard 120 mm mortar of the Finnish Army has a shorter barrel, a modified carriage, the bipod is made of high-strength aluminum instead of steel, and the firing mechanism is simplified, being capable of drop firing only. But the firing pin can be retracted by pulling a lever to clear misfires or interrupt firing.

The KRH 92 can be mounted and fired (at a 54° angle) from the trailer unit of a Patria tracked articulated vehicle.

The mortar has seen use during the Russo-Ukrainian War with Ukrainian forces. For security reasons, Finland has not officially disclosed the quantity or exact types of equipment supplied to Ukraine.

== Operators ==
- Finland − 698 as of 2025
- Ukraine

== See also ==
- List of heavy mortars
- M120 120 mm mortar 120 mm mortar
- 2B11 Sani 120 mm mortar
- 2S12 Sani 120 mm mortar
- Cardom 120 mm recoil mortar system
- Soltam K6 120 mm mortar
- Soltam M-65 120 mm mortar
- 120mm M2 raiado 120 mm mortar
- Mortier 120mm Rayé Tracté Modèle F1 120 mm mortar
