= 160 mm mortar M1943 =

Soviet heavy mortar

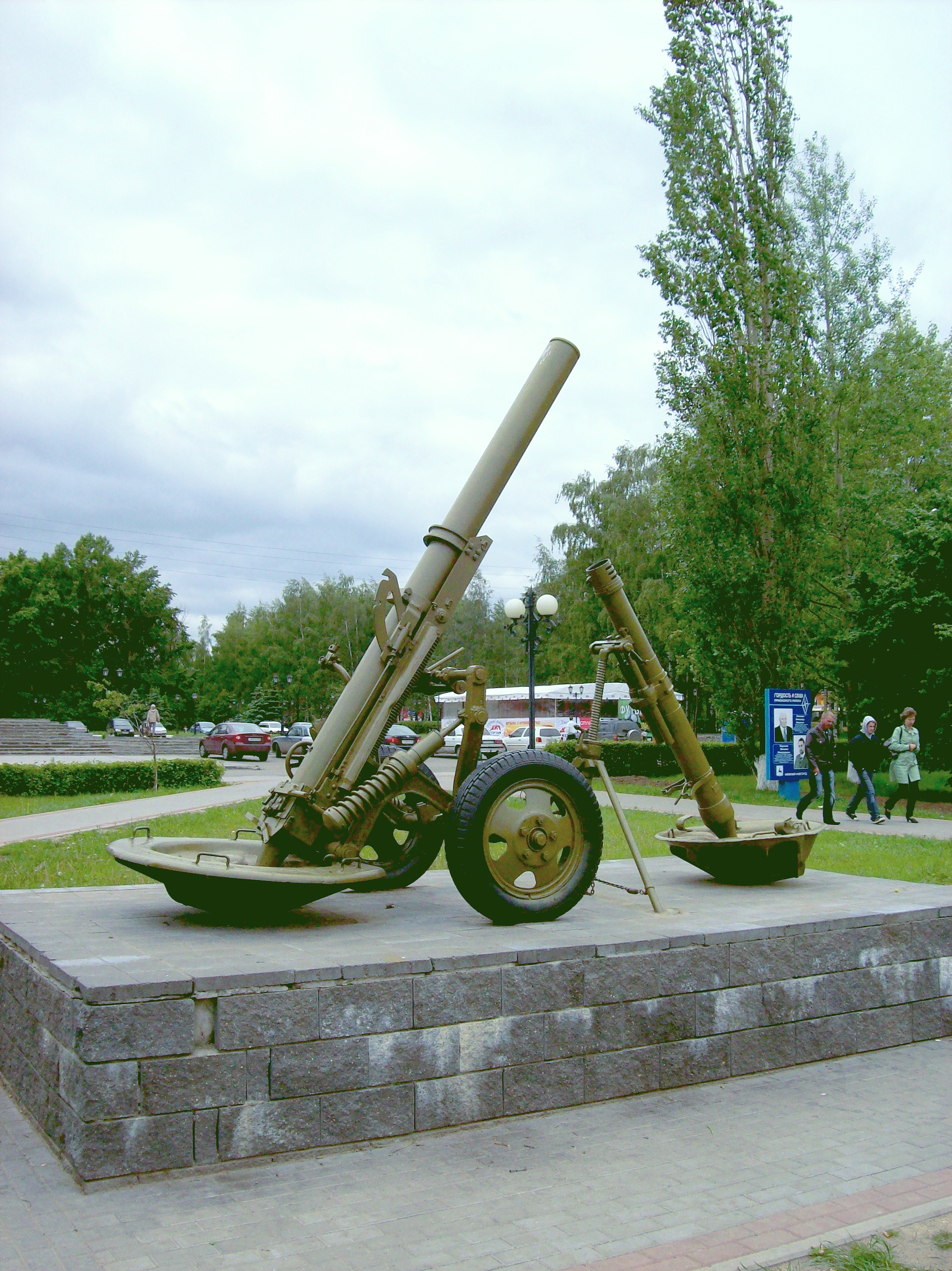
- The 160 mm mortar M1943 at Memorial Complex in Nizhny Novgorod
- Type: Heavy mortar
- Place of origin: Soviet Union

Service history
- In service: 1943–present
- Wars: World War II; Korean War; Six-Day War; Vietnam War; Yom Kippur War; Lebanese Civil War; 1978 South Lebanon conflict South Lebanon conflict (1985–2000)

Specifications
- Mass: 1,170 kg (2,580 lb)
- Barrel length: 3.03 m (9.9 ft)
- Shell: 40.8 kg (90 lb) bomb
- Caliber: 160 mm (6.3 in)
- Elevation: +45° to +80°
- Traverse: 25°
- Rate of fire: 3 rounds/minute
- Muzzle velocity: 245 m/s (800 ft/s)
- Effective firing range: 5,150 m (16,900 ft)

The Soviet 160 mm mortar M1943 is a smoothbore breech loading heavy mortar that fired a 160 mm (6.3 in) bomb. The M1943 (also called the MT-13) was one of the heaviest mortar used by Soviet troops in World War II. Around 535 of these weapons were fielded with Soviet forces during the war. It was replaced in Soviet service after World War II by the M-160 mortar of the same caliber.

== Description ==
Originally a simple scaling-up of the 120 mm (4.7 in) M1938 mortar, it soon became apparent that drop-loading a 40.8 kg (90 lb) bomb into a 3.03 m (9.9 ft) long tube would be too difficult for any man to do. It was redesigned into a breech loading weapon, and contains a substantial recoil system to soak up the massive shock of firing a 160 mm (6.3 in) bomb and prevent the baseplate from burying itself too deeply.

The barrel sits in a cradle, which is attached to a baseplate and tripod. To load the weapon, the barrel is hinged forward, which exposes the rear end of the tube. The bomb is then loaded, retained in place by a catch, and the barrel is swung back into the cradle, which in effect closes the breech.

Because of the mortar's heavy weight, it is equipped with a wheeled carriage and is designed to be towed by a motor-driven vehicle.

== Service ==
=== Users ===
- Algeria: 60 as of 2016
- Egypt: 30 as of 2016
- Guinea
- Hezbollah
- North Korea
- Vietnam

=== Former users ===
- Afghanistan
- Albania
- Bulgaria
- Cambodia
- China
- Cuba
- Czechoslovakia
- Czech Republic
- Finland
- India
- Iraq
- Libya
- Poland
- Romania
- Slovakia
- Soviet Union
- Syria
- Yemen
