= RS9 Vampir =

Bosnian designed pistol

- Type: Semi-automatic pistol
- Place of origin: Bosnia and Herzegovina

Production history
- Manufacturer: Tehnički remont Bratunac

Specifications
- Mass: 820g (without magazine); 920g (with empty magazine); 1100g (with fully loaded magazine)
- Length: 190.5 mm
- Barrel length: 108 mm
- Width: 39.5 mm
- Height: 138.2 mm
- Cartridge: 9×19mm Parabellum
- Effective firing range: 50 m
- Maximum firing range: 150 m
- Feed system: 18-round box magazine

The RS9 Vampir is a semi-automatic pistol produced by Tehnički remont Bratunac in Bosnia and Herzegovina. It is the first pistol produced by TRB. On its receiver it has a picatinny rail for possible installation of tactical lamps and other accessories, located in front of the trigger.
