= Egyptian Integrated Soldier System =

- Type: Future soldier program
- Place of origin: Egypt

Service history
- Used by: See Users below

Production history
- Designer: AIO
- Manufacturer: AIO

The Egyptian Integrated Soldier System (EISS) is an integrated surveillance and aiming ensemble that provides images from different electro/optical devices to a head-mounted display (HMD), and links these optics to either the daylight scope of an RPG-7 or a targeting dot sight on a machine gun or assault rifle. The Cairo-based AIO company, founded in 1984 and belonging to the Egypt Ministry of Defence, is currently providing the Egyptian military with the EISS (Egyptian Integrated Soldier System).

== Components ==
The Egyptian Integrated Soldier System consists of surveillance, aiming and control equipment. The system achieves the flexibility of use and lightness of weight as much as possible. It also achieves the highest degree of accuracy and durability in accordance with the standard global military specification.

Helmet group consists of:

• thermal observation sight.

• display screen is mounted in front of the soldier's eye.

Set of power supply and control:

• rechargeable batteries.

• control switch unit.

• battery level indicators.

Set of clothes and accessories:

• Tactical composite material helmet.

• military combat camouflaged protective vest.

• camouflaged back mounted bag.

• mounted 2.3-liter rehydration pouch.

• protective knee and elbow pads.

• back strap.

• antibacterial socks.

• antibacterial leather gloves.

• antibacterial desert boots.

Weapon group consists of:

• Thermal aiming sight.

The EISS aims mostly at increasing vision and aiming capabilities of soldiers and commanders, thus their lethality. Two versions of the system are available, the Commander one and the Soldier one, many elements being the same.

The Commander version is made of five elements, helmet system, weapon system, control and power, cables, and clothing kit. The helmet system sees an uncooled thermal camera fitted on the right of the helmet, the soldier seeing the generated image in its helmet mounted display.

A thermal aiming sight is fitted to the assault rifle, which is linked to the control and power box, carried at the belt. Currently the control and power system is contained into a metal parallelepiped box, which is not a very ergonomic solution, but a more conformal system might be developed following trials. Rechargeable batteries are located in the box, which can be easily reloaded using a battery charger; batteries ensure up to 10 hours of power to the system. All EISS subsystems are connected via cable. The clothing is quite standard and includes the composite helmet as well as the combat suit and protections, a 2.3 litres hydration system being also part of the package. Overall, the Commander EISS has a weight of 1.5 kg.

The Soldier EISS is slightly heavier, around 2 kg, as the sensors on the helmet become two, one TV-based day optical system, with a x2 magnification, and a third-generation image intensification device with x1 magnification. Images are once again shown onto the HMD in front of the soldier’s eye. In daytime, aiming is done using a visible red dot pointer, while at night this will be IR. As for weapons sights, II sights are being installed, a x3 on the RPG, a x4 on the AKM and a x6 for the general-purpose machine gun.

== Users ==
Egypt: Currently, it is unclear how many Egyptian units will receive the final EISS product. The Egyptian Army maintains eight special forces regiments, known as “El-Sa’ka Forces” (translated to Thunderbolt Forces), comprising 24 battalions. It is possible that the initial fielding will be limited some of the country’s more secretive high-speed outfits, such as Units 777 and 999, which function in a similar role to the British SAS or the US Army’s Delta Force.
