= BK-3 helmet =

Croatian made combat-helmet used by Lithuania, Croatia and Egypt

The BK-3 is a Croatian Combat helmet produced by Šestan-Busch, and is the standard combat helmet of the Croatian Armed Forces. It is also widely exported to many NATO and Middle Eastern customers.

The BK-3 replaced the Šestan-Busch BK-9, which was the first Croatian version of the Gefechtshelm M92, except it used the original U.S. PASGT suspension head system.

== Design ==
The BK-3 is made from Aramid fibre, with antiballistic protection level IIIA according to NIJ 0106.01 and antiballistic protection v50≥ 650 m/s according to STANAG 2920. The helmet was formerly made of Kevlar. The shape of the helmet is very similar to the Gefechtshelm M92 helmet of the Bundeswehr, which itself is derived from the U.S. PASGT helmet. As with the German M92, the BK-3 comes with a three-point chin strap.

Šestan-Busch have patents on their "boltless technology" construction of their helmets and on their "SHOTECK inside equipment" head protection systems. The latest issue variant has integrated side rails for lights and front NVG mount.

== Users ==
- Croatia: Armed Forces of Croatia
- Egypt: Widely used by Egyptian Special Forces, Republican Guard and infantry units.
- Lithuania: Lithuanian Land Force
- Turkey: Turkish Land Forces

== Gallery ==
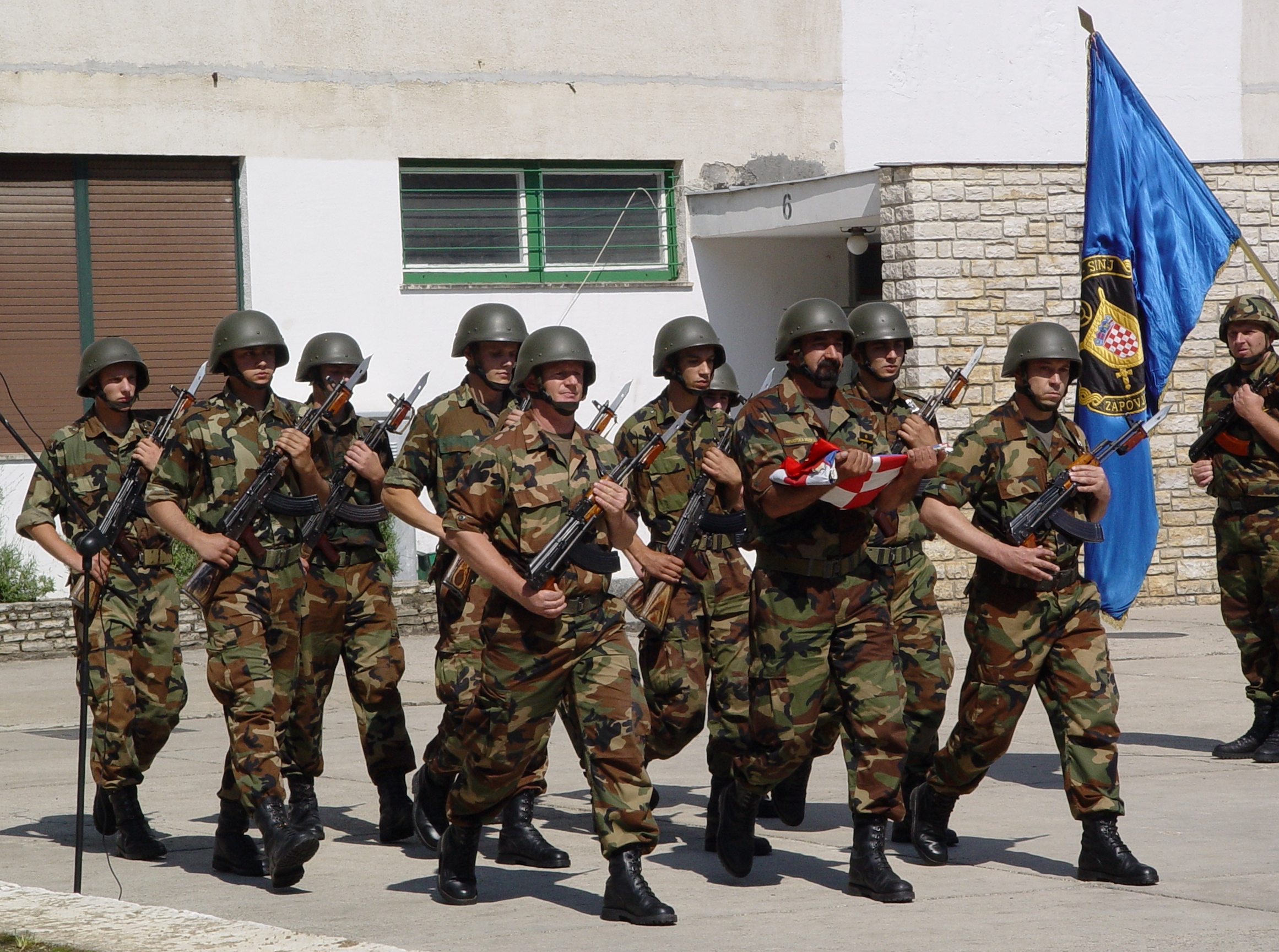
Croatian soldiers wearing BK-3 helmets.

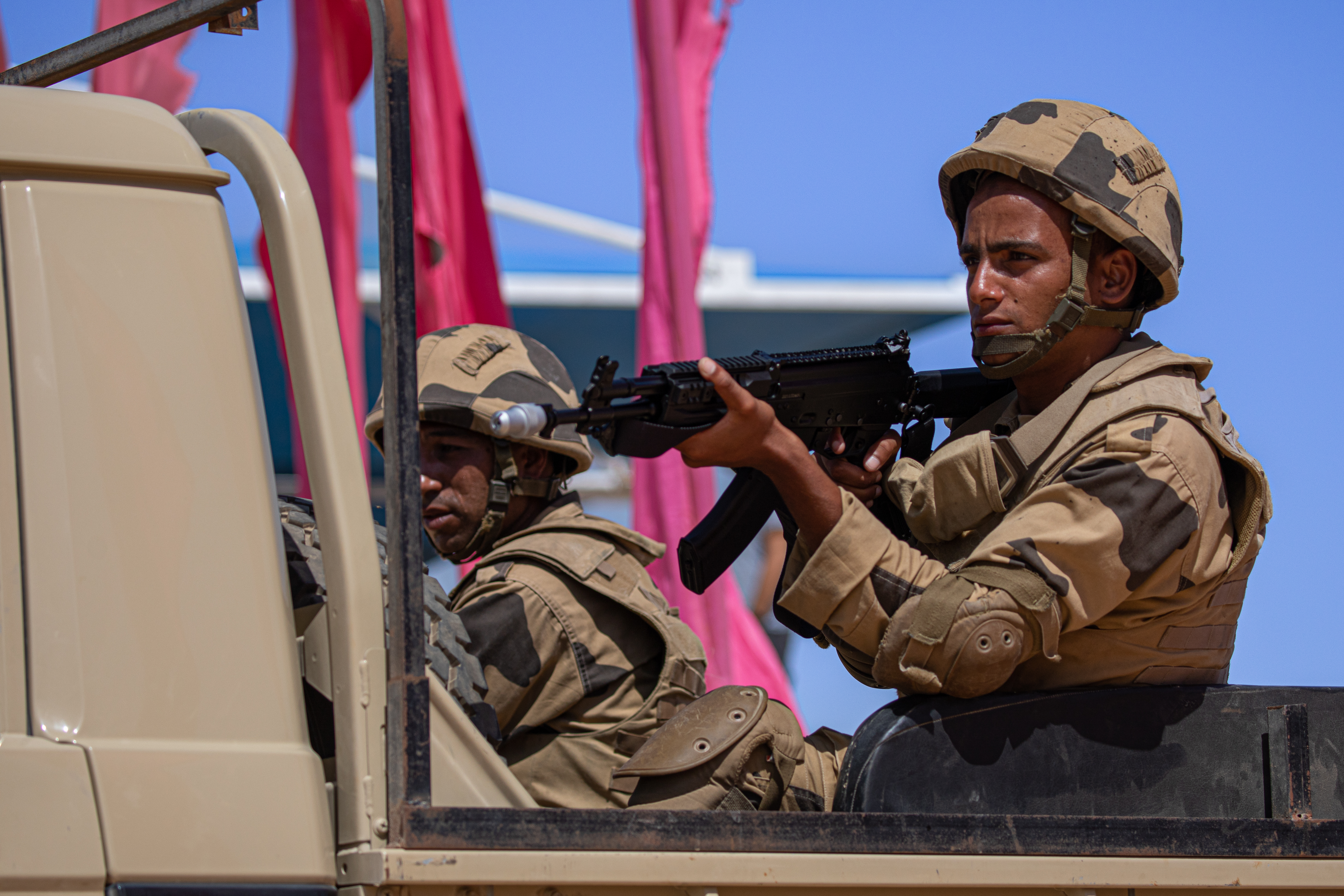
Egyptian Saiqa commando wears BK-3 helmet.
