= 120-PM-43 mortar =

M1943 Mortar
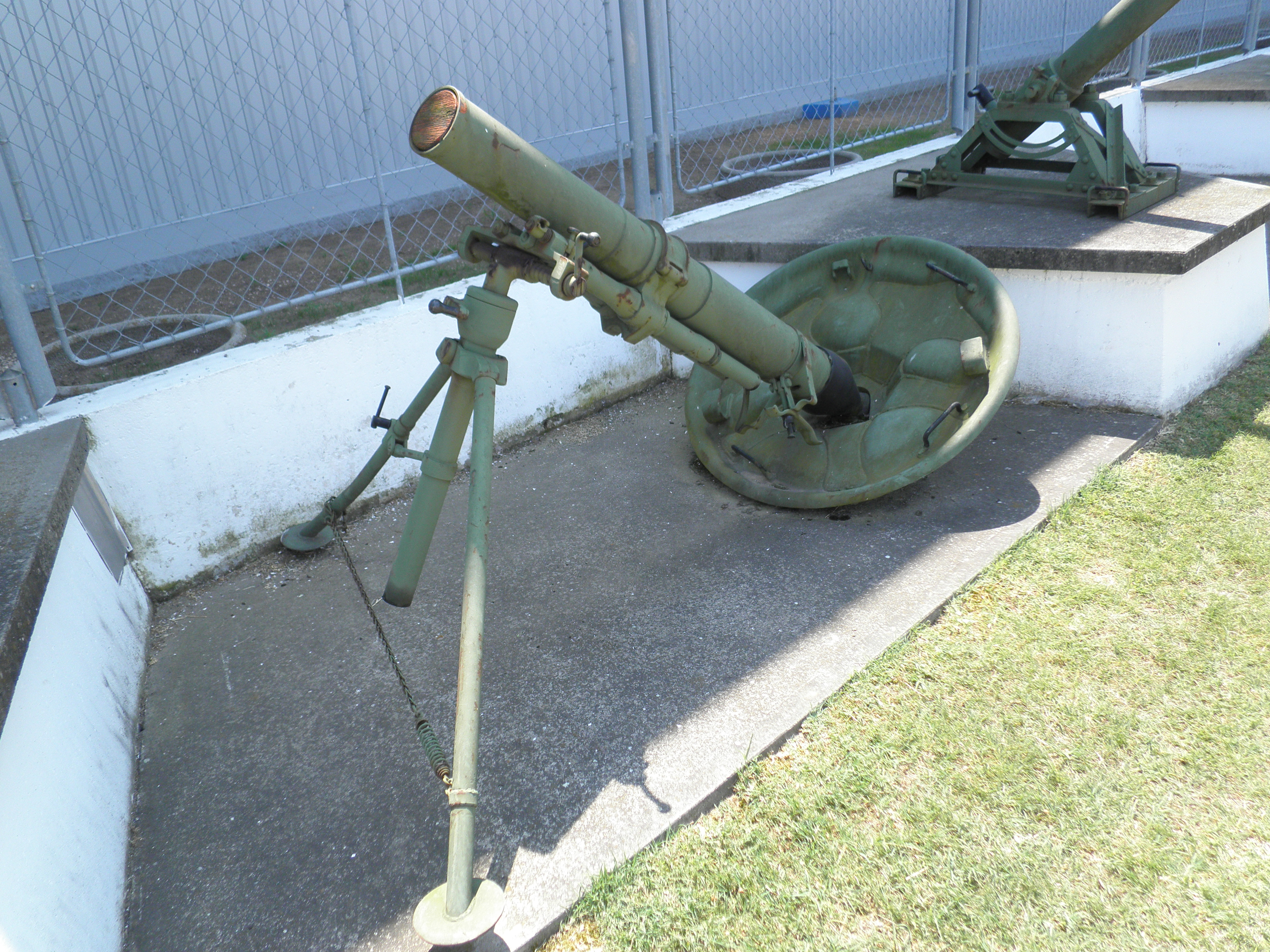
- 120mm PM-43 mortar
- Type: Mortar
- Place of origin: Soviet Union

Service history
- In service: 1943-present
- Used by: Soviet Union
- Wars: Eastern Front (World War II); Korean War; Vietnam War; Cambodian Civil War; Rhodesian Bush War; Portuguese Colonial War; Lebanese Civil War; Soviet–Afghan War; Gulf War; South Sudanese Civil War

Production history
- Manufacturer: Uralmash

Specifications
- Mass: 275 kg (606 lb)
- Crew: 6
- Caliber: 120 mm (4.7 in)
- Breech: muzzle loaded
- Elevation: +45° to +80°
- Rate of fire: 9 rpm maximum, 70 rds/hr sustained
- Muzzle velocity: 272 m/s (890 ft/s) Frag-HE & HE
- Effective firing range: 5,700 m (6,200 yd) maximum, 500 m (550 yd) minimum

The M1943 Mortar or 120-PM-43 (Russian: 120-Полковой Миномёт-43) or the 120-mm mortar Model 1943 (Russian: 120-мм миномет обр. 1943 г.), also known as the SAMOVAR, is a Soviet 120 millimeter calibre smoothbore mortar first introduced in 1943 as a modified version of the M1938 mortar. It virtually replaced the M1938 as the standard weapon for mortar batteries in all Soviet infantry battalions by the late 1980s, though the armies of the Warsaw Pact utilised both in their forces.

== Ammunition ==
Shells specifications
Shot index	Shell index	Shell weight, kg	Mass of explosive, kg	Area of manpower destruction, m²	Area of damage to equipment, m²	Maximum firing range, km
HE
53-VF-843	53-F-843	16,2	3,93			4,1
HE/FRAG
53-VOF-843	53-OF-843	15,9	3,0			5,7
53-VOF-843А	53-OF-843A	15,9	1,58			5,52
53-VOF-843B	53-OF-843B	16	1,4	1200	200	5,7
3VOF3	3OF5	15,6	1,25			5,35
3VOF53	3OF34	16,1	3,43	2250	1200	5,7
3VOF57	3OF36	16,1	3,16	1700	700	5,7
Incendiary
53-VZ-843A	53-Z-843A	17	1,359	—	—	5,47
3VЗ4	3-Z-2	16,3	1,94	—	—	5,7
Smoke
53-VD-843A	53-D-843A	16,44	1,6	—	—	5,5
3VD5	3D5	16,6	1,65	—	—	5,8
3VD16	3D14	16,1		—	—	5,4
Illumination
53-VS-843	53-S-843	16,28	0,875	—	—	5,4
3VS24	3S9	16,28	1,28	—	—	5,4

== Design ==
This muzzle-loading mortar can be easily broken down into three parts – barrel, bipod and baseplate – for movement over short distances or towed by a GAZ-66 truck on a two-wheel tubular carriage. The baseplate mounting permits all-azimuth firing; however, as with most Soviet mortars, it was difficult to turn rapidly over a wide traverse. It could accommodate small-angle shifts of up to 6 degrees without having to shift the baseplate though.

== Variants ==
It was copied in China as the Type 53 mortar. A more robust but heavier version, the Type 55, was developed by Norinco. Egypt also produced a locally modified variant, the Helwan Model UK 2. An improved version called the 2B11 Sani was also produced by the Soviets and, in combination with the 2B9 Vasilek, was being used to phase out the M1943 from service.

== Users ==
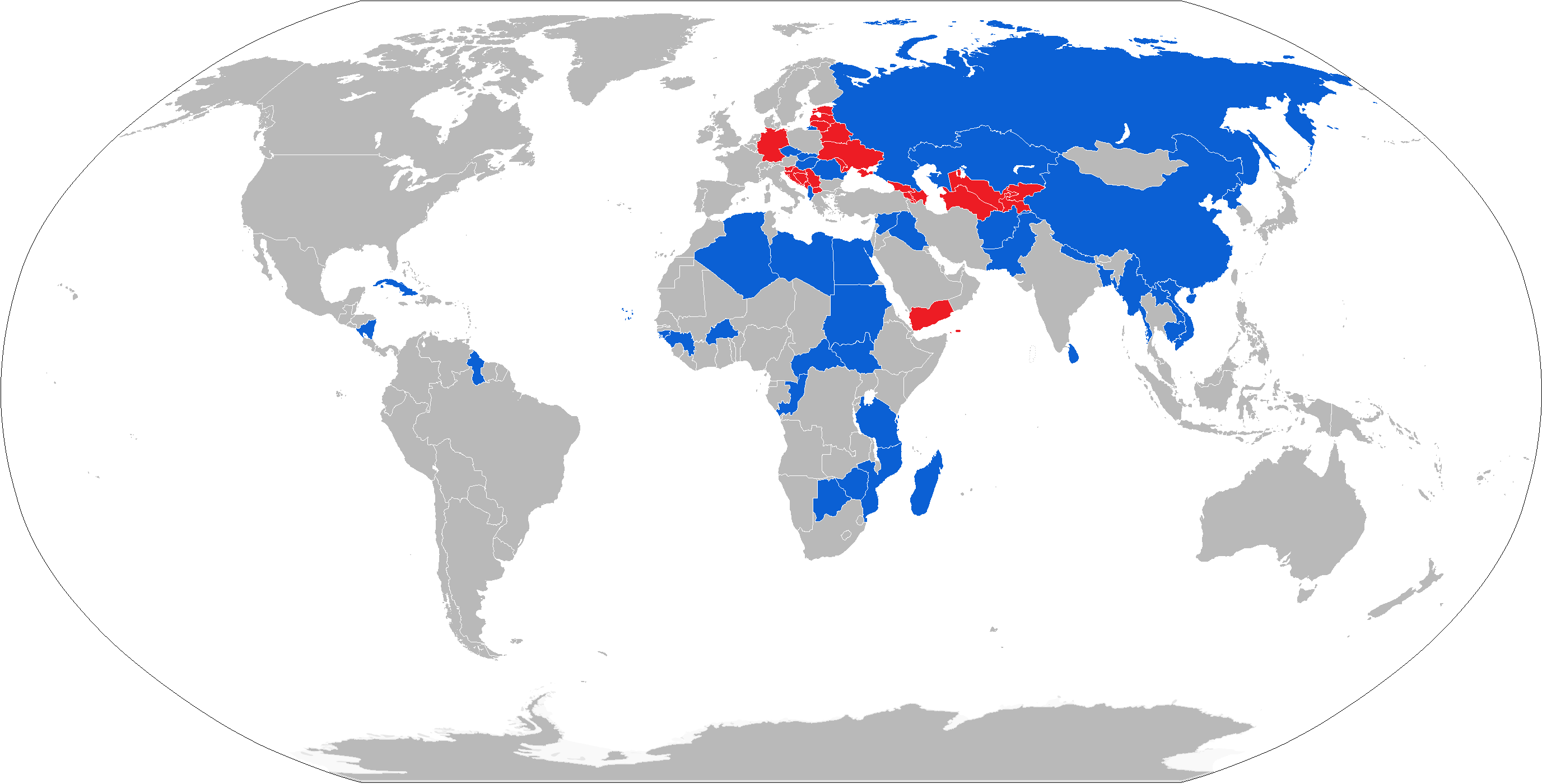
A map with nations that use the 120-PM-43 mortar in blue

- Afghanistan
- Albania
- Algeria
- Bangladesh: Type 53 variant
- Botswana: 6
- Burkina Faso: 12
- Cambodia
- Cape Verde: 6
- Central African Republic: 12 in store
- China: Manufactured as Type 53 and Type 55
- Republic of the Congo: 28
- Cuba
- Czech Republic
- Egypt: PM-43 and Helwan Model UK 2
- Guinea
- Guinea-Bissau: 8
- Guyana: 18
- Hungary: 1 as of 2016
- Iraq
- Kazakhstan
- North Korea
- Laos
- Libya
- Madagascar: 8
- Mozambique: 12
- Myanmar: Type 53 variant
- Nepal
- Nicaragua: 24
- Pakistan: Type 53 variant
- Romania
- Russia
- Slovakia
- South Sudan: Type 55
- Sudan
- Sri Lanka
- Syria
- Tanzania: Type 53 variant
- Vietnam: PM-43, Type 53 and Type 55
- Zimbabwe: 6

=== Former users ===
- East Germany
- Liberation Tigers of Tamil Eelam
- South Yemen
- Soviet Union
- Federal Republic of Yugoslavia
