= M-160 mortar =

Soviet mortar

160 mm mortar M-160
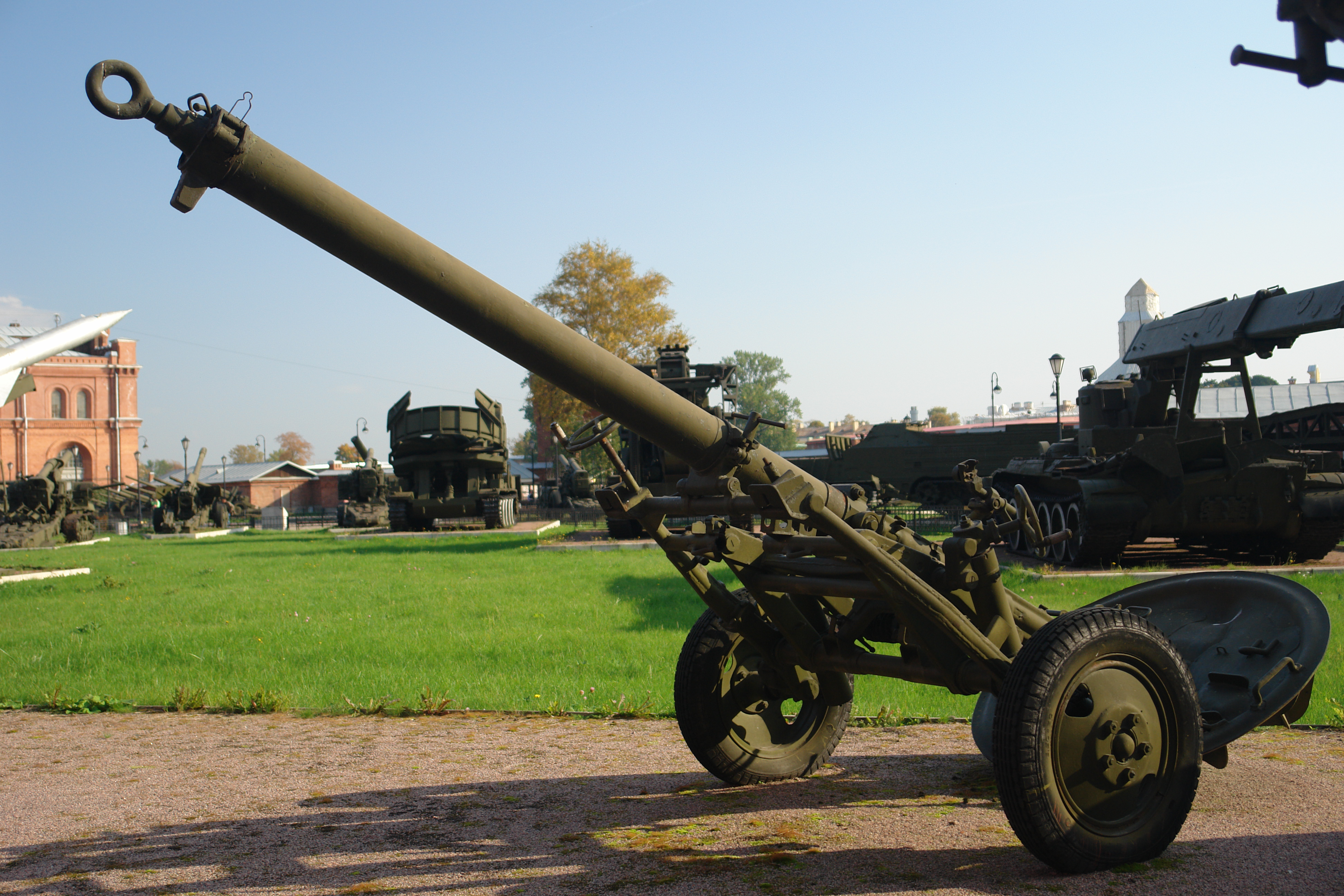
- Type: Mortar
- Place of origin: Soviet Union

Service history
- In service: 1953–present
- Wars: Arab–Israeli conflict; Vietnam War; Indo-Pakistani War of 1971; Iran–Iraq War; Syrian civil war

Production history
- Manufacturer: Tula Plant No. 535 (now Tulamashzavod); V111, V113 and V125 Plant (Vietnam)
- Produced: 1949–1957 (USSR); 1974 (Vietnam, with support from USSR)
- No. built: 2,353 (USSR); 100 (Vietnam)
- Variants: See variants

Specifications
- Mass: 1,470 kilograms (3,240 lb)
- Barrel length: 4.55 metres (14.9 ft)
- Crew: 7
- Shell: 41.5 kilograms (91 lb) bomb
- Caliber: 160 millimetres (6.3 in)
- Elevation: +50° to +80°
- Traverse: 24°
- Rate of fire: 2–3 rounds/minute
- Muzzle velocity: 343 metres per second (1,130 ft/s)
- Effective firing range: 8,040 metres (8,790 yd)

The Soviet 160 mm Mortar M-160 is a smoothbore breech loading heavy mortar which fired a 160 mm shell. It replaced the 160mm Mortar M1943 in Soviet service after World War II.

== Description ==
It is very similar to the M1943 mortar but has a longer barrel, thus enabling a greater range. To load the mortar, the breech is released from the baseplate and swung into a horizontal position; after the round is loaded, the breech is returned to its original position. It is mounted on a wheeled carriage so that it can be towed by trucks such as the GAZ-66. China copied it as the Type 56 mortar.

The M-160 has a minimum range of 750 m (820 yd) and a maximum range of 8,040 m (8,790 yd).

According to the combat doctrine of the Vietnamese People's Army, the 160mm mortar was developed to destroy the enemy's fortified bunkers and trenches, and can also be used to ambush military bases. The mortar can be deployed in all terrains such as hills, mountains, plains, and urban areas. It is most effective when deployed in elevated terrain and urban areas where the target is often hidden behind defensive cover.

== Service ==
It was introduced in 1953. Originally deployed as a standard mortar for all types of division, it is now used particularly as mountain or urban artillery. Some countries still use it as field artillery. China originally deployed 12 Type 56 mortars per field division. The M-160 saw service during the Arab–Israeli conflict, including the Lebanese Civil War; with the Indian Army during the Indo-Pakistani War of 1971; and with the North Vietnamese Army in the 1975 spring offensive during the Vietnam War.

== Variants ==
- M-160 − Soviet divisional mortar.
- Type 56 − Chinese copy of the M-160.
- T-54 with 160 mm mortar − An Iraqi modification of the T-54/T-55 tank, (Note: Some conversions were done on the Chinese Type 59 or Type 69 tank chassis instead.) with the turret removed and replaced with a fixed superstructure with an enclosed M-160 mortar with limited traverse. Access doors were provided on the sides and rear of the superstructure and when travelling the mortar was left in horizontal position. It never entered Iraqi Army service in significant numbers.

== Users ==
=== Current ===
- Russia − 150 as of 2024
- Cambodia
- Egypt − 30 as of 2024
- Syria

=== Former ===
- China − Produced locally as the Type 56
- India
- Iraq
- Nicaragua − 4 in storage as of 2024
- Poland
- Romania
