= 120mm M2 raiado =

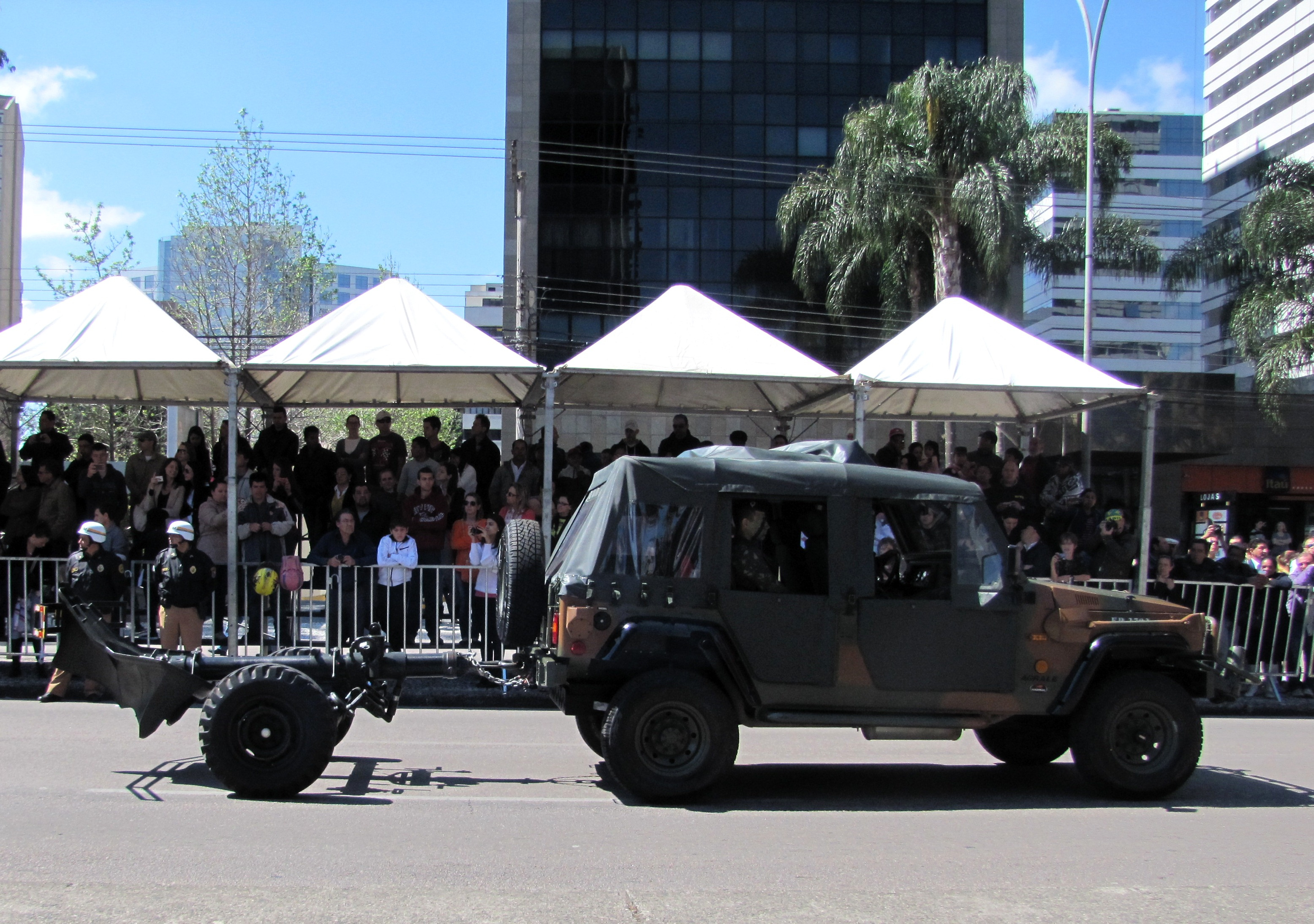
- Type: Heavy Mortar
- Place of origin: Brazil

Service history
- Used by: Brazilian Army

Production history
- Designer: War Arsenal of Rio de Janeiro
- Manufacturer: AGRJ - War Arsenal of Rio de Janeiro - Arsenal D. John VI

Specifications
- Mass: 717 kg (1,581 lb)
- Length: 3.060 m (10.04 ft)
- Shell: HE
- Caliber: 120 mm (4.7 in)
- Traverse: 360°
- Rate of fire: 18 rounds/min
- Effective firing range: 6.5 km (6,500 m) standard or 13 km (13,000 m) with additional propulsion

The 120mm M2 Rifled Heavy Mortar (Portuguese: Morteiro Pesado 120mm M2 raiado) is a Brazilian 120 mm mortar designed to have great firepower, mobility, and flexibility. The RT-M2 is designed by the War Arsenal of Rio de Janeiro for the Brazilian Army artillery. The RT-M2 can be transported by ground or air, and can also be air dropped, and offers a 360° range without the necessity of re-positioning the base. The RT-M2 can use any 120 mm ammunition built to international standards.

== Characteristics ==
- Official name: Mrt P 120 M2 R (120 M2 heavy mortar)
- Manufacturer: AGRJ - War Arsenal of Rio de Janeiro - Arsenal D. John VI
- Caliber: 120 mm
- Length: 3.060 m
- Total Weight: 717 kg
- Range: 6,5 km standard projectile or 13 km additional propulsion
- Rate of fire: 18 rounds / min
- Use: Command or Automatic

Ammunition:

- Conventional: High explosive
- Signaling
- Exercise
- Illuminative
- Smoke
